= Lukovdol =

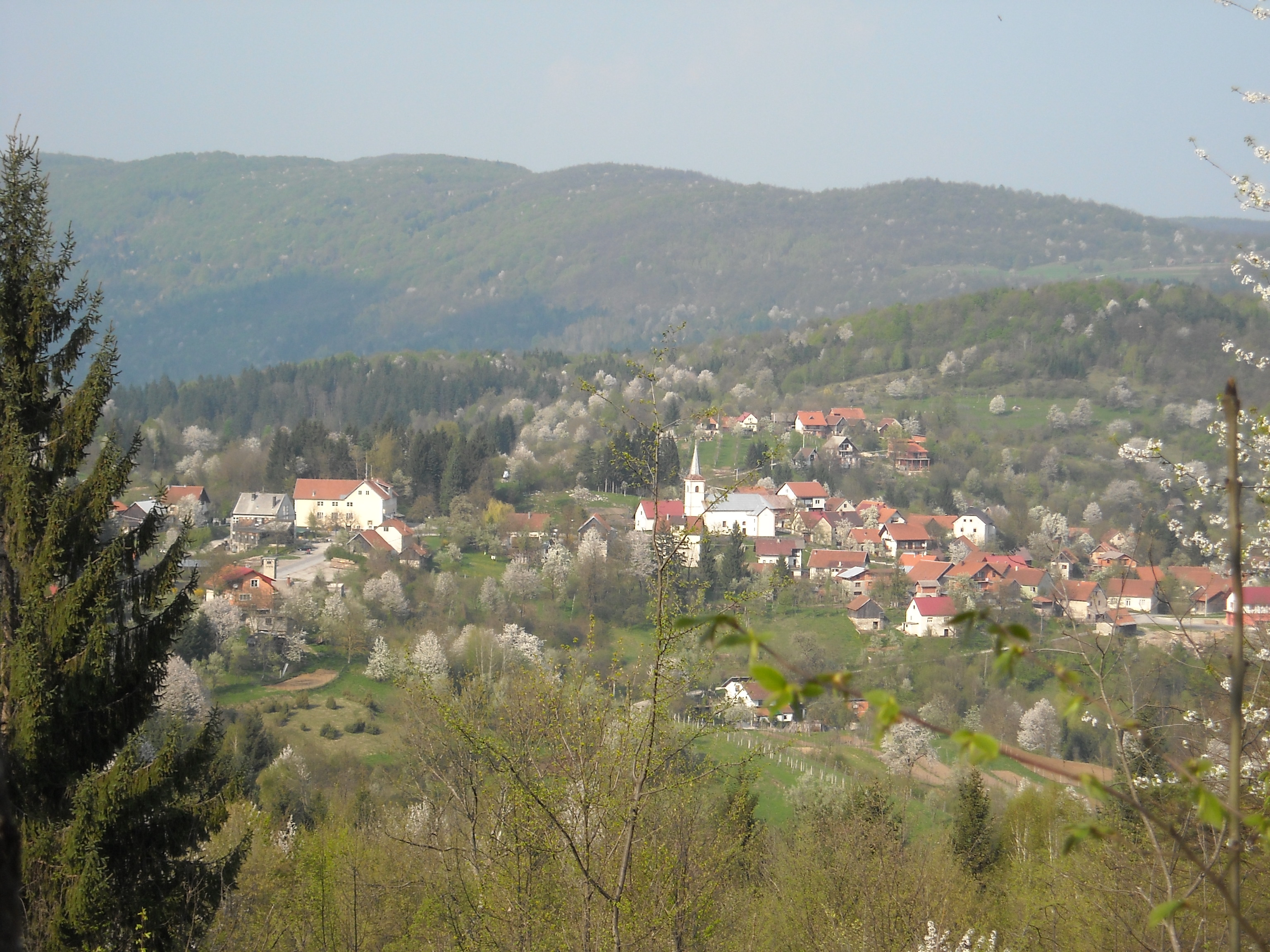
- Interactive map of Lukovdol
- Location within Croatia
- Coordinates: 45°26′N 15°08′E
- Country: Croatia
- County: Primorje-Gorski Kotar
- City: Vrbovsko

Area
  - Total: 6.2 km^{2} (2.4 sq mi)
- Elevation: 337 m (1,106 ft)

Population (2021)
  - Total: 104
  - Density: 17/km^{2} (43/sq mi)
- Time zone: UTC+1 (CET)
  - Summer (DST): UTC+2 (CEST)

Lukovdol is a small village located in the Gorski Kotar region of Croatia, about one mile south of the Slovenian border. Lukovdol is part of Vrbovsko municipality. Local industries include cattle raising, lumber processing, and textile products.

Lukovdol is the birthplace of Ivan Goran Kovačić, one of Croatia's most notable poets of the 20th century, and the site of a memorial museum dedicated to him, opened in 1975.

== Name ==
It was recorded as Lukou dol on the 1673 map of Stjepan Glavač.

== History ==
=== Pre-Turkish ===
Lukovdol was first mentioned on 22 February 1481 in a document freeing the citizens of Grič from tariffs in Lukovdol and elsewhere.

From the Modruše urbarium of 1486 it is known that the villagers of Lukovdol each paid 84 solidi to Lord Bernardin Frankopan annually, in addition to 3 soldini at Christmastide (a lower rate due to their poverty). Each farm encompassed an average of 9.6 morgens of land, of which 4 were always pasture. The glebe was only 6 morgens, of which 4 pasture. By that time, only 13 farms remained, as 7 had been left uninhabited (Bartolovo, Grdče, Ivanče, Jureče, Pičeće, Prstačje, and the farms of Dujam Kulčić and Grgur Lagotić). The survivors included 4 Ostronić farms (Bartol, Grge, Vid, Vrban), 2 Bartolić farms (Mavar, Mike), and the farms of Stipan Grišnjaković, Jake Grklić, Mavar Jarnedaković, Petar Mihalić, Mavar Peretić, Janže Požrelić, and Broz Strgarić.

=== Turkish wars ===
According to a manuscript by priest Belić, the parish of Lukovdol was founded in 1604.

In 1769, the Lukovdol parish had a population of 2267.

The volunteer fire department DVD Lukovdol was founded on 28 October 1894, and is today part of the VZ grada Vrbovsko. Its current commander is Dorijan Mihelić.

Many Slovene residents of Kočevsko, and even Serbs of Marindol, used to go to Lukovdol for confession.

=== WWII ===
At 13:00 on 14 June 1942, a group of 60 Partisans arrived in Lukovdol, where they set up guards and held a rally until 19:00, when they retreated to the Lujzijana above Lukovdol, stopping all traffic toward Lukovdol.

On 4–5 June, Partisans held another rally in Lukovdol.

=== Recent ===
The Lukovdol-Plemenitaš road was asphalted in 1981.

In 2010, a 19 year old from Lukovdol stole 20 metres (66 ft) of copper wire from the transformer station in Hambarište.

On 30 August 2012, a leak in Vrbovsko forced a water shutoff that affected Lukovdol, among others.

Lukovdol was hit by the 2014 Dinaric ice storm.

On 10 August 2022, a fire burned much of a house in Lukovdol.

In 2023, the road to houses 72 and 78 and the road to Košac from house 34a were asphalted.

== Demographics ==
As of 2021, there were only 11 inhabitants under the age of 20.

Village of Lukovdol: Population trends 1857–2021
v

| population | 423 | 349 | 437 | 437 | 394 | 319 | 286 | 281 | 306 | 293 | 274 | 288 | 219 | 256 | 157 | 129 | 104 |
| | 1857 | 1869 | 1880 | 1890 | 1900 | 1910 | 1921 | 1931 | 1948 | 1953 | 1961 | 1971 | 1981 | 1991 | 2001 | 2011 | 2021 |

Note:In 2001 it was enlarged with the addition of Rtić and Gorenci. Sources: Croatian Bureau of Statistics publications

In 1870, Lukovdol's porezna općina included Ertić, Gorenci, Podvučnik, Breg and Grišniki. Lukovdol itself had 54 houses and 349 people. Breg had 3 houses and 24 people.

In 1890, Lukovdol itself had 74 houses and 429 people. Brieg had 4 houses and 20 people. Cetin had 1 house and 8 people. The villagers of all of these were under Lukovdol parish, school and tax districts, but were administered by Severin. The tax district of Lukovdol also administered Ertić, Gorenci and Grišniki (Gorenci).

=== Further reading ===
- Kraljevski zemaljski statistički ured (1903). Političko i sudbeno razdieljenje i Repertorij prebivališta Kraljevina Hrvatske i Slavonije po stanju od 1. travnja 1903. Zagreb: Kraljevska hrvatsko-slavonsko-dalmatinska zemaljska vlada, 🖶 Kraljevska zemaljska tiskara.
- Kraljevski zemaljski statistički ured (May 1913). "Repertorij prebivališta po županijama, upravnim kotarima, gradovima, upravnim i poreznim općinama". Političko i sudbeno razdjeljenje i Repertorij prebivališta Kraljevina Hrvatske i Slavonije po stanju od 1. siječnja 1913. Zagreb: Kraljevska hrvatsko-slavonsko-dalmatinska zemaljska vlada, 🖶 Kraljevska zemaljska tiskara. pp. 1–126. Page 33.

=== Prosopography ===
At the time of the Modruš Urbarium, Lukovdol was home to Mavar Bartolić, Mike Bartolić, Stipa Grišnjaković, Jake Grklić, Mavar Jarnedaković, Petar Mihalić, Vrban Ostronić and his brother, Grga Ostronić, Vid Ostronić, Bartol Ostronić, Mavar Peretić, Janže Požrelić, and Broz Strgarić. The surnames were Bartolić, Grišnjaković, Grklić, Jarnedaković, Mihalić, Ostronić, Peretić, Požrelić, and Strgarić. (Note: See Barac-Grum and Finka 1981, "Govori i nazivlje". Gorski kotar. Delnice.)

In recent times, Lukovdol parish records include surnames Babić, Barić, Barković, Beljan, Bricelj, Cvetić, Dean, Dodig, Flajnik, Florijan, Grišnik, Grgurić, Hudorović, Jakovac, Jerant, Kapš, Kovačić, Krizmanić, Lesac, Madronić, Maršal, Martinac, Medved, Mikić, Mufić, Osojnički, Pađan, Palijan, Panijan, Ralić, Ribić, Rožman, Sečen, Šepčić, Šihman, Šneler, Špehar, Štefanac, Štrk, Šutej, Troha, Vlašić, Vučić, Vrbanac, Žagar, Župan, Žuteg.

Some surnames are still patronymic, such as Grgurić. Many are formed from nicknames (Lesac, Troha), others from social positions (Župan), and others from trades (Špehar, Žagar). Osojnički is toponymic, from Osojnik. Some are of foreign origin. Šneler (<Schneller) was first mentioned in Gorski Kotar in 1738, Maršal (French) in 1861, and Šihman in the 19th century.

Of those surnames, only Grišnjaković has survived (in the form Grišnik). With or without taking the Galton–Watson process into account, that points to the severity of the depopulation during the Turkish Wars. Barac-Grum noted the frequency of patronymic surnames in the Pre-Turkish period, contrasting with the modern surnames.

== Religion ==
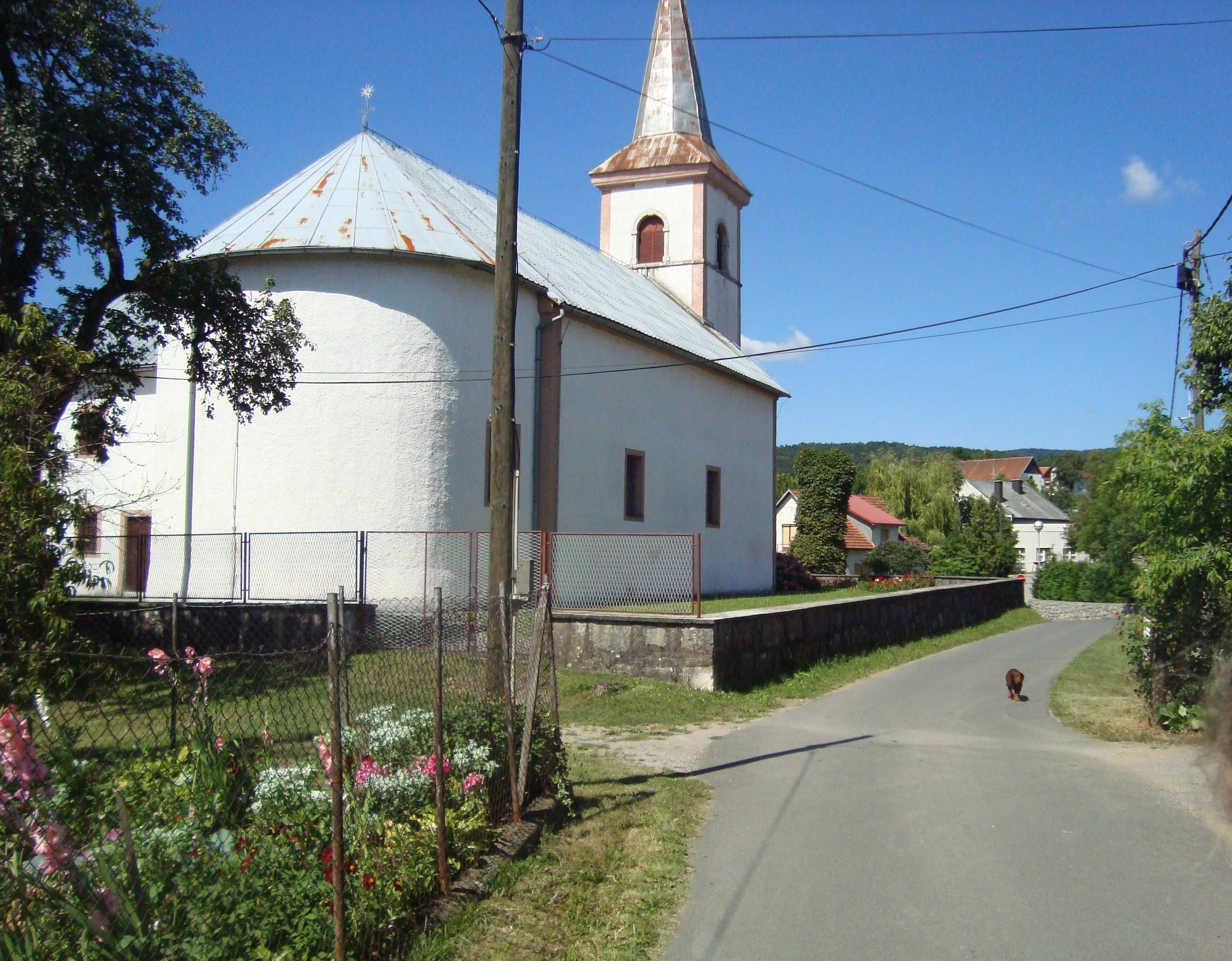
Sv. Marije church

Ecclesiastically, the Lukovdol parish is under the Delnice diaconate, in turn under the Rijeka Archdiocese. ==Religion== Its Catholic parish was founded in 1604, and its parish church was built towards the end of the 17th century.

In the 1930s, the parish numbered up to 4000 souls. By 1939, its parish had 2200 souls, plus 1000 outside the country; it also administered the nearby parish of Plemenitaš. By 1974, its parish had 1249 souls, plus 114 outside the country.

Parish priests:

- Ivan Kumbatović (1913–1921), member of the Old Church Slavonic Academy
- ...
- Julije Kessler (b. Borovnica 1904-03-20, primiz Ljubljana 1929-06-29)
- ...
- Franc Rihtarič (b. Oroslavci near Sveti Jurij ob Ščavnici 1920-09-27, primiz Rijeka 1955-07-03)
- ...
- Branko Dragojević (July 2005 –)

== Governance ==
=== National ===
On the day of the 1867 Croatian parliamentary election in Lukovdol općina, 8 December, SP partisan Marko Domitrović of Zdihovo arrived claiming to have been sent by Ban Levin Rauch and Grand Župan Mirko Bogović. First, before the elections, he went around urging voters to vote for the government's candidate, issuing threats to state workers that they would lose their jobs if they did not vote for the NUS. Then, once the elections had begun, he blocked the entrance to the poll in the parish priest's house with the justification that elections were to be held in the open, despite the locally snowy conditions. The president of the deputation, Radoslav Lopašić, together with secretary Kovačić, pointed out to Domitrović that he did not himself have the right to vote in Lukovdol as a non-resident, at which Domitrović angrily retorted that "in three days" he would "take him away to Zagreb in chains". Lopašić asked him to show a legal document granting him such rights, and when he failed to produce one, he pointed out to Domitrović that as a judge he could have him arrested, but did not because it was a Sunday and the bell rang for mass. Many listened to Domitrović anyway and some left for Plemenitaš, where J. Medved was ultimately chosen. The next day, judge Lopašić escorted Domitrović on his way to Zagreb, but only after getting Domitrović to sign an admission that he had been sent by Rauch and Bogović.

=== Local ===
As of its foundation on 3 March 2008, it is the seat of a local committee encompassing Gorenci, Rtić, Dolenci, Draga Lukovdolska, Lesci, Nadvučnik, Vučnik and Podvučnik. Lukovdol has a statistical village area of 5.91 km^{2}

Presidents of local committee:

- Arsen Štefanac (2008)
- Eduard Krizmanić (2009)
- Damir Krizmanić (2013)
- Pavao Babić (2017)
- Mario Medved (2021)

Municipal notaries:

- ? (–1871)

== Notable people ==
Notable people that were born or lived in Lukovdol include:

- Josip Slivec
- Martin Grišnik, Seljački savez candidate for Skupština representative in the 1920 election
- Ivan Goran Kovačić (21 March 1913 – 12 July 1943)
- Vladimir Krizmanić (18 June 1935 – 25 October 2015), parish priest of Brod Moravice from 1962, then Kosinj from 1965, then Ravna Gora from 1977 through 2008

== Culture ==
=== Goranovo proljeće ===
The Goranovo proljeće poetry competition has been held annually since 1964 on the birthday of Ivan Goran Kovačić, the 21st of March (later also World Poetry Day, sometimes the March equinox),

== Attractions ==
A memorial park with the name Gorandol, 3,360 square metres (36,200 ft^{2}) in area, was created in 1983 by S. Jurković and B. Radimir above the cemetery. It hosts the annual national poetry competition Goranovo proljeće.

== Sports ==
Beginning in 2013, the 7 stage 260 kilometres (160 mi) long Cycling Trail of Gorski Kotar (Croatian: Goranska biciklistička transverzala) passes through Lukovdol.

The "Gorski Kotar Bike Tour", held annually since 2012, sometimes goes through Lukovdol, such as in the first leg for 2024.

== Infrastructure ==
Lukovdol has a post office, an Udaljeni pretplatnički stupanj (UPS).

The water storage unit in Nadvučnik, with a capacity of 400 cubic metres (14,000 ft^{3}) at an elevation of 444 metres (1,457 ft), is also responsible for Lukovdol, Podvučnik, Vučnik, Gorenci and part of Draga Lukovdolska.

== Selected works ==
- Benyovsky, Lucija (2003). Ivan Goran Kovačić i njegov zavičaj [Ivan Goran Kovačić and His Environment] (in Croatian). Zagreb, Lukovdol: Hrvatski povijesni muzej, Memorijalni muzej Ivan Goran Kovačić. ISBN 953-6046-28-8.

== Bibliography ==
- Melem Hajdarović, Mihela (2023-06-14). "Glavačeva karta Hrvatske iz 1673. – njezini toponimi, geografski sadržaj i historijskogeografski kontekst" [Glavač’s map of Croatia from 1673: Its toponyms, geographical content, and historical-geographical context]. Studia lexicographica. 17 (32): 47–78. doi:10.33604/sl.17.32.2. eISSN 2459-5578.
- Draganović, Krunoslav (1939-04-20). Opći šematizam Katoličke crkve u Jugoslaviji. Sarajevo: Akademija "Regina Apostolorum".
- Draganović, Krunoslav; Bezić, Srećko [in Croatian]; Crnković, Josip; Lešnik, Rafael; Mršo, Ivan [in Croatian]; Reven, Zdravko [in Slovenian]; Weber, Hinko (1975-05-05). Opći šematizam Katoličke Crkve u Jugoslaviji 1974 [General Directory of the Catholic Church in Yugoslavia 1974] (in Serbo-Croatian). Zagreb: Hrvatsko književno društvo sv. Ćirila i Metoda.
