= Bogović =

Bogović (Serbian Cyrillic: Боговић, pl. Bogovići) is a Serbo-Croatian surname. It is spelled as Bogovič in Slovenia. The name is derived from the word bog, meaning "God".

Notable people with the name include:

- Davorin Bogović (born 1960), Croatian rock vocalist
- Dušan Bogović, Serbian bass guitarist, member of Van Gogh
- Erika Bogovic (born 1934), Austrian gymnast
- Franc Bogovič (born 1963), Slovenian politician
- Mile Bogović (1939–2020), Croatian Catholic bishop
- Mirko Bogović (1816–1893), Croatian poet and politician
- Nataša Avšič Bogovič (born 1971), Slovenian politician

== See also ==
- Bogić
- Bogojević
- Bogovići
