= Borojevići =

Borojevići may refer to:

- Borojevići, Croatia, a village near Donji Kukuruzari
- Borojevići, Bosnia and Herzegovina, a village near Stolac

== See also ==
- Borojević
