= Bogovići =

Bogovići may refer to:

- Bogovići, Bosnia and Herzegovina, a village on the municipality of Pale at Bosnia and Herzegovina
- Bogovići, Croatia, a village on the municipality of Malinska-Dubašnica at Croatia

It may also refer to:

- Donji Bogovići, a village on the municipality of Goražde at Bosnia and Herzegovina
- Gornji Bogovići, a village on the municipality of Goražde at Bosnia and Herzegovina

== See also ==
- Bogavići, a village on the municipality of Foča at Bosnia and Herzegovina
- Bogović, a Serbo-Croatian surname
