= Bellia gens =

Ancient Roman family

The gens Bellia, also written Billia and Bilia, was an obscure plebeian family at ancient Rome. No members of this gens are mentioned in history, but several are known from inscriptions.

== Origin ==
As the Bellii are not mentioned by ancient writers, there are no traditions relating to the origin of this gens, and the nomen is not listed among the gentilicia for which Chase was able to ascribe a particular origin; it resembles other gentiles formed using the suffixes -ilius, -ellius, and -illius, frequently derived from cognomina ending in -ulus, but sometimes from words ending in -illus or -ellus. The root was probably bellus, handsome or beautiful, but the use of surnames such as Clemens and Pacatus by some members of this gens suggests that the name was associated with bellum, war. The nomen Duilius or Duellius was derived from an older form of bellum, and so might be a cognate of Bellius. The nomen Bellienus seems to be derived from this gentilicium, which may give a clue to the geographical origin of the family, since the suffix -enus was common in names from Picenum and Umbria, and some of the inscriptions of the Bellii are from Pisaurum in Umbria.

== Praenomina ==
The main praenomina of the Bellii were Gaius, Marcus, Titus, and Numerius. The first three were very common throughout Roman history, while Numerius was somewhat more distinctive, and typical of the Roman countryside. The only other regular praenomen found among the Bellii was Lucius, perhaps the most abundant of all Roman names. Primus, given in the filiation of a Roman matron from Gallia Narbonensis, was an archaic praenomen, but in its masculine form it was little used in historical times, except as a surname, or in Cisalpine Gaul, where unusual praenomina were fashionable. It could have been the praenomen of the woman's father, but was more probably his surname. Suavis, given in another filiation, is not known as a praenomen, and may also have been the father's surname, but because one of the persons named in the same inscription was either a slave or freedwoman, it may be that the Suavis referred to had been a slave, or at least was not a Roman citizen, and so did not possess a regular praenomen.

== Branches and cognomina ==
There is no evidence that the Bellii were ever divided into distinct families. They used a variety of personal surnames, some of which belonged to freedmen, and were their original personal names. Other surnames included Belliolus, a diminutive of Bellius, evidently given to a little boy; Clemens, gentle, mild; Marcellinus, a diminutive of Marcellus, probably indicating that an earlier ancestor was named Marcellus; Pacatus, peaceful, calm; Plautus, given to someone with broad or flat feet; and Reginus, indicating someone who came from Rhegium.

== Members ==
This list includes abbreviated praenomina. For an explanation of this practice, see filiation.

- Bellia, inscribed on some pottery from the present site of Aventicum in Helvetia.
- Bilia Ɔ. l., a freedwoman named in an inscription from Rome.
- Belia Primi f., the wife of Marcus Vibius Campanus, buried at Nemausus in Gallia Narbonensis.
- Bellius, set up a monument at Catalaunum in Gallia Lugdunensis; perhaps the same Bellius named in inscriptions from Durocortorum and Bagacum in Gallia Belgica.
- Bellius, named in an inscription from Aquae Grani in Germania Inferior.
- Bilius, named in an inscription from Pompeii in Campania.
- Billius, the father of Parthenis, a young woman buried at Rome, with a monument from her father, her husband, Restitutus, and friend, Saturninus, aged twenty-three years, eight months, and fourteen days.
- Bellius Suavi f., the husband of Novia, named in an inscription found near Schönenberg-Kübelberg, formerly part of Germania Superior.
- Lucius Bilius T. f, buried at Pisaurum in Umbria, along with his brother, Titus, in a tomb built by Titus' wife, Rutilia Prima, dating to the late second or early third century.
- Marcus Bilius C. f., named in an inscription from Atria in Venetia and Histria.
- Titus Bilius T. f., the husband of Rutilia Prima, was buried at Pisaurum, together with his brother, Lucius, in a tomb built by Rutilia in the late second or early third century.
- Numerius Billius N. l. Amandus, a freedman buried at Rome during the latter half of the first century, aged fifty-eight.
- Bellia Atticia, the daughter of Bellius Atticianus, who dedicated a monument in his memory at the present site of Anglefort, formerly part of Gallia Lugdunensis.
- Bellius Atticianus, buried at the present site of Anglefort, aged twenty-five years and six? days, with a monument from his daughter, Bellia Atticia.
- Gaius Bellius C. f. Belliolus, the son of Gaius Bellius Octavius and Firmia Sextiola, buried at Lugdunum in Gallia Lugdunensis, aged seven years, four months, and four days.
- Numerius Billius Clemens, dedicated a monument at Rome to his wife, Cusinia Capitolina.
- Marcus Bilius Epictetus, a soldier serving in the century of Gnaeus Pompeius Pelas at Rome in AD 70.
- Marcus Bilius M. l. Eros, a freedman named in an inscription from Rome.
- Bellius Eutyches Sallustius, dedicated a monument to his wife, Sextia Panthia, at Ostia in Latium.
- Bellia Laetina, built a tomb for herself and her family at the present site of Borojevici, formerly part of Dalmatia.
- Marcus Bellius Marcellinus, made a libationary offering to Jupiter Optimus Maximus and the local god, found at Obernburg am Main, formerly part of Germania Superior.
- Bellia Nicobule, the wife of Gaius Bellius Fortunatus, and foster-mother of Bellia Trophime, a girl buried at Rome in the second century.
- Bellia C. f. Octaviola, the daughter of Gaius Bellius Octavius and Firmia Sextiola.
- Gaius Bellius Octavius, the husband of Firmia Sextiola, and father of Gaius Bellius Belliolus and Bellia Octaviola.
- Gaius Billius Pacatus, a native of Dertona in Liguria, one of the soldiers named on the Tropaeum Trajani, a monument built by Trajan in Moesia Inferior, honouring the Roman servicemen who died fighting the Dacians in AD 101 and 102.
- Bellius Plautus, named in a libationary inscription dedicated to Jupiter Optimus Maximus, found at the present site of Walheim, formerly part of Germania Superior.
- Bellius Reginus, buried at the present site of Anglefort, aged twenty, with a monument set up by his heirs.
- Bellia Secundilla, buried at the present site of Blauzac, formerly part of Gallia Narbonensis.
- Gaius Bellius Sosius, the husband of Bellia Nicobule, and foster-father of Bellia Trophime, a girl buried at Rome during the second century.
- Marcus Bellius Te[...], named in a libationary inscription dedicated to Mithras at Argentoratum in Germania Superior.
- Bellia Trophime, foster-daughter of Gaius Bellius Sosimus and Bellia Nicobule, buried at Rome during the second century, in a tomb built by her foster parents and Julia Fortunata, aged seven years, ten months, and twenty days.
- Billia T. f. Veneria, named in an inscription from Lugdunum.

== See also ==
- List of Roman gentes

== Bibliography ==
- Theodor Mommsen et alii, Corpus Inscriptionum Latinarum (The Body of Latin Inscriptions, abbreviated CIL), Berlin-Brandenburgische Akademie der Wissenschaften (1853–present).
- René Cagnat et alii, L'Année épigraphique (The Year in Epigraphy, abbreviated AE), Presses Universitaires de France (1888–present).
- George Davis Chase, "The Origin of Roman Praenomina", in Harvard Studies in Classical Philology, vol. VIII, pp. 103–184 (1897).
- La Carte Archéologique de la Gaule (Archaeological Map of Gaul, abbreviated CAG), Académie des Inscriptions et Belles-Lettres (1931–present).
- Bruna Forlati Tamaro, "Inscrizioni Inedite di Adria" (Unedited Inscriptions from Adria, abbreviated "IIAdria"), in Epigraphica, vol. 18, pp. 50–76 (1956).
- John C. Traupman, The New College Latin & English Dictionary, Bantam Books, New York (1995).
- Radoslav Dodig, "Monuments épigraphiques provenant du Conventus de Narona" (Epigraphic Monuments from the Conventus of Narona), in Izdanja Hrvatskog arheološkog društva, vol. 22, pp. 233–252 (2003).
- Richard Sylvestre, "Les graffitis sur céramique d'Avenches: Premières observations" (Graffiti on Ceramics from Avenches: First Impressions), in Inscriptions mineures: Nouveautés et réflexions, Michel E. Fuchs, Richard Sylvestre, & Christophe Schmidt Heidenreich, eds., Bern (2012), pp. 25–43.
