= Lesci =

- Village
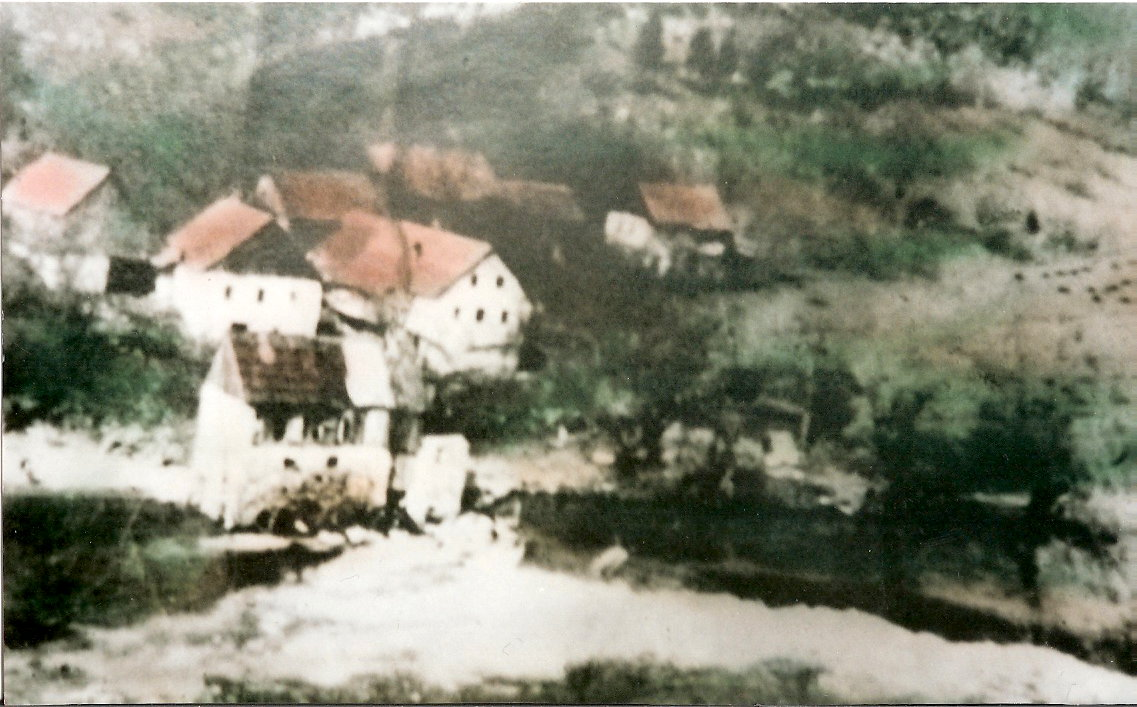
- Lesci in the first half of the 20th century.
- Interactive map of Lesci
- Location within Croatia
- Coordinates: 45.423968°N 15.125206°E
- Country: Croatia
- County: Primorje-Gorski Kotar County
- City: Vrbovsko
- Community: Lukovdol

Area
  - Total: 0.2 km^{2} (0.077 sq mi)
- Elevation: 178 m (584 ft)

Population (2021)
  - Total: 0
  - Density: 0.0/km^{2} (0.0/sq mi)
- Time zone: UTC+1 (CET)
  - Summer (DST): UTC+2 (CEST)
- Postal code: 51326
- Area code: +385 051

Lesci is a village in Croatia, under the Vrbovsko township, in Primorje-Gorski Kotar County. It is a ghost town.

== History ==
Ivan Goran Kovačić wrote a poem about the accordion players of Lesci titled "Petr Breški harmonikaš":

Ako se je jókal ali smèjal
Zaprta bila vusta so i oči, -
Z harmoniko je svoje soze lèjal,
Čez tipke njeje smeh se njegov tòčil.
Njegòvo dušo imal njeji meh,
Njegòvo srce, njegov vzdih i smeh.
I celi život bil mu je popêvka,
Cel život tan'c, svati, pirovânje,
Muzìkal do svojèga je sršetka, -
I na oblâke š'l je v svatovânje...
To znadó sì: da je Petr Breški
Pri ajngeli hàrmonikâš nebêški.
To ní izmìslil nigdo, to so glasi
Od Boga prišli o mrtvâčke maše:
Čim plòvan zapopêval "Bože, spasi!"
Zagrmèle orgùlje so naše
Na tan'c - kudi muzìke Petròve -
I ko da celo selo v nebo zove!

In December 1942, Ivan Goran Kovačić crossed the Kupa at Lesci in Matija Paviša's (Note: Općinski bilježnik and legal representative of Vladimir Arko.) boat together with Vladimir Nazor on their way to join the Yugoslav Partisans. The news was featured on the BBC.

The 2014 Dinaric ice storm permanently blocked the old two-track dirt bridle path from Lesci to Košac.

In 2014 and 2015, the gravel road from Riblje by Severin na Kupi to Lesci was completed and equipped with benches.

== Demographics ==
As of 2011, it was one of four uninhabited statistical villages in Vrbovsko, along with Međedi, Podvučnik and Radočaj. These were followed by Gornji Vukšići.

Village of Lesci: Population trends 1857–2021
v

population		24	16	20	21	17	21	26	23	24	17
	1857	1869	1880	1890	1900	1910	1921	1931	1948	1953	1961	1971	1981	1991	2001	2011	2021

Note:A statistical village since 1869, under the name Brijeg from 1869 to 1900. Sources: Croatian Bureau of Statistics publications

=== Further reading ===
- Kraljevski zemaljski statistički ured (1903). Političko i sudbeno razdieljenje i Repertorij prebivališta Kraljevina Hrvatske i Slavonije po stanju od 1. travnja 1903. Zagreb: Kraljevska hrvatsko-slavonsko-dalmatinska zemaljska vlada, 🖶 Kraljevska zemaljska tiskara.
- Kraljevski zemaljski statistički ured (May 1913). "Repertorij prebivališta po županijama, upravnim kotarima, gradovima, upravnim i poreznim općinama". Političko i sudbeno razdjeljenje i Repertorij prebivališta Kraljevina Hrvatske i Slavonije po stanju od 1. siječnja 1913. Zagreb: Kraljevska hrvatsko-slavonsko-dalmatinska zemaljska vlada, 🖶 Kraljevska zemaljska tiskara. pp. 1–126. Page 33.

== Politics ==
As of its foundation on 3 March 2008, it belongs to the local committee of Lukovdol.

== Dialect ==
According to local former resident Lidija Žagar, the dialect of Lesci differed somewhat from the dialect of Lukovdol significantly in accent and vocabulary, but without being closer to dialects across the river.

== Gallery ==
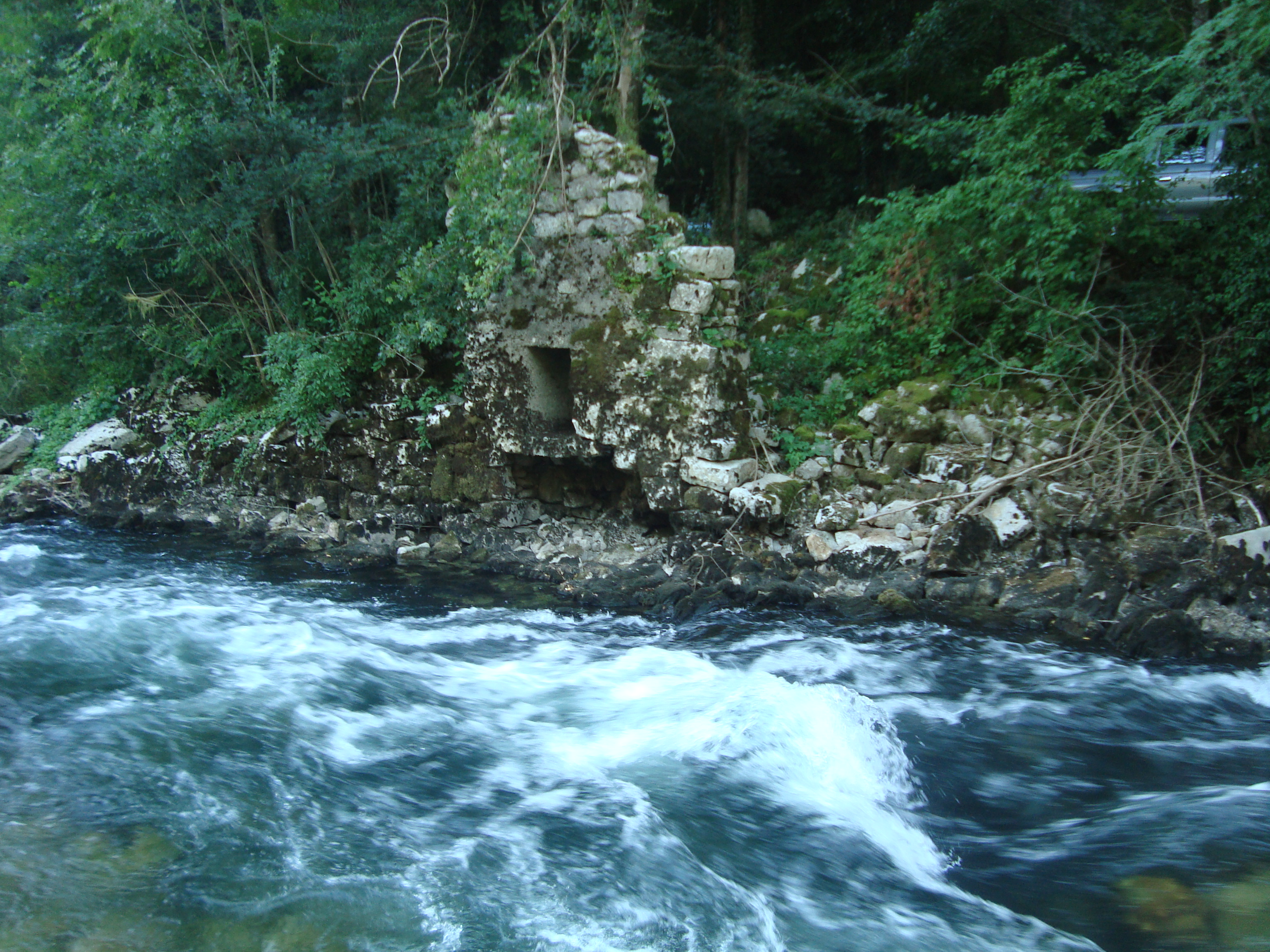
Remains of the mill

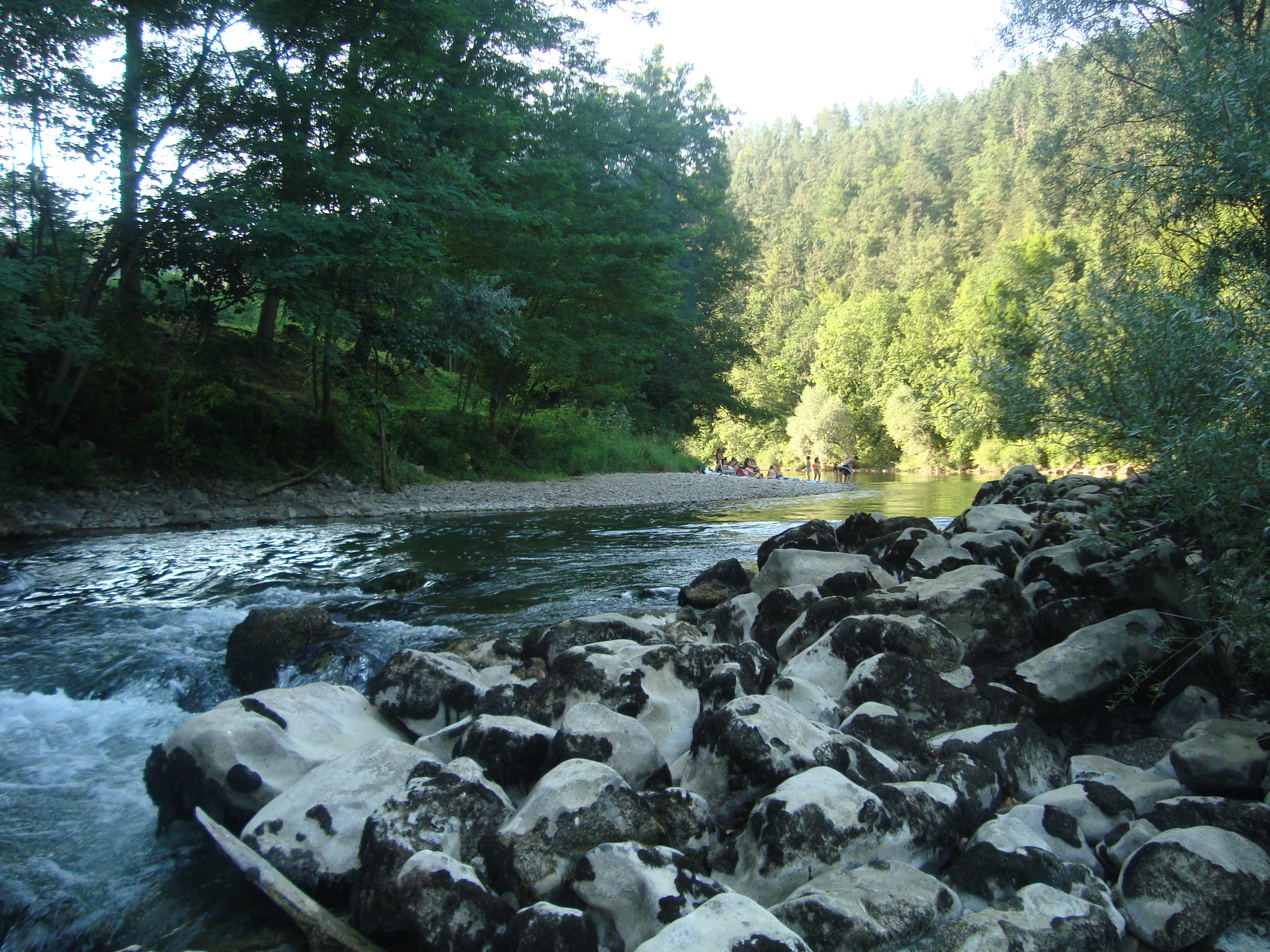
Remains of the weir

== Bibliography ==
- Korenčić, Mirko (1979). Naselja i stanovništvo Socijalističke Republike Hrvatske (1857–1971) [Villages and Population of the Socialist Republic of Croatia (1857–1971)]. Djela Jugoslavenske akademije znanosti i umjetnosti (in Serbo-Croatian). Vol. 54.
