= Bogić =

Bogić (Serbian Cyrillic: Богић) is a Serbo-Croatian male given name and surname, predominantly borne by ethnic Serbs, derived from the word bog meaning "god". It may refer to:

Given name

- Bogić Bogićević, Bosnian politician
- Bogić Bogićević (1955–2017), Serbian football coach
- Bogić Risimović (1926–1986), Yugoslav-Serbian painter
- Bogić Vujošević (born 1992) Serbian–Austrian basketball player

Surname

- Đorđe Bogić (1911–1941), murder victim and Serbian Orthodox saint
- Nikola Bogić (born 1981), Serbian footballer

== See also ==
- Bogović, surname
- Bogovčić, surname
- Bogojević, surname
- Božić, surname
- Bogići, toponym
- Bogićevica, mountain in Kosovo
- Bogićevići, village in Montenegro
