= Podvučnik =

- Village
- Interactive map of Podvučnik
- Location within Croatia
- Coordinates: 45.420°N 15.125°E
- Country: Croatia
- County: Primorje-Gorski Kotar County
- City: Vrbovsko
- Community: Lukovdol

Area
  - Total: 0.4 km^{2} (0.15 sq mi)
- Elevation: 310 m (1,020 ft)

Population (2021)
  - Total: 0
  - Density: 0.0/km^{2} (0.0/sq mi)
- Time zone: UTC+1 (CET)
  - Summer (DST): UTC+2 (CEST)
- Postal code: 51326
- Area code: +385 051

Podvučnik is a village in Croatia, under the Vrbovsko township, in Primorje-Gorski Kotar County.

== Demographics ==
As of 2011, it was one of four uninhabited statistical villages in Vrbovsko, along with Međedi, Lesci and Radočaj. These were followed by Gornji Vukšići.

Village of Podvučnik: Population trends 1857–2021
v

population	64	46	58	43	57	64	47	52	76	31	19	21	10	18	3
	1857	1869	1880	1890	1900	1910	1921	1931	1948	1953	1961	1971	1981	1991	2001	2011	2021

Sources: Croatian Bureau of Statistics publications

In 1870, Podvučnik, in Lukovdol's porezna općina, had 8 houses and 46 people.

=== Further reading ===
- Kraljevski zemaljski statistički ured (1903). Političko i sudbeno razdieljenje i Repertorij prebivališta Kraljevina Hrvatske i Slavonije po stanju od 1. travnja 1903. Zagreb: Kraljevska hrvatsko-slavonsko-dalmatinska zemaljska vlada, 🖶 Kraljevska zemaljska tiskara.
- Kraljevski zemaljski statistički ured (May 1913). "Repertorij prebivališta po županijama, upravnim kotarima, gradovima, upravnim i poreznim općinama". Političko i sudbeno razdjeljenje i Repertorij prebivališta Kraljevina Hrvatske i Slavonije po stanju od 1. siječnja 1913. Zagreb: Kraljevska hrvatsko-slavonsko-dalmatinska zemaljska vlada, 🖶 Kraljevska zemaljska tiskara. pp. 1–126. Page 33.

== Politics ==
As of its foundation on 3 March 2008, it belongs to the local committee of Lukovdol.

== Infrastructure ==
The water storage unit in Nadvučnik, with a capacity of 400 cubic metres (14,000 ft^{3}) at an elevation of 444 metres (1,457 ft), is also responsible for Lukovdol, Podvučnik, Vučnik, Gorenci and part of Draga Lukovdolska.

== Bibliography ==
=== Demography ===
- Korenčić, Mirko (1979). Naselja i stanovništvo Socijalističke Republike Hrvatske (1857–1971) [Villages and Population of the Socialist Republic of Croatia (1857–1971)]. Djela Jugoslavenske akademije znanosti i umjetnosti (in Serbo-Croatian). Vol. 54.

=== Genealogy ===
- Barac-Grum, Vida (1987-06-28). "Pogled na gorskokotarsku povijesnu antroponimiju" [A View into the Historical Anthroponymy of Gorski Kotar]. Rasprave Instituta za hrvatski jezik (in Croatian). 13 (1): 5–8. ISSN 1331-6745.
