= Bricelj =

Bricelj is a Slovene surname. Notable people with the surname include:

- Beti Bricelj (born 1974), Slovene painter
- Suzana Bricelj (born 1971), Slovene painter and illustrator
