= Belliena gens =

Ancient Roman family

The gens Belliena or Billiena was a minor plebeian family at ancient Rome. Bellienus is the form that occurs in writers, while Billienus is more common in inscriptions. Members of this gens are first mentioned toward the end of the Republic. Lucius Bellienus obtained the praetorship in 107 BC, but was prevented from obtaining the consulship. The Bellieni occur in history down to the time of Caesar, after which the family faded into obscurity; but others are known from inscriptions.

== Origin ==
Cicero refers to a Gaius Annius Bellienus, and from this it has been inferred that Bellienus might be a cognomen of the Annia gens; but even if this Bellienus or some of the others mentioned in history are correctly identified as Annii, the evidence from inscriptions demonstrates that Bellienus was a separate nomen gentilicium. The name belongs to a class of gentilicia formed using the suffix -enus, frequently found in Picenum and Umbria. Such names were typically derived from other gentilicia, rather than from place names, as was the case with the similar gentile-forming suffix -anus; in this case probably Bellius, also found as Billius, Belius, and Bilius.

== Praenomina ==
The main praenomina of the Bellieni were Lucius, Gaius, and Marcus. Other names occur infrequently, including one instance of the Oscan praenomen Salvius, appearing in the filiation of one of the family.

== Branches and cognomina ==
The Bellieni do not seem to have been divided into distinct families. They used a number of personal surnames, including Niger and Rufus, referring to black or red hair, respectively; Dexter, literally "right-handed", but figuratively "lucky" or "skilled"; Genialis, "genial"; and Vitalis, "vital". Actiacus was assumed by a soldier who had fought at the Battle of Actium in 31 BC. Messor, the name of another soldier, refers to one who reaps or mows. Several women of this gens bore Secunda or Tertia as surnames; these were old praenomina that gradually came to be treated as cognomina, typically being placed at the end of the name, although they retained their original individualizing function.

== Members ==
This list includes abbreviated praenomina. For an explanation of this practice, see filiation.

- Lucius C. f. Bellienus, (Note: Or perhaps Lucius Annius Bellienus, or Gaius Bellienus.) praetor in 107 BC, served under Gaius Marius in the war against Jugurtha and Bocchus. He is probably the same person as the Gaius Bellienus who was prevented from obtaining the consulship by the repeated selection of Marius. Cicero describes him as an accomplished orator, and learned in the law.
- Gaius Annius Bellienus, legate of Marcus Fonteius in Gallia Narbonensis, circa 74 BC.
- Bellienus, praetor circa 68 BC, was captured by pirates during his year of office. Events such as this, and the capture of another praetor, Sextilius, led to the granting of proconsular authority to Gnaeus Pompeius the following year, and his war against the pirates.
- Lucius Bellienus, (Note: Possibly an Annius.) uncle of Catiline, ordered by Sulla to kill Quintus Lucretius Afella, and condemned in 64 BC.
- Lucius Bellienus, (Note: An Annius in some sources.) whose house was burnt down after the murder of Caesar in 44 BC.
- Marcus Billienus M. f. Actiacus, a soldier in the eleventh legion, fought at the Battle of Actium in 31 BC, and was subsequently one of the colonists who settled at Ateste.
- Lucius Billienus S. f., named in an inscription from Beregra in Picenum, dating to the late first century BC, or early first century AD, together with Lucius Billienus Niger and Gaius Billienus Rufus.
- Lucius Billienus Marathus, built a tomb at Casilinum in Campania for himself and his wife, Cornelia Prima, dating to the late first century BC, or early first century AD.
- Lucius Billienus L. f. Niger, named in an inscription from Beregra, together with Gaius Billienus Rufus, possibly his brother, and another Lucius Billienus.
- Gaius Billienus L. f. Rufus, named in an inscription from Beregra, together with Lucius Billienus Niger, possibly his brother, and another Lucius Billienus.
- Billienus, named in an inscription from Rome, dating to the first half of the first century AD.
- Gaius Billienus C. l. Philogenes, a freedman, built a tomb for himself and Gaius Laecanius, another freedman, at Pola in Venetia and Histria, dating to the first half of the first century AD.
- Billiena Secunda, buried at Rome, was the wife of Paezon, a slave of Gaius Bellicius Natalis, perhaps the consul of AD 68.
- Titus Billienus Dexter, a native of Libarna, was a speculator, or scout, serving in the century of Rufus, probably in AD 119.

=== Undated Bellieni ===
- Billiena, the wife of Didius Barbus and mother of Didia Decuma. She and Oppianica built a tomb for her daughter at Larinum in Apulia.
- Billienus, named in an inscription from Pompeii in Campania.
- Gaius Billienus C. l., a freedman buried at Praeneste in Latium.
- Lucius Billienus, buried at Patrae in Achaia.
- Billiena Donata, the wife of Quintus Valerius Restutus, and mother of Valerius Ingenuus, a soldier in the fourteenth legion, and Valeria Restuta, who died aged twenty. Donata's husband built a family sepulchre at Savaria in Pannonia Superior.
- Gaius Billienus Fructus, dedicated a monument at Rome to his wife, Geminia Cauma, aged fifty-two.
- Lucius Bellienus Genialis, buried at Puteoli in Campania, aged thirty-three years, seven months, and fourteen days, with a monument from his wife, Fannia Secundina.
- Billiena Marcellina, buried at Aquileia in Venetia and Histria.
- Lucius Bilienus Messor, a centurion named in an inscription from Vindonissa in Germania Superior.
- Billienus M. (f.?) Met[...], named in an inscription from Aquileia.
- Lucius Billienus Neo, named in an inscription from Rome.
- Billiena Secunda, buried at Rome in a tomb built by the freedman Aulus Octavius Diocles for himself, his freedmen, and several others.
- Billiena Sal. f. Secunda, the wife of Gnaeus Sulpicius Luccio, and mother of Lucius Sulpicius Severus, who named his parents in his will, according to an inscription at Mediolanum in Cisalpine Gaul.
- Billiena Ɔ. l. Tertia, a freedwoman named in an inscription from Praeneste.
- Gaius Billienus Vitalis, built a monument at Poetovio in Pannonia Superior for Gaius Cornelius Verus, a native of Dertona in Liguria, and veteran of the second legion, aged fifty.
- Lucius Billienus L. l. Z[...], a freedman who became a grocer at Rome.

== See also ==
- Bellienus
- List of Roman gentes

== Bibliography ==
- Marcus Tullius Cicero, Brutus, Philippicae, Pro Fonteio, Pro Lege Manilia.
- Dionysius of Halicarnassus, Romaike Archaiologia.
- Titus Livius (Livy), History of Rome.
- Quintus Asconius Pedianus, Commentarius in Oratio Ciceronis In Toga Candida (Commentary on Cicero's Oration In Toga Candida).
- Lucius Mestrius Plutarchus (Plutarch), Lives of the Noble Greeks and Romans.
- Appianus Alexandrinus (Appian), Bella Mithridatica (The Mithridatic Wars).
- Lucius Cassius Dio Cocceianus (Cassius Dio), Roman History.
- Dictionary of Greek and Roman Biography and Mythology, William Smith, ed., Little, Brown and Company, Boston (1849).
- Theodor Mommsen et alii, Corpus Inscriptionum Latinarum (The Body of Latin Inscriptions, abbreviated CIL), Berlin-Brandenburgische Akademie der Wissenschaften (1853–present).
- Notizie degli Scavi di Antichità (News of Excavations from Antiquity, abbreviated NSA), Accademia dei Lincei (1876–present).
- George Davis Chase, "The Origin of Roman Praenomina", in Harvard Studies in Classical Philology, vol. VIII, pp. 103–184 (1897).
- T. Robert S. Broughton, The Magistrates of the Roman Republic, American Philological Association (1952).
- Bruna Forlati Tamaro, "Inscrizioni Inedite di Adria" (Unedited Inscriptions from Adria, abbreviated "IIAdria"), in Epigraphica, vol. 18, pp. 50–76 (1956).
- Herbert Nesselhauf and Hans Lieb, "Dritter Nachtrag zu CIL XIII: Inschriften aus den germanischen Provinzen und dem Treverergebiet" (Third Supplement to CIL XIII: Inscriptions from the Germanic Provinces and the Lands of the Treveri), in Bericht der Römisch-Germanischen Kommission, vol. 40, pp. 120-228 (1959).
- Picus: Studi e ricerche sulle marche nell'antichità (Studies and Research on Marks from Antiquity), Macareta (1981–present).
- Giovanni Battista Brusin, Inscriptiones Aquileiae (Inscriptions of Aquileia, abbreviated InscrAqu), Udine (1991–1993).
- Mika Kajava, Roman Female Praenomina: Studies in the Nomenclature of Roman Women, Acta Instituti Romani Finlandiae (1994).
- Athanasios D. Rizakis, Achaie II. La cité de Patras: Épigraphie et histoire (Achaia II: The City of Patras: Epigraphy and History), Athens (1998).
