= Borojević =

Borojević (Serbian Cyrillic: Боројевић; pl. Borojevići, Боројевићи) is a Serbian and Croatian surname. It derives from personal name Boroje (Бороје), derived from the word bor meaning "pine", with the possessive suffix -ev (Boroje's). The suffix ić is a diminutive designation, or descendant designation. Thus the last name can be translated as Boroje's son.

People with last name Borojević:

- Svetozar Borojević von Bojna, Austro-Hungarian field marshal described as one of the finest defensive strategists of the First World War
- Igor Borojević (1963–2018), Serbian musician
- Petar Borojević (1916–1982), National Hero of Yugoslavia
- Nikola Borojević (1795–1872), Serbian poet
- Slavko Borojević (1919–1999), Yugoslav academician and plant geneticist

== See also ==
- Bogojević
- Borojevići, Croatia
- Borojevići, Bosnia and Herzegovina
- Bor, Serbia
