= Goranovo proljeće =

Goranovo proljeće is a Croatian national poetry festival that has been held annually since 1964 on the birthday of Ivan Goran Kovačić, the 21st of March (later also World Poetry Day, sometimes the March equinox),

As a part of the festival, the Ivan Goran Kovačić award, not to be confused with the young poet's award Goran introduced by the festival in 1977, was first presented on 1 January 1965 as "Vjesnikova nagrada" by Vjesnik. The name changed to its current form in 1990. It has been awarded for best anthology of the previous year 42 times as of 2025:

1. 1965: Petar Šegedin
2. 1966: Ranko Marinković
3. 1967: Meša Selimović
4. 1968: Miroslav Krleža
5. 1969: Rafo Bogišić
6. 1970: Drago Ivanišević
7. 1971: Tomislav Ladan
8. 1972: Karlo Štajner
9. 1973: Marko Ristić
10. 1974: Jure Franičević-Pločar
11. 1975: Oskar Davičo
12. 1976: Mirko Božić
13. 1977: Danilo Kiš
14. 1978: Marijan Matković
15. 1979: Jure Kaštelan
16. 1980: Jara Ribnikar
17. 1981: Sreten Asanović
18. 1982: Vojin Jelić
19. 1983: Mihailo Lalić
20. 1984: Marin Franičević
21. 1985: Ivan Aralica
22. 1986: Matko Peić
23. 1987: Irena Vrkljan
24. 1988: Vesna Krmpotić
25. 1989: Borislav Pekić
26. 1993: Ranko Marinković
27. 1998: Slavko Mihalić
28. 2000: Aleksandar Flaker
29. 2002: Josip Vaništa
30. 2003: Nedjeljko Fabrio
31. 2004: Renato Baretić
32. 2005: Danijel Dragojević
33. 2006: Dubravka Oraić Tolić, Ivana Sajko
34. 2007: Zdravko Zima
35. 2008: Josip Mlakić
36. 2009: Anka Žagar
37. 2010: Zoran Kravar
38. 2011: Dubravka Ugrešić
39. 2019: Martina Vidaić
40. 2021: Evelina Rudan
41. 2023: Senko Karuza
42. 2025: Marija Andrijašević

The Goranov vijenac award was first awarded in 1971, and was won by the following for their lifetime corpus (made biennial in 2018):

1. 1971: Drago Ivanišević
2. 1972: Pero Zubac
3. 1973: Zvonimir Golob
4. 1974: Dobrica Erić
5. 1975: Ahmed Muhamed Imamović
6. 1976: Dobriša Cesarić
7. 1977: Vesna Parun
8. 1978: Jagoda Zamoda
9. 1979: Šime Vučetić
10. 1980: Dane Zajc
11. 1981: Dušan Kostić
12. 1982: Dragutin Tadijanović
13. 1983: Marin Franičević
14. 1984: Vladimir Popović
15. 1985: Stevan Raičković
16. 1986: Jure Kaštelan
17. 1987: Mateja Matevski
18. 1988: Oskar Davičo
19. 1989: Jure Franičević-Pločar
20. 1990: Slavko Mihalić
21. 1991: Ivan Slamnig
22. 1992: Danijel Dragojević
23. 1993: Antun Šoljan
24. 1994: Anka Žagar
25. 1995: Luko Paljetak
26. 1996: Nikica Petrak
27. 1997: Veselko Koroman
28. 1998: Nikola Milićević
29. 1999: Zvonimir Mrkonjić
30. 2000: Boris Maruna
31. 2001: Zvonko Maković
32. 2002: Branko Maleš
33. 2003: Arsen Dedić
34. 2004: Milorad Stojević
35. 2005: Ivan Rogić Nehajev
36. 2006: Andriana Škunca
37. 2007: Mile Stojić
38. 2008: Jasna Melvinger
39. 2009: Branimir Bošnjak
40. 2010: Petar Gudelj
41. 2011: Delimir Rešicki
42. 2012: Stjepan Gulin
43. 2013: Branko Čegec
44. 2014: Gordana Benić
45. 2015: Mario Šuško
46. 2016: Sonja Manojlović
47. 2017: (Note: The only year it was not held in Lukovdol, because the Hasanbegović ministry allocated funds insufficient to pay for transportation. After Vrbovsko hosted a rival event in response, the decision was made to hold a closing ceremony in Lukovdol, and then bring it back to Lukovdol.) Dorta Jagić
48. 2018: Tonko Maroević
49. 2020: Miroslav Mićanović
50. 2022: Vesna Biga
51. 2024: Miroslav Kirin
