= Vučnik =

- Village
- Interactive map of Vučnik
- Location within Croatia
- Coordinates: 45.418°N 15.124°E
- Country: Croatia
- County: Primorje-Gorski Kotar County
- City: Vrbovsko
- Community: Lukovdol

Area
  - Total: 1.7 km^{2} (0.66 sq mi)

Population (2021)
  - Total: 12
  - Density: 7.1/km^{2} (18/sq mi)
- Time zone: UTC+1 (CET)
  - Summer (DST): UTC+2 (CEST)
- Postal code: 51326
- Area code: +385 051

Vučnik is a village in Croatia, under the Vrbovsko township, in Primorje-Gorski Kotar County.

== History ==
In 1860–1879, Matija Mažuranić wrote a 62 folio manuscript today titled Writings on the Building of Roads in Gorski Kotar and Lika (Croatian: Spisi o gradnji cesta u Gorskom Kotaru i Lici), today with signature HR-ZaNSK R 6424. A 21 folio manuscript dated 1872 titled Darstellung der Entstehung des Baues ... der Luisenstrasse togethr with a translation by I. Mikloušić is kept as HR-ZaNSK R 4572.

In 1864, a rinderpest outbreak in Bosanci and Kasuni caused the Lujzijana to be closed to horned traffic for 21 days in December.

Construction on the Črnomelj-Vrbovsko railway began in 1939, but by 1940 it had come to a halt thanks to a worker dispute. Thanks to the outbreak of WWII, it was never finished.

On 19 June 1942, a group of 50 Partisans set up a blockade on the road in Vučnik, stopping traffic between Karlovac and Vrbovsko.

Vučnik was hit by the 2014 Dinaric ice storm.

== Demographics ==
As of 2021, there were only 2 inhabitants under the age of 20, both boys.

Village of Vučnik: Population trends 1857–2021
v

population										33	34	30	30	28	16	11	12
	1857	1869	1880	1890	1900	1910	1921	1931	1948	1953	1961	1971	1981	1991	2001	2011	2021

Note:Iskazuje se kao naselje od 1953. U 2001. povećano za dio naselja Dolenci i Nadvučnik u kojima je za navedeno razdoblje sadržan dio podataka. Sources: Croatian Bureau of Statistics publications

== Politics ==
As of its foundation on 3 March 2008, it belongs to the local committee of Lukovdol.

== Infrastructure ==
The water storage unit in Nadvučnik, with a capacity of 400 cubic metres (14,000 ft^{3}) at an elevation of 444 metres (1,457 ft), is also responsible for Lukovdol, Podvučnik, Vučnik, Gorenci and part of Draga Lukovdolska.

== Bibliography ==
- Korenčić, Mirko (1979). Naselja i stanovništvo Socijalističke Republike Hrvatske (1857–1971) [Villages and Population of the Socialist Republic of Croatia (1857–1971)]. Djela Jugoslavenske akademije znanosti i umjetnosti (in Serbo-Croatian). Vol. 54.
- Trgo, Fabijan, ed. (1964). Zbornik dokumenata i podataka o Narodno-oslobodilačkom ratu Jugoslovenskih naroda. Vol. V, 32.
- Banska vlast Banovine Hrvatske (1940d). "Socijalna zaštita radništva". Godišnjak banske vlasti Banovine Hrvatske (in Croatian). Vol. 1. pp. 229–241.
