= Međedi =

- Village
- Interactive map of Međedi
- Location within Croatia
- Coordinates: 45.429841°N 15.051684°E
- Country: Croatia
- County: Primorje-Gorski Kotar County
- City: Vrbovsko
- Community: Moravice

Area
  - Total: 1.5 km^{2} (0.58 sq mi)

Population (2021)
  - Total: 0
  - Density: 0.0/km^{2} (0.0/sq mi)
- Time zone: UTC+1 (CET)
  - Summer (DST): UTC+2 (CEST)
- Postal code: 51326
- Area code: +385 051

Međedi is a village in Croatia, under the Vrbovsko township, in Primorje-Gorski Kotar County.

== History ==
On 27 March 2021, a magnitude 2.1 earthquake occurred between Presika, Nadvučnik and Međedi.

== Demographics ==
In 1870, Međedi had 7 houses and 40 people.

In 1890, Međedi had 7 houses and 51 people. They attended the school in Dokmanovići. Administered and taxed by Komorske Moravice.

As of 2011, it was one of four uninhabited statistical villages in Vrbovsko, along with Lesci, Podvučnik and Radočaj. These were followed by Gornji Vukšići.

Village of Međedi: Population trends 1857–2021
v

population	42	40	44	51	44	29	31	24	33	30	17	27	1
	1857	1869	1880	1890	1900	1910	1921	1931	1948	1953	1961	1971	1981	1991	2001	2011	2021

Sources: Croatian Bureau of Statistics publications

=== Further reading ===
- Kraljevski zemaljski statistički ured (1903). Političko i sudbeno razdieljenje i Repertorij prebivališta Kraljevina Hrvatske i Slavonije po stanju od 1. travnja 1903. Zagreb: Kraljevska hrvatsko-slavonsko-dalmatinska zemaljska vlada, 🖶 Kraljevska zemaljska tiskara.
- Kraljevski zemaljski statistički ured (May 1913). "Repertorij prebivališta po županijama, upravnim kotarima, gradovima, upravnim i poreznim općinama". Političko i sudbeno razdjeljenje i Repertorij prebivališta Kraljevina Hrvatske i Slavonije po stanju od 1. siječnja 1913. Zagreb: Kraljevska hrvatsko-slavonsko-dalmatinska zemaljska vlada, 🖶 Kraljevska zemaljska tiskara. pp. 1–126. Page 32.

== Politics ==
As of its foundation on 3 March 2008, it belongs to the local committee of Moravice.

== Nature ==
In 1965, the "old yew" (Croatian: stara tisa) in Međedi, a female Taxus baccata individual dated to the 17th century, was protected by law in an act of the DZZP. At the time it was 15 metres (49 ft) tall. In 2016, it was found to have a girth of 105 centimetres (41 in) total girth, and an annual growth rate of 0.49 centimetres (0.19 in). It bears several lightning strike injuries.

The old yew lies along a hiking trail that goes through the village, Litorić-Topolovica-Međedi-Litorić.

== Bibliography ==
- Korenčić, Mirko (1979). Naselja i stanovništvo Socijalističke Republike Hrvatske (1857–1971) [Villages and Population of the Socialist Republic of Croatia (1857–1971)]. Djela Jugoslavenske akademije znanosti i umjetnosti (in Serbo-Croatian). Vol. 54.
