= Bellienus =

Freedman of ancient Rome

Bellienus or Billienus was a man of ancient Rome who lived in the 1st-century BCE. He was the son of a female slave and was himself originally a slave, born into the family and ownership of one "Demetrius". Virtually everything we know about Bellienus comes from an exchange of letters between the orators Cicero and Marcus Caelius Rufus.

In 49 BCE, he was stationed at Intemelium (modern Ventimiglia) with a garrison, where he was bribed by partisans of Pompey to put to death a locally respected nobleman named Domitius, a friend of Pompey's enemy Julius Caesar.

The enraged Intimilii took up arms in revolt, and Marcus Caelius Rufus had to march to the town with some cohorts, to put down the insurrection.

Some scholars have raised doubts about this anecdote, or at least about the name "Bellienus". Nineteenth-century German philologist Karl Friedrich Hermann thought it unlikely that a freedman would have a name that was a well-attested cognomen of an unrelated Roman family, that of the minor but still noble Belliena gens. Later scholars, such as Robert Yelverton Tyrrell, Louis Claude Purser, Theodor Mommsen, and Johan Cornelis Gerard Boot demurred on the grounds that "many cognomina were used as nomina at the time". D. R. Shackleton Bailey proposes that Hermann was correct and that Demetrius himself, Bellienus's former owner, could himself have been a freedman, and to have inherited a family name of Bellienus.
