= Nadvučnik =

Coordinates: 45°24′54″N 15°07′01″E

- Village
- Interactive map of Nadvučnik
- Country: Croatia
- County: Primorje-Gorski Kotar
- Municipality: Vrbovsko
- Community: Lukovdol

Area
  - Total: 8.4 km^{2} (3.2 sq mi)

Population (2021)
  - Total: 20
  - Density: 2.4/km^{2} (6.2/sq mi)
- Time zone: UTC+1 (CET)
  - Summer (DST): UTC+2 (CEST)

Nadvučnik is a village in Croatia. It is connected by the D3 highway.

== History ==
In 1860–1879, Matija Mažuranić wrote a 62 folio manuscript today titled Writings on the Building of Roads in Gorski Kotar and Lika (Croatian: Spisi o gradnji cesta u Gorskom Kotaru i Lici), today with signature HR-ZaNSK R 6424. A 21 folio manuscript dated 1872 titled Darstellung der Entstehung des Baues ... der Luisenstrasse together with a translation by I. Mikloušić is kept as HR-ZaNSK R 4572.

In 1864, a rinderpest outbreak in Bosanci and Kasuni caused the Lujzijana to be closed to horned traffic for 21 days in December.

Construction on the Črnomelj-Vrbovsko railway begun in 1939, but by 1940 it had come to a halt thanks to a worker dispute. Thanks to the outbreak of WWI, it was never finished.

Nadvučnik was hit by the 2014 Dinaric ice storm.

On 27 March 2021, a magnitude 2.1 earthquake occurred between Presika, Nadvučnik and Međedi.

== Demographics ==
As of 2021, there were only 3 inhabitants under the age of 20.

Village of Nadvučnik: Population trends 1857–2021
v

population	22	37	49	56	38	35	35	35	30	31	27	28	35	33	32	29	20
	1857	1869	1880	1890	1900	1910	1921	1931	1948	1953	1961	1971	1981	1991	2001	2011	2021

Note:In 2001 it was reduced by the area attach to the village of Vučnik, which includes part of its population from 1857 to 1991. Sources: Croatian Bureau of Statistics publications

In 1870, Nadvučnik, in Draga's porezna općina, had 7 houses and 37 people.

In 1890, Nadvučnik had 7 houses and 42 people. Gvozdac had 2 houses and 7 people. Lovnik had 1 house and 7 people. Its villagers were under Lukovdol parish and school districts, but were administered by Severin and taxed by Draga.

=== Further reading ===
- Kraljevski zemaljski statistički ured (1903). Političko i sudbeno razdieljenje i Repertorij prebivališta Kraljevina Hrvatske i Slavonije po stanju od 1. travnja 1903. Zagreb: Kraljevska hrvatsko-slavonsko-dalmatinska zemaljska vlada, 🖶 Kraljevska zemaljska tiskara.
- Kraljevski zemaljski statistički ured (May 1913). "Repertorij prebivališta po županijama, upravnim kotarima, gradovima, upravnim i poreznim općinama". Političko i sudbeno razdjeljenje i Repertorij prebivališta Kraljevina Hrvatske i Slavonije po stanju od 1. siječnja 1913. Zagreb: Kraljevska hrvatsko-slavonsko-dalmatinska zemaljska vlada, 🖶 Kraljevska zemaljska tiskara. pp. 1–126. Page 33.

== Politics ==
As of its foundation on 3 March 2008, it belongs to the local committee of Lukovdol.

== Infrastructure ==
The water storage unit in Nadvučnik, with a capacity of 400 cubic metres (14,000 ft^{3}) at an elevation of 444 metres (1,457 ft), is also responsible for Lukovdol, Podvučnik, Vučnik, Gorenci and part of Draga Lukovdolska.

== Gallery ==
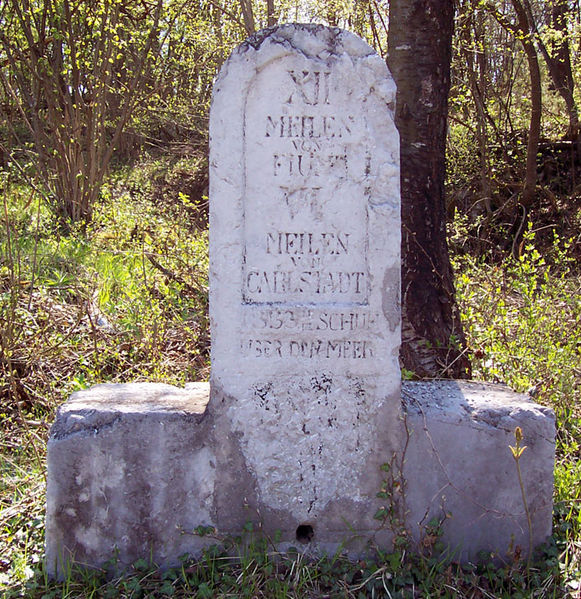
Milestone on the Lujzijana

== Bibliography ==
=== History ===
- Korenčić, Mirko (1979). Naselja i stanovništvo Socijalističke Republike Hrvatske (1857–1971) [Villages and Population of the Socialist Republic of Croatia (1857–1971)]. Djela Jugoslavenske akademije znanosti i umjetnosti (in Serbo-Croatian). Vol. 54.
- Banska vlast Banovine Hrvatske (1940d). "Socijalna zaštita radništva". Godišnjak banske vlasti Banovine Hrvatske (in Croatian). Vol. 1. pp. 229–241.
