= Rtić =

- Village
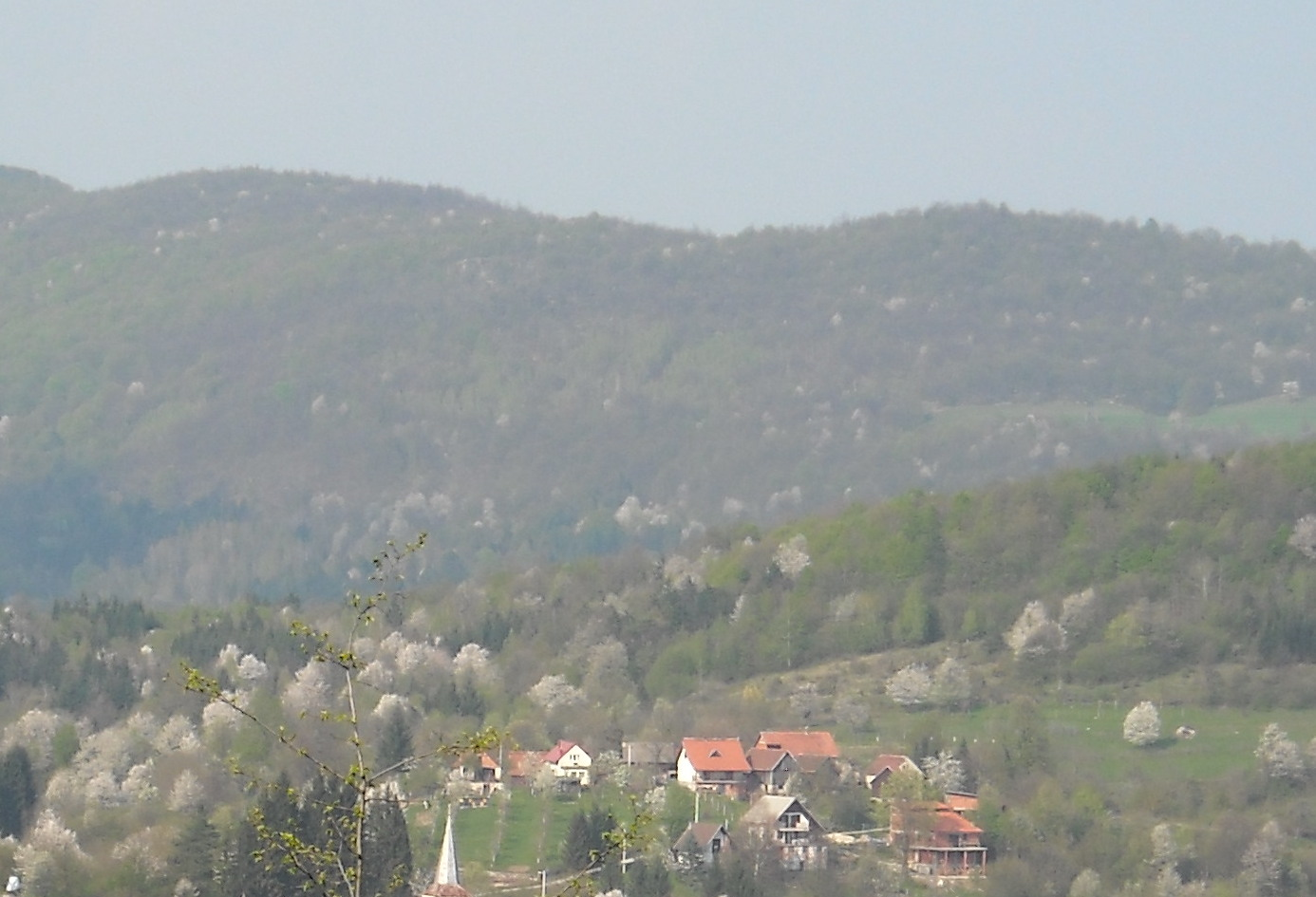
- Interactive map of Rtić
- Location within Croatia
- Coordinates: 45.430805°N 15.130184°E
- Country: Croatia
- County: Primorje-Gorski Kotar County
- City: Vrbovsko
- Community: Lukovdol

Area
  - Total: 1.8 km^{2} (0.69 sq mi)
- Elevation: 366 m (1,201 ft)

Population (2021)
  - Total: 7
  - Density: 3.9/km^{2} (10/sq mi)
- Time zone: UTC+1 (CET)
  - Summer (DST): UTC+2 (CEST)
- Postal code: 51326
- Area code: +385 051

Rtić is a village in Croatia, under the Vrbovsko township, in Primorje-Gorski Kotar County.

== History ==
Rtić was hit by the 2014 Dinaric ice storm.

== Demographics ==
As of 2021, there were no inhabitants under the age of 50.

Village of Rtić: Population trends 1857–2021
v

population	41	44	47	54	51	36	37	41	31	28	21	20	8	18	4	11	7
	1857	1869	1880	1890	1900	1910	1921	1931	1948	1953	1961	1971	1981	1991	2001	2011	2021

Note:"Ertić" until 1900. In 2001 it was reduced by the population of the area annexed by Lukovdol. Sources: Croatian Bureau of Statistics publications

In 1870, Ertić, in Lukovdol's porezna općina, had 5 houses and 44 people.

In 1890, Ertić had 8 houses and 54 people. Its villagers were under Lukovdol parish, school and tax districts, but were administered by Severin.

=== Further reading ===
- Kraljevski zemaljski statistički ured (1903). Političko i sudbeno razdieljenje i Repertorij prebivališta Kraljevina Hrvatske i Slavonije po stanju od 1. travnja 1903. Zagreb: Kraljevska hrvatsko-slavonsko-dalmatinska zemaljska vlada, 🖶 Kraljevska zemaljska tiskara.
- Kraljevski zemaljski statistički ured (May 1913). "Repertorij prebivališta po županijama, upravnim kotarima, gradovima, upravnim i poreznim općinama". Političko i sudbeno razdjeljenje i Repertorij prebivališta Kraljevina Hrvatske i Slavonije po stanju od 1. siječnja 1913. Zagreb: Kraljevska hrvatsko-slavonsko-dalmatinska zemaljska vlada, 🖶 Kraljevska zemaljska tiskara. pp. 1–126. Page 33.

== Politics ==
As of its foundation on 3 March 2008, it belongs to the local committee of Lukovdol.

== Sports ==
The "Gorski Kotar Bike Tour", held annually since 2012, sometimes goes through Rtić, such as in the first leg for 2024.

== Bibliography ==
=== Architecture ===
- Majer Jurišić, Krasanka; Krulić, Kristina; Škevin Mikulandra, Ana (2012). "Izgradnja i uređenja kapele sv. Franje Ksaverskog u Rtiću". Godišnjak zaštite spomenika kulture Hrvatske (in Croatian) (36) (published 2014-11-20). eISSN 2459-668X.

=== Demography ===
- Martinković (1854-04-10) [written 1854-03-14]. "Poziv od strane ureda c. kr. podžupani karlovačke nižepodpisani vojnoj dužnosti podvèrženi momci". Carsko kraljevske službene narodne novine (in Serbo-Croatian). Vol. 20, no. 82. p. 217. ISSN 1333-5243.
- Podžupan (1859-07-27) [written 1859-06-14]. "Poziv". Carsko kraljevske službene narodne novine (in Serbo-Croatian). Vol. 20, no. 170. pp. 433–434. ISSN 1333-5243.
- Korenčić, Mirko (1979). Naselja i stanovništvo Socijalističke Republike Hrvatske (1857–1971) [Villages and Population of the Socialist Republic of Croatia (1857–1971)]. Djela Jugoslavenske akademije znanosti i umjetnosti (in Serbo-Croatian). Vol. 54.
