= Gorenci, Vrbovsko =

Gorenci
- Village
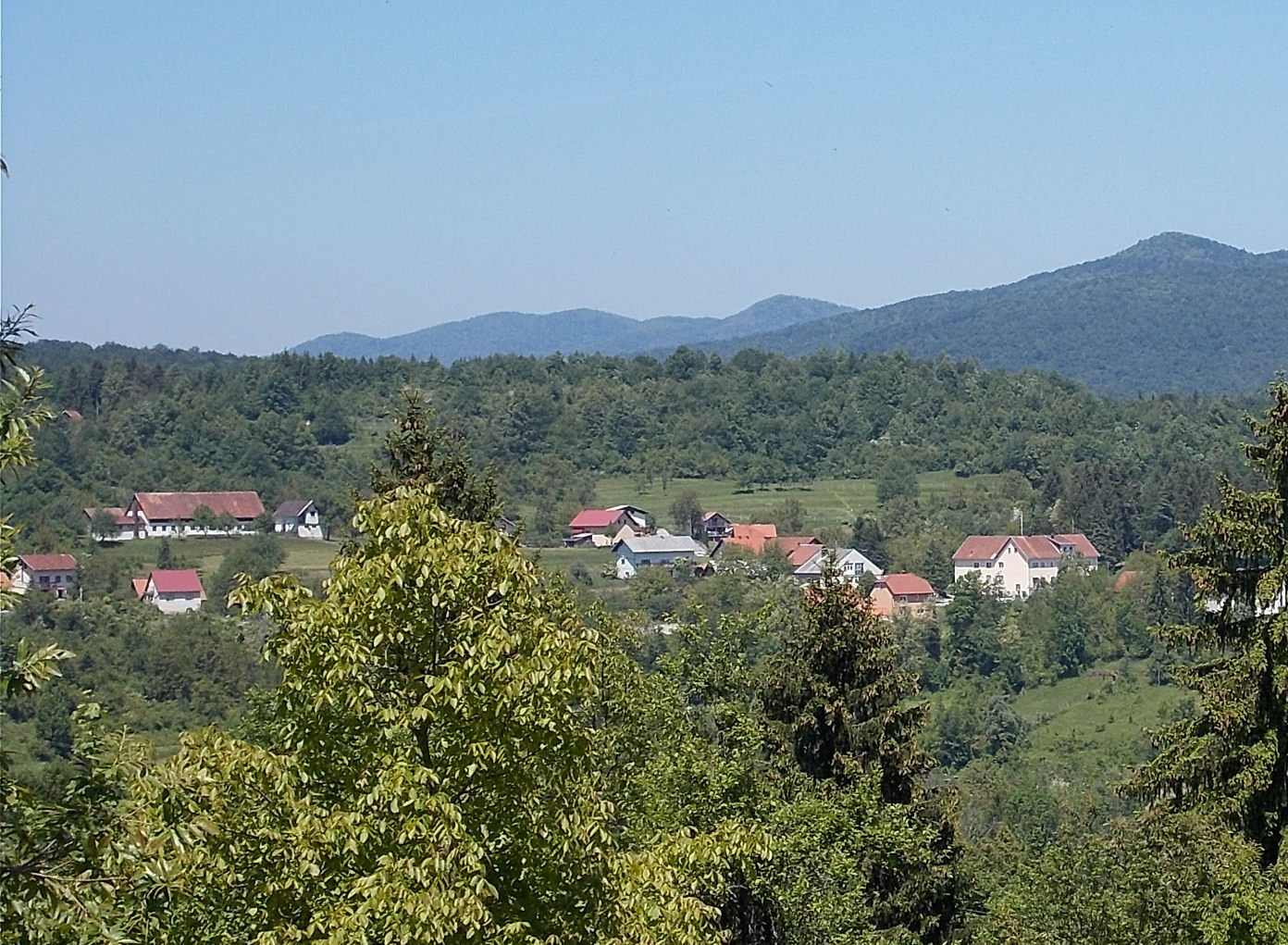
- Interactive map of Gorenci
- Location within Croatia
- Coordinates: 45.430925°N 15.119627°E
- Country: Croatia
- County: Primorje-Gorski Kotar County
- City: Vrbovsko
- Community: Lukovdol

Area
  - Total: 10 km^{2} (3.9 sq mi)
- Elevation: 384 m (1,260 ft)

Population (2021)
  - Total: 38
  - Density: 3.8/km^{2} (9.8/sq mi)
- Time zone: UTC+1 (CET)
  - Summer (DST): UTC+2 (CEST)
- Postal code: 51326
- Area code: +385 051

Gorenci is a village in Croatia, under the Vrbovsko township, in Primorje-Gorski Kotar County.

== Name ==
Gorenci is also the name of a village on the Donja Dobra, a village on Lake Ohrid and a village on the Black Drin, as well as a hamlet of Črnomerec, a hamlet of Kupinec. In addition to streets within the aforementioned, it is also the name of a street in Posavski Bregi.

== History ==
The Lukovdol-Plemenitaš road which passes through Gorenci was asphalted in 1981.

Gorenci was hit by the 2014 Dinaric ice storm.

== Demographics ==
As of 2021, there were only 5 inhabitants under the age of 20.

In 1828/1830, there were 34 residents in 5 families, all Catholic.

Village of Gorenci: Population trends 1857–2021
v

population	271	235	258	283	245	211	168	166	172	167	140	127	101	87	57	44	38
	1857	1869	1880	1890	1900	1910	1921	1931	1948	1953	1961	1971	1981	1991	2001	2011	2021

Note:Decreased in 2001 by the part of its territory attached to Lukovdol. Sources: Croatian Bureau of Statistics publications

In 1870, Gorenci, in Lukovdol's porezna općina, had 29 houses and 235 people.

In 1890, Gorenci had 47 houses and 283 people. Its villagers were under Lukovdol parish, school and tax districts, but were administered by Severin.

=== Further reading ===
- Kraljevski zemaljski statistički ured (1903). Političko i sudbeno razdieljenje i Repertorij prebivališta Kraljevina Hrvatske i Slavonije po stanju od 1. travnja 1903. Zagreb: Kraljevska hrvatsko-slavonsko-dalmatinska zemaljska vlada, 🖶 Kraljevska zemaljska tiskara.
- Kraljevski zemaljski statistički ured (May 1913). "Repertorij prebivališta po županijama, upravnim kotarima, gradovima, upravnim i poreznim općinama". Političko i sudbeno razdjeljenje i Repertorij prebivališta Kraljevina Hrvatske i Slavonije po stanju od 1. siječnja 1913. Zagreb: Kraljevska hrvatsko-slavonsko-dalmatinska zemaljska vlada, 🖶 Kraljevska zemaljska tiskara. pp. 1–126. Page 33.

== Politics ==
As of its foundation on 3 March 2008, it belongs to the local committee of Lukovdol.

== Attractions ==
Lukovdol has some rural tourism options, including the call-ahead Krizmanić restaurant, serving seasonal food from its garden in summer and goulash, sarma and coleslaw in winter.

== Sports ==
Beginning in 2013, the 7 stage 260 kilometres (160 mi) long Cycling Trail of Gorski Kotar (Croatian: Goranska biciklistička transverzala) passes through Gorenci.

== Infrastructure ==
The water storage unit in Nadvučnik, with a capacity of 400 cubic metres (14,000 ft^{3}) at an elevation of 444 metres (1,457 ft), is also responsible for Lukovdol, Podvučnik, Vučnik, Gorenci and part of Draga Lukovdolska.

== Notable people ==
Notable people that were born or lived in Gorenci include:

- Josip Kapš (18 March 1917 - 26 October 2006)

== Bibliography ==
- Žgela, Ivona (2023-09-11) [defended 2023-09-20]. Izazovi ruralnog turizma Gorskog kotara [Challenges of rural tourism in Gorski kotar] (Thesis) (in Serbo-Croatian). Rijeka: Sveučilište u Rijeci.
- Melem Hajdarović, Mihela (2023-06-14). "Glavačeva karta Hrvatske iz 1673. – njezini toponimi, geografski sadržaj i historijskogeografski kontekst" [Glavač’s map of Croatia from 1673: Its toponyms, geographical content, and historical-geographical context]. Studia lexicographica. 17 (32): 47–78. doi:10.33604/sl.17.32.2. eISSN 2459-5578.
- TZGK (2022). "Seoski turizam Krizmanić". Gorski Kotar - Neodoljiv (in Serbo-Croatian). Archived from the original on 2022-07-02.
- Krizmanić, Ivka (2021). "Seoski turizam Krizmanić". Visit Vrbovsko. Archived from the original on 2021-04-18.
- Vukadinović, Vanja (2021-04-16). "Gorski kotao nas vodi na Seoski turizam obitelji Krizmanić". Vilicom kroz Hrvatsku. Archived from the original on 2021-05-09.
