= Bogavići =

Bogavići Богавићи
- Village
- Location within Bosnia and Herzegovina
- Coordinates: 43°32′42″N 18°51′50″E
- Country: Bosnia and Herzegovina
- Entity: Republika Srpska
- Municipality: Foča
- Time zone: UTC+1 (CET)
  - Summer (DST): UTC+2 (CEST)

Bogavići (Serbian Cyrillic: Богавићи) is a village in the municipality of Foča, Republika Srpska, Bosnia and Herzegovina.
