= Beti Bricelj =

Slovene painter

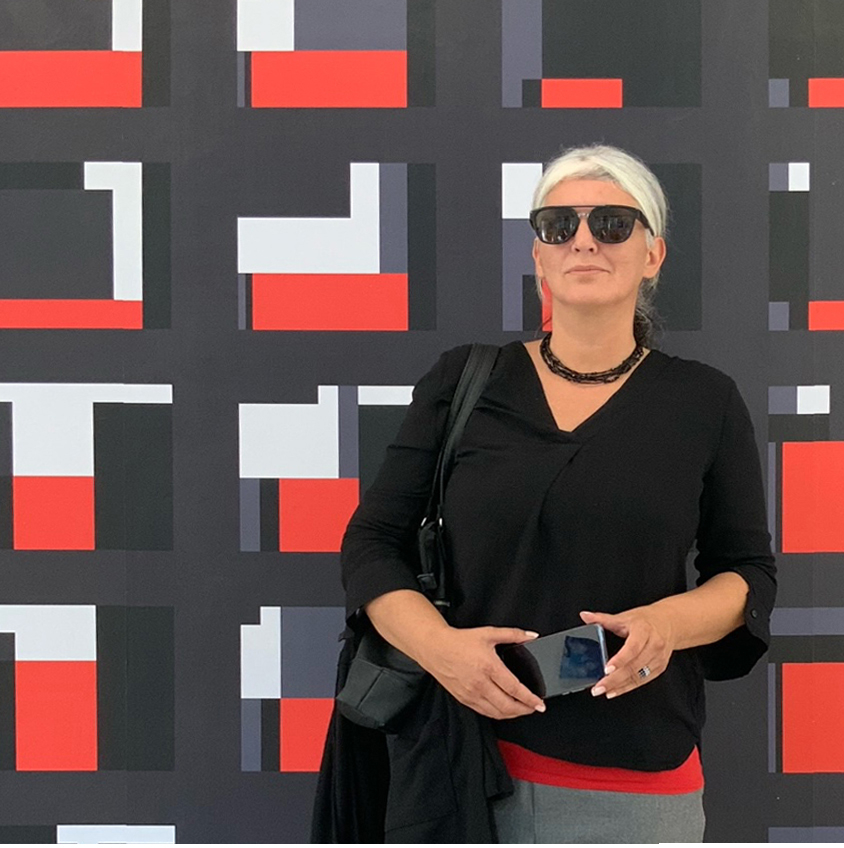
- Beti Bricelj
- Born: Beti Bricelj; March 26, 1974 (age 52); Postojna, SR Slovenia, SFR Yugoslavia
- Education: Arthouse – College of Visual Arts in Ljubljana (2000); Department of Aboriginal Affairs (South Australia)
- Known for: Painting

Beti Bricelj (born 26 March 1974) is a Slovene painter.

In 2000 she graduated from Fine Arts on Arthouse – College of Visual Arts in Ljubljana. After completing her studies, she continued her education in Australia where she lived for a year. Bricelj participated in a research study of the Aboriginal culture organized by the Department of Aboriginal Affairs, Adelaide, South Australia.

Bricelj has been invited to numerous Art Symposium, and has presented work for independent and joint exhibitions in Slovenia and abroad including the renowned Museum of Geometric and MADI Art in Dallas - Texas, United States. Her work is published in various international catalogues and books of contemporary art. As an artist she also took up an architectural challenge and designed the front of the Epicenter B2 Trade and Business Center in Postojna using her expertise in art.

Briceljs artwork is based on a grid that offers her an infinite number of possibilities. Within this framework, she explores the options of new serial paths, whereby deviating solutions, in particular, open up the most exciting perspectives for her.

She lives and works in Postojna.

== Awards and prizes ==
- 2010: Majdanpek (Serbia), International exhibition Art in miniature: Grand Prix
- 2013: Kranj (Slovenia), SREČANJA 2013 - International Fine Arts Festival Kranj-ZDSLU: RECOGNITION for HIGH_QUALITY ARTWORK
- 2016: Zaprešić (Croatia), Vršilnica, Novi Dvori: 19. International Miniatures Exhibition: Special Jury Mention
- 2017: Dallas, (Texas - United States), Museum of Geometric and MADI Art: 4th Biennial: Derivatives: Origins in Geometry: 3rd place
- 2018: Prijedor (BiH), Museum of Kozara: 2nd International Biennial of the Works on Paper : Special Jury Recognition
- 2022: Postojna (Slovenia), Municipality of Postojna: Recognition Miroslav Vilhar / for special achievement in the field of culture

== Memberships ==
- Since 2002 - member of the Slovenian Association of Fine Arts Societies.
- Since 2020 - member of international group The Drawing Collective.

== Selected solo and group exhibitions 2014–2026 ==
- 2014: Dallas (Texas - USA), The Museum of Geometric and MADI Art (Beti Bricelj, Israel Guevara and Jeff Robinson): From Slovenia, Venezuela and Dallas With Love
- 2014: Dallas (Texas - USA), The International on Turtle Creek in the Design District: 6th Annual GEOMETRIC GALA
- 2014: Murska Sobota (Slovenia), Gallery Murska Sobota: Naključja III.
- 2015: Majšperk (Slovenia), Art Factory: GEOMITRIJE
- 2015: Kranj (Slovenia), Layer House: Beti Bricelj – geoLom
- 2015: Umag (Croatia) Gallery Marin (Beti Bricelj / Đanino Božić)
- 2015: Ptuj (Slovenia),13. Art Stays – International Festival of Contemporary Art
- 2016: Ljubljana (Slovenia), ZDSLU Gallery: Beti Bricelj - Geo'ma
- 2016: Koper (Slovenia,) Gallery Loža: Beti Bricelj – Optično
- 2016: Delhi (India), National Gallery of Modern Art: SLOVENINDIA
- 2016: Kranj (Slovenia), 5th International Fine Arts Festival Kranj-ZDSLU
- 2016: Ljubljana (Slovenia), National Museum of Slovenia - Metelkova: May salon 2016
- 2016: Tel Aviv (Israel), Office in Tel Aviv Gallery: INTERSECTIONS Cultural Exchange Israel – Slovenia
- 2016: Skopje (North Macedonia), EU Center: The Magic of the Blue Mountain
- 2017: Dallas Texas (USA), The Museum of Geometric and MADI art: Derivatives: Origins in Geometry
- 2017: Izola (Slovenia), Insula Gallery: 30. Let Galerije Insula
- 2017: Vienna (Austria), Kro Art Contemporary: Heimat. Domovina. Patria 3
- 2017: Prijedor (BiH), Galerija 96: Pliva
- 2018: Izola (Slovenia), Insula Gallery: Beti Bricelj - Slike in objekti
- 2018: Thurso (Great Britain), Thurso Art Gallery (BIA) Three perspectives
- 2018: Paris (France), Galerie Abstract Project: Art Numérique 2
- 2018: Paris (France), 72nd Salon des Réalités Nouvelles, Parc Floral
- 2018: Kranj (Slovenia), Stolp Škrlovec: 7th International Fine Arts Festival: Geometry - Rationality of viewing
- 2018: Prijedor (BiH), Museum of Kozara: 2nd International biennial of Artworks on paper
- 2018: Nova Gorica (Slovenia), City Gallery Nova Gorica: Dela sodobnih slovenskih umetnic
- 2019: Celje (Slovenia) Gallery Kvartirna Hiša: Beti Bricelj - Dimenzija IV
- 2019: Budapest (Hungary), Három hét Galeria: Concrete Space 2
- 2019: Paris (France), 73rd Salon des Réalités Nouvelles, Parc Floral
- 2019: Budapest (Hungary), Három hét Galeria: Concrete Space 1
- 2019: Kranj (Slovenia), Stolp Škrlovec: 8th International Fine Arts Festival: Black and White
- 2019: Dallas (Texas, USA) The Museum of Geometric and MADI Art: 5th Biennial Origins in Geometry
- 2019: Bratislava (Slovakia) Gallery Umelka: Konkretne Leto – Contemporary European Geometrical Tendencies)
- 2019: Ljubljana (Slovenia), National Museum of Slovenia - Metelkova: Majski Salon ZDSLU - SLIKA
- 2019: Dallas Texas (USA), The Museum of Geometric and MADI Art: A FRESH LOOK: Selection of Women Artists in the MADI Collection
- 2019: Paris (France), Galerie Abstract Project: Art et Mathématique 2
- 2020: Ostrava (Czechia), Výstavní síň Sokolská 26: Beti Bricelj - D1M3N510N5
- 2020: Ostrowiec (Poland), BWA Gallery Ostrowiec: COVIMETRY
- 2020: Soest (Germany), RAUM SCHROT im Museum Wilhelm Morgner: MULTILAYER VISION 20/20
- 2020: Ljubljana (Slovenija), Equrna Gallery: ZELENI REZ
- 2020: Caen (France), Université De Caen Normandie: ART ET MATHÉMATIQUES
- 2021: Grenoble (France), De la ville de Pont de Claix, 6th Biennale Internationale d'art non—objectif: Que des femmes...
- 2021: Plüschow (Germany), Schloss Plüschow Museum Mecklenburgisches Künstlerhaus MULTILAYER VISION 20/20
- 2021: Ljubljana (Slovenija), Equrna Gallery: MODRO (Blue)
- 2021: New Haven (USA), Ely Center of Contemporary Art Covimetry (edition#2)
- 2021: Edinburgh (United Kingdom), Royal Scottish Academy: 195th RSA Annual Exhibition
- 2022: Vienna (Austria), ZS Galerie: Beti Bricelj - Abweichen von der Norm
- 2022: Dolní Vítkovici (Czechia), Galeria Gong: Czechoslovenia
- 2022: Zagreb (Croatia), Lauba : Art&Grad
- 2022: Köln (Germany), Galerie r8m: Schau Fenster Schau #7
- 2022: Gorizia (Italy), Cultural Centre Lojze Bratuž: Geometrija v umetnosti z zahoda
- 2022: Ptuj (Slovenia), 20. Art Stays – International Festival of Contemporary Art: Postproduction
- 2022: Koper (Slovenia), Libertas: 35. let Galerije Insula
- 2022: Maribor (Slovenia), Gallery Kibla Portal: Majski salon - Modra Črta
- 2022: Linz (Austria), Galerie Wuensch Aircube : Beti Bricelj
- 2022: Kostanjevica na Krki (Slovenia,) Galerija Božidar Jakac, Post-Production - from the Art Stays Festival Art Collection
- 2022: Mont-Saint-Aignan (France), Galerie LA Passerelle: Art & Mathématiques
- 2023: Paris (France), Galerie Abstract Project: Confluence of Lines
- 2023: Budapest (Hungary), Vasarely Museum: OSAS Plus No. 2
- 2023: Budapest (Hungary), Három hét Galeria: Budapest Contemporary Art Fair, Bálna
- 2023: Köln (Germany), Galerie r8m: Beti Bricelj – Squarerism
- 2023: Ptuj (Slovenia), 21. Art Stays International Festival of Contemporary Art - FO.VI Gallery – Postcards
- 2023: Ptuj (Slovenia), 21. Art Stays International Festival of Contemporary Art - Galerija Luna: Traveling with...
- 2023: Athens (Greece), Gallery 7: Line-Shape-Colour
- 2023: Trieste (Italy), Double Room: Piccole geometrie
- 2023: Paris (France), Galerie Abstract Project: Splitting the Square
- 2023: Poreč (Croatia), Galerija Zuccato: Geometrija u slovenskoj umetnosti
- 2023: Latina (Italy), Romberg Arte Contemporanea: Traveling with...
- 2023: Budapest (Hungary), Saxon Art Gallery: MADI Universe 77- miniMADImax
- 2023: Budapest (Hungary), Három hét Galeria: TIK-TAK
- 2024: Nova Gorica (Slovenia), City Gallery of Nova Gorica: Geodialogi
- 2024: Cologne (Germany), Galerie r8m: EDITIOON #3
- 2024: Budapest (Hungary), Akademia Galeria: Geometric art, MADI, Steam & Game
- 2024: Budapest (Hungary), 37 Gallery: Layering
- 2024: Wiligrad (Germany), Kunstverein SchlossČ Zeight Euch Konkret
- 2024: Novo mesto (Slovenia), Dolenjska Museum
- 2024: Izola (Slovenia), Insula Gallery: Game for two
- 2024: Budapest (Hungary), Vasarely Museum: Geometry Now
- 2024: Budapest (Hungary), Budapest Contemporary Art Fair PRESENTING MOMŰ / SZÖLLŐSI-NAGY – NEMES COLLECTION:“SMALL WORKS BY GREAT MASTERS"
- 2024: Ljubljana (Slovenia), Cukrarna Gallery: Extended vision
- 2024: Ptuj (Slovenia), Ptuj City Gallery: Structure of the Illusion
- 2025: Brussels (Belgium), Galerie r8m: Affordable Artfair
- 2025: Koper (Slovenia), Meduza Gallery: Primorske slikarke / Iz zbirk Obalnih galerij Piran
- 2025: Köln (Germany), Galerie Floss&Schultz: Layering
- 2025: Vienna (Austra), Sehsaal Gallery: Layering
- 2026: Cologne, Galerie r8m, with Wolfgang Berndt
