= Troha =

Troha is a surname from the Slovenian word for "scrap". Notable people with the surname include:

- Ivana Troha (born 1980), Croatian volleyball player
- Robert Troha (born 1977), Croatian basketball player
