= Šutej =

Šutej is a surname. Notable people with the surname include:

- Juraj Šutej (1889–1976), Croatian politician and Yugoslav finance minister
- Miroslav Šutej (1936–2005), Croatian painter and graphic artist
- Tina Šutej (born 1988), Slovene pole vaulter
- Vjekoslav Šutej (1951–2009), Croatian orchestral conductor
