= Bogojević =

Bogojević (Serbian Cyrillic: Богојевић; pl. Bogojevići, Богојевићи) is a Serbian surname. It derives from personal name Bogoje (Богоје), derived from the word bog meaning "God", with the possessive suffix -ev (Bogoje's). The suffix ić is a diminutive designation, or descendant designation. Thus the last name can be translated as Bogoje's son. It may refer to:

People

- Vladimir Bogojević, Serbian basketball player
- Milovan Bogojević, Serbian former basketball player and coach
- Bratislav Bogojević, Serbian former football player and manager
- Stanko Bogojević, Serbian former football player
- Drago Bogojević, Bosnian Serb former football player
- Ljiljana Bogojević, Croatian actress
- Radojko Bogojević, Serbian ambassador
- Nenad Bogojević "Bogi", Serbian guitarist
- Slavoljub Slava Bogojević, Serbian artist
- L. Bogojević, Serbian author
- Mirko Bogojević a.k.a. "Das Bo", German hip-hop artist part of Fünf Sterne deluxe-group
- Mirjana Bogojevic, Miss Germany 2001
- Andreas Bogojevic, Canadian politician
- Nikola Bogojevic, American professional wrestler

Placenames

- Bogojević Selo, in Trebinje municipality, Bosnia and Herzegovina
- Bogojevići, in Arilje municipality, Serbia
- Staniseljici -Bogojević selo, in Ljesanska Nahija, Montenegro

== See also ==
- Borojević
