= Ivan Goran Kovačić =

Croatian poet and writer (1913-1943)

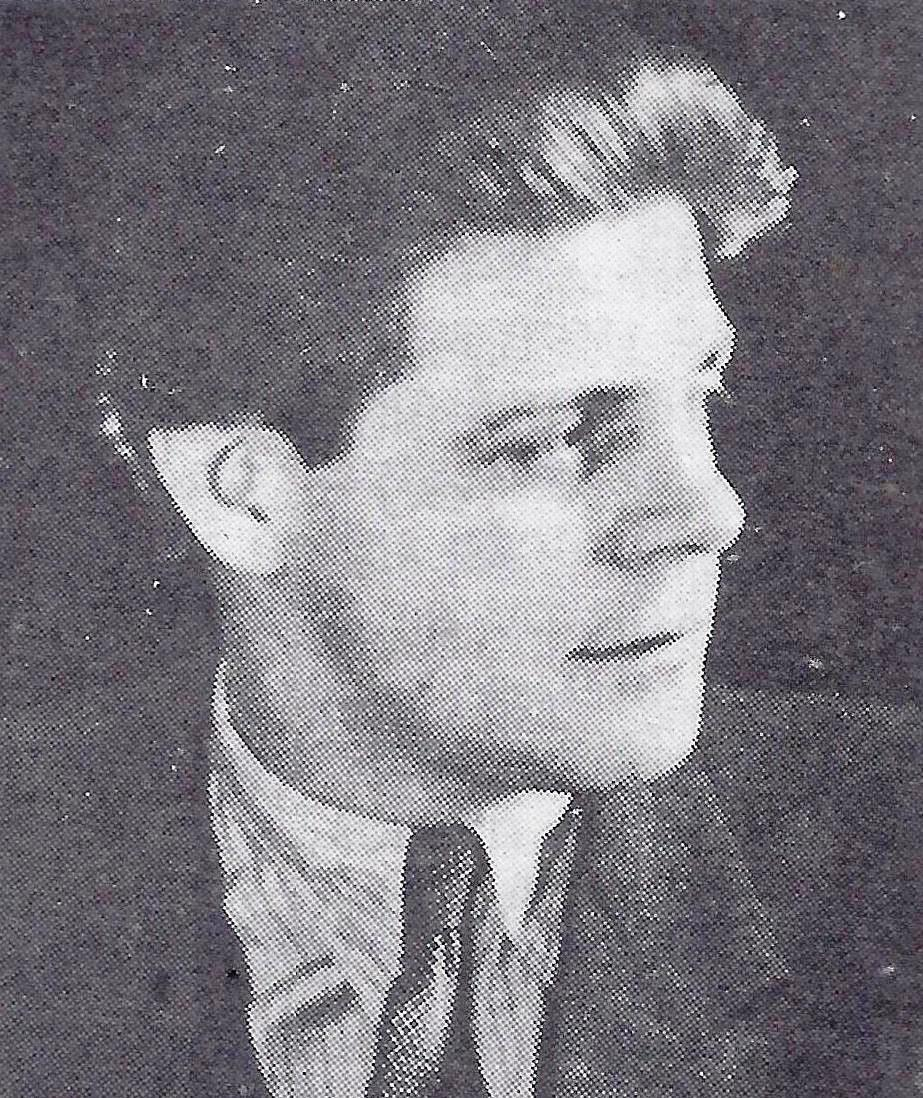
- Ivan Goran Kovačić
- Born: Ivan Kovačić; 21 March 1913; Lukovdol, Croatia-Slavonia, Austria-Hungary
- Died: 13 July 1943 (aged 30); Vrbnica, Independent State of Croatia
- Occupations: Writer, poet, soldier
- Writing career
- Pen name: Goran
- Genre: Poetry
- Notable work: Jama (The Pit)

Ivan Goran Kovačić (pronounced [ǐʋan ɡǒran kǒʋatʃitɕ]; 21 March 1913 – 13 July 1943) was a Croatian poet and writer.

== Early life and background ==
He was born in the town of Lukovdol, Vrbovsko municipality, in Gorski Kotar, to a Croat father, Ivan Kovačić, and Transylvanian Jewish mother Ruža (née Klein).

He attended the Gymnasium Karlovac. In his honour, the Karlovac city library, the city's oldest cultural institution founded in 1838, was renamed after him.

During World War II, in the harsh winter of 1942, Kovačić and Vladimir Nazor volunteered for the Partisan forces to set an anti-fascist example for the world. At that time, Goran was already ill with tuberculosis and Nazor was advanced in age, but they were motivated by their consciences. Kovačić was killed by Serbian Chetnik troops in an east-Bosnian village of Vrbica near Foča on 13 July 1943.

His death is described as follows: “Like in an ancient tragedy, the one who is most opposed to evil will most cruelly die from evil. The poet who raised his voice against the Croatian Ustaše massive killing and torturing of Serbian civilians (women and children mostly) had his throat cut by Serbian Chetniks….A few reliable witnesses confirm that Goran survived the hell of the fifth offensive, but when he returned to help his ill, left-behind, friend, Dr Simo Milošević, the fascists killed both the Croatian poet and the Serbian scholar without distinction. Fascism did not look on poets or scientists anywhere in the world as being of value.”

== Works ==
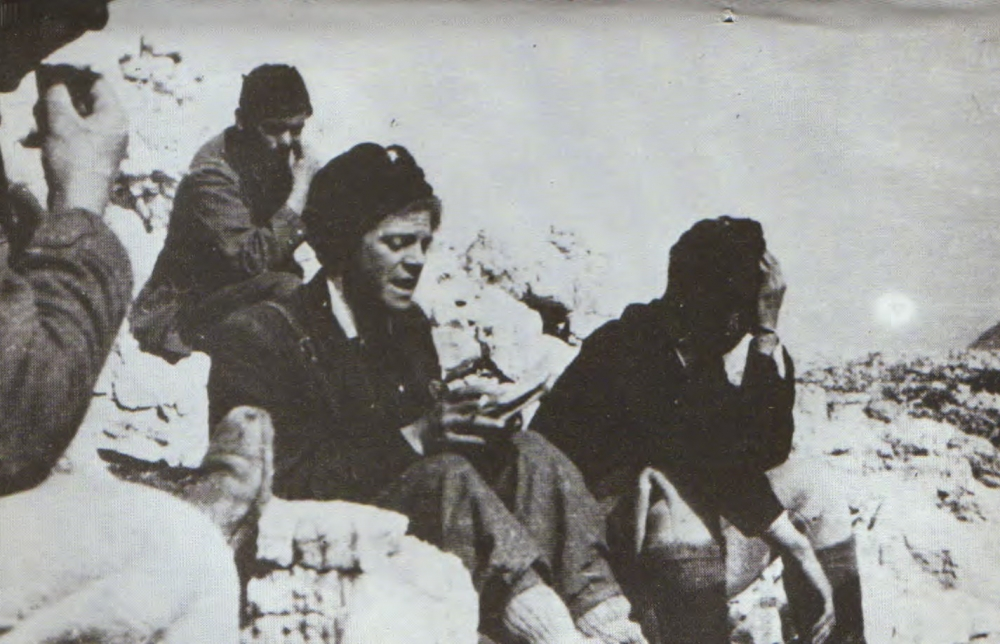
Ivan Goran Kovačić in partisans.

Death is a central theme in much of Kovačić's poetry, however this is not a reflection on his life outlook. His melancholy subjects came from outside events—such as his own and his brother's affliction with tuberculosis—rather than from an internal disposition toward the morose. Jure Kaštelan, one of Kovačić's contemporaries, expressed that Kovačić was inclined both toward romanticism and realism in his poetry, and that Kovačić had an intense perception of life.

His best known work is "Jama" ("The Pit"). He penned it during the war, while in service near the town of Livno. The poem was written out of intellectual and ethical responsibility that condemns atrocities and massacres done by the Croatian Ustaše. It has been described as a metaphor about the sufferer, martyr, and victim: “The sufferer is when a person without fault suffers. The martyr is when nonhumans torture a person. The victim is when the whips of injustice extinguish life. That is Goran’s metaphor. And his life.” His work is an example of anti-war poetry with messages against torture, mass murders and war crimes. "Jama" was studied in elementary schools throughout the Socialist Federal Republic of Yugoslavia.

=== "Jama" ===
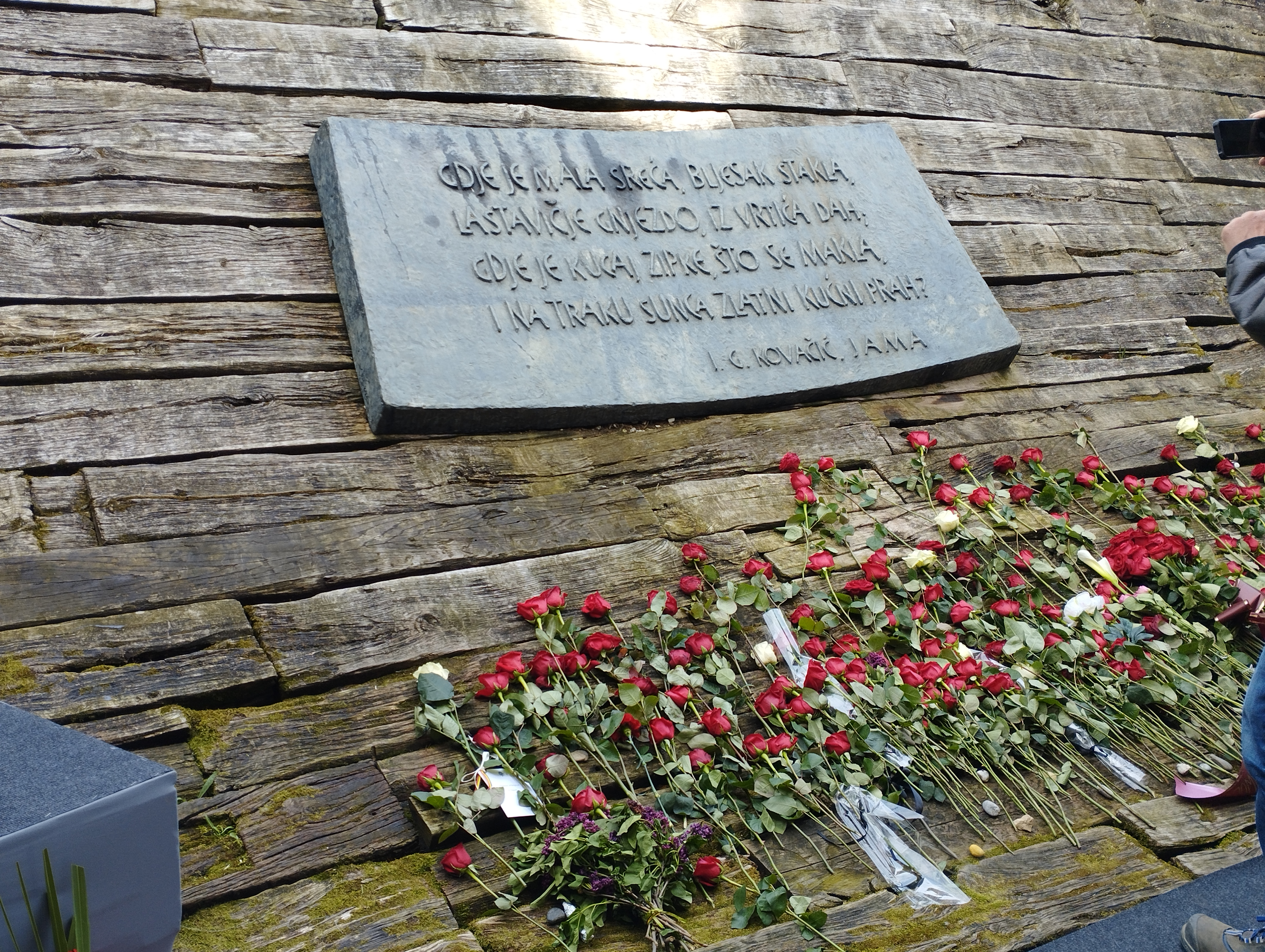
"Jama" at the Stone Flower at the Jasenovac concentration camp memorial area

The poem starts with a striking metaphor of blood replacing both light and darkness as victim's eyes were plucked out with a knife. That common torture was probably a mere sadism, since the victims were mass-murdered by Croatian Ustaše after that anyway:

Blood is my daylight and darkness too.
Blessing of night has been gouged from my cheeks
Bearing with it my more lucky sight.
Within those holes, for tears, fierce fire inflamed
The bleeding socket as if for brain a balm –
While my bright eyes died on my own palm

=== Other standard poetry ===
Other poetry written in Serbo-Croatian:

- O teško je četnik biti

=== Dialectal poetry ===
Ognji i rože (original manuscript)

His dialectal poems:

- Angeli su zišli (1930)
- Balada (1931)
- Beli most (1940)
- Bik
- Breskva
- Cirkva na bregu (1931)
- Črni oblaki (kaj su se)
- Črni oblaki (prnjàvi siromaki)
- Dar divana
- Drvarska popevka
- Drvlje
- Dva grozda
- D’žd, sonce i stari mlinar
- Gospocka ruka
- Harmonika (1931)
- I k meni je Nikola prišel (1930)
- Iz grožđa bo mošt (unpublished)
- Jeden je vumrl (1931)
- Kaj opet grmi?! (Ne ratujte…) (1931)
- Konj
- Konji i nebo
- Mak i ciklama (1931)
- Mala trgačica
- Mali oblak
- Mali pot
- Malin (1931)
- Martinova brada
- Moji spominki
- Na grobek sestrici mojoj (1930)
- Na Sesvete (1931)
- Očina kolajna
- Oni niso znali za Don Quijota*
- Petr Breški harmonikaš
- Petrica Kerempuh
- Popevka drobnoj dečici z grada (1930)
- Potok
- Prijatelj smrti
- Primorka
- Pripovetka o jelenu
- Proleče
- Puntar Grabancijaš
- Ribe
- Rodni kraj
- Senja (1931)
- Sestrin grob (1929)
- Slobodni sin
- Sonce i seljak
- Srčecu mojem (1930)
- Sreča
- Starinska klet (1931)
- Trgatva
- Tuna Rog
- V nedelu na večer (1931)
- V noći (1931)
- V protuletje (Protuletje je tu) (1931)
- V protuletje (Z jabuk su padale) (1931)
- Valcer
- Vesela cerkva
- Vino
- Vumrl je starček
- Vuzmena noć (1931)
- Zadnji glasi (1929)
- Zakaj? (1931)
Dar divana (original)

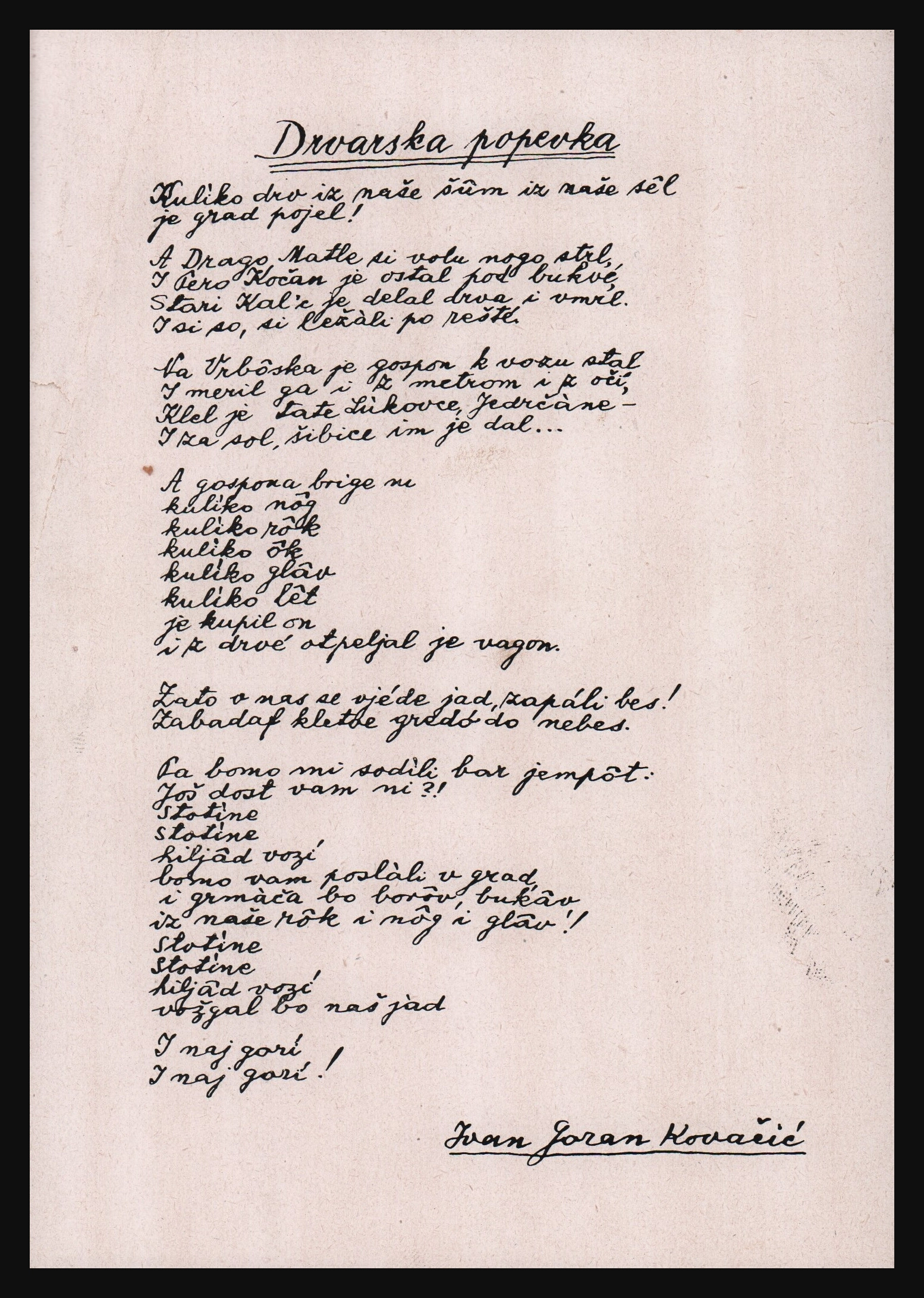
Drvarska popevka (original)

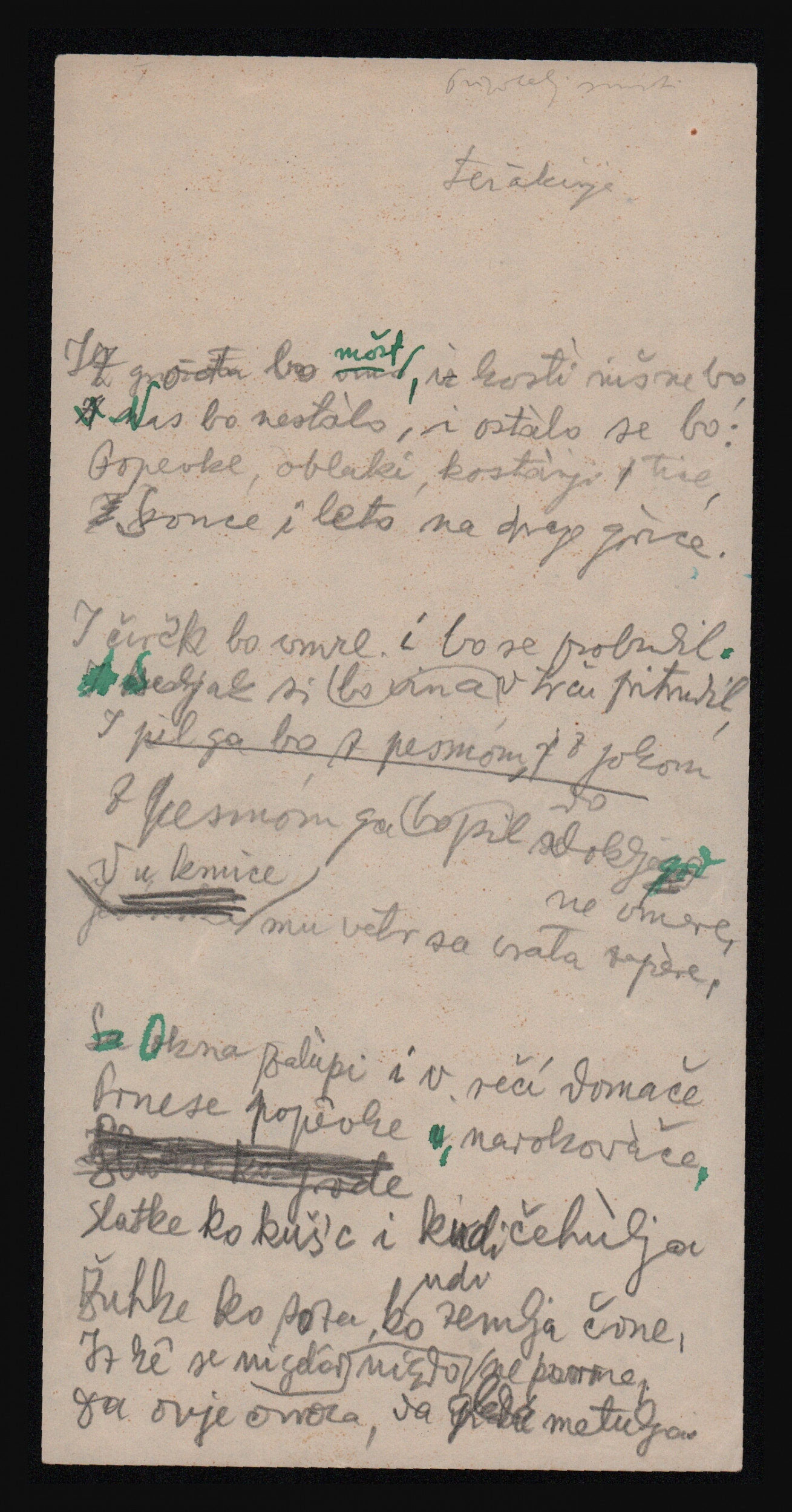
Iz grožđa bo mošt (original, unpublished)

Sreča (original)

Oni niso znali (original)

== In culture ==
- Paul Éluard wrote a poem called The grave of Goran Kovačić.
- A Yugoslavian film Ivan Goran Kovačić, was made in 1979, written and directed by Ljubiša Ristić. Croatian actor Rade Šerbedžija portrayed Kovačić.
- The band Warnament recorded a song titled "Hollow Of The Innocent Victims" inspired by the poem "Jama"
- Branko Miljković's poem "Goran" is dedicated to Ivan Goran Kovačić.
- Dragutin Tadijanović's poem "Goran's Epitaph" (1945) is dedicated to Ivan Goran Kovačić.
- Živko Anočić portrayed the poet in Narodni heroj Ljiljan Vidić, receiving critical acclaim

== Bibliography ==
- Kovačić, Ivan Goran (1945). Tadijanović, Dragutin (ed.). Ognji i rože (1st ed.). Zagreb.
- — (1949). Prvi koraci. Zagreb.
- Kuzmanović, Mladen (1975). "Antologija novije kajkavske lirike". Kaj. 8 (3–5). ISSN 0453-1116.
- Klaić, Bratoljub (1975). "Rječnik". Ivan Goran Kovačić: Novele, pjesme, eseji, kritike i feljtoni. pp. 285–295.
- Petrač, Božidar (1993-12-31). "Umjetnička i politička osjetljivost Ivana Gorana Kovačića" (PDF). Hrvatski vojnik. Vol. 3, no. 54. pp. 22–29. ISSN 1333-9036.
