= Mirko Bogović =

Croatian poet and politician (1816-1893)

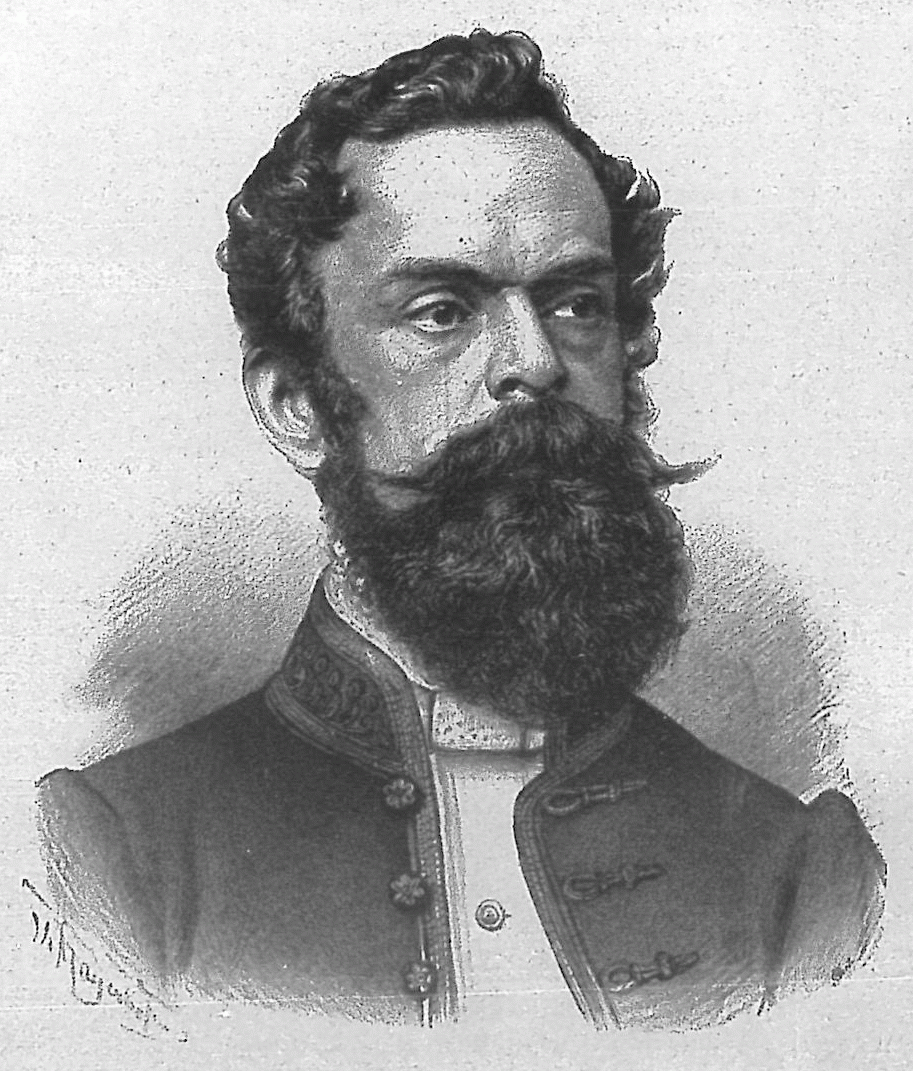
- Born: 2 February 1816; Varaždin, Kingdom of Croatia, Austrian Empire (now Varaždin, Croatia)
- Died: 4 May 1893 (aged 77); Zagreb, Kingdom of Croatia-Slavonia, Austria-Hungary (now Zagreb, Croatia)
- Occupations: poet, politician

Mirko Bogović (2 February 1816 – 4 May 1893) was a Croatian poet and politician.

He graduated in philosophy in Szombathely in 1830, cadet school in Petrovaradin (1833–1837) and law in Pest in 1844.

He wrote satirical poems incorporating romance, politics and patriotism as subjects. During the autocracy of von Bach in the 1850s, Bogović was the central person of Croatian literature in the Austrian Empire; as one of the founders of the Croatian novella ("Pripovijesti"). In 1867 he was the Grand Perfect of the Zagreb County while in period between 1871 and 1875 he served as the ministerial adviser in Budapest. While his work was voluminous and prominent during his lifetime, it was subsequently often regarded as mediocre by literary critics.

== Sources ==
- Bogdanović, Tomislav; Sokač Bogdanović, Josipa (2016). "Mirko Bogović (1816.-1893.) – osvrt na život i djelo" [An Account of the Life and Work of Mirko Bogović (1816 – 1893)] (PDF). Cris (in Croatian). XVIII (1). Historical Society of Križevci: 5–17.
