= Borojevići, Bosnia and Herzegovina =

Borojevići
- Village
- Interactive map of Borojevići
- Location within Bosnia and Herzegovina
- Coordinates: 43.1024501°N 17.888763°E
- Country: Bosnia and Herzegovina
- Entity: Federation of Bosnia and Herzegovina
- Canton: Herzegovina-Neretva
- Municipality: Stolac

Area
  - Total: 3.32 sq mi (8.59 km^{2})

Population (2013)
  - Total: 601
  - Density: 181/sq mi (70.0/km^{2})
- Time zone: UTC+1 (CET)
  - Summer (DST): UTC+2 (CEST)

Borojevići is a village in the municipality of Stolac, Bosnia and Herzegovina.

== Demographics ==
According to the 2013 census, its population was 601.

Ethnicity in 2013
| Ethnicity | Number | Percentage |
|---|---|---|
| Bosniaks | 352 | 58.6% |
| Croats | 248 | 41.3% |
| other/undeclared | 1 | 0.2% |
| Total | 601 | 100% |
