= Blaževci, Croatia =

Blaževci
- Village
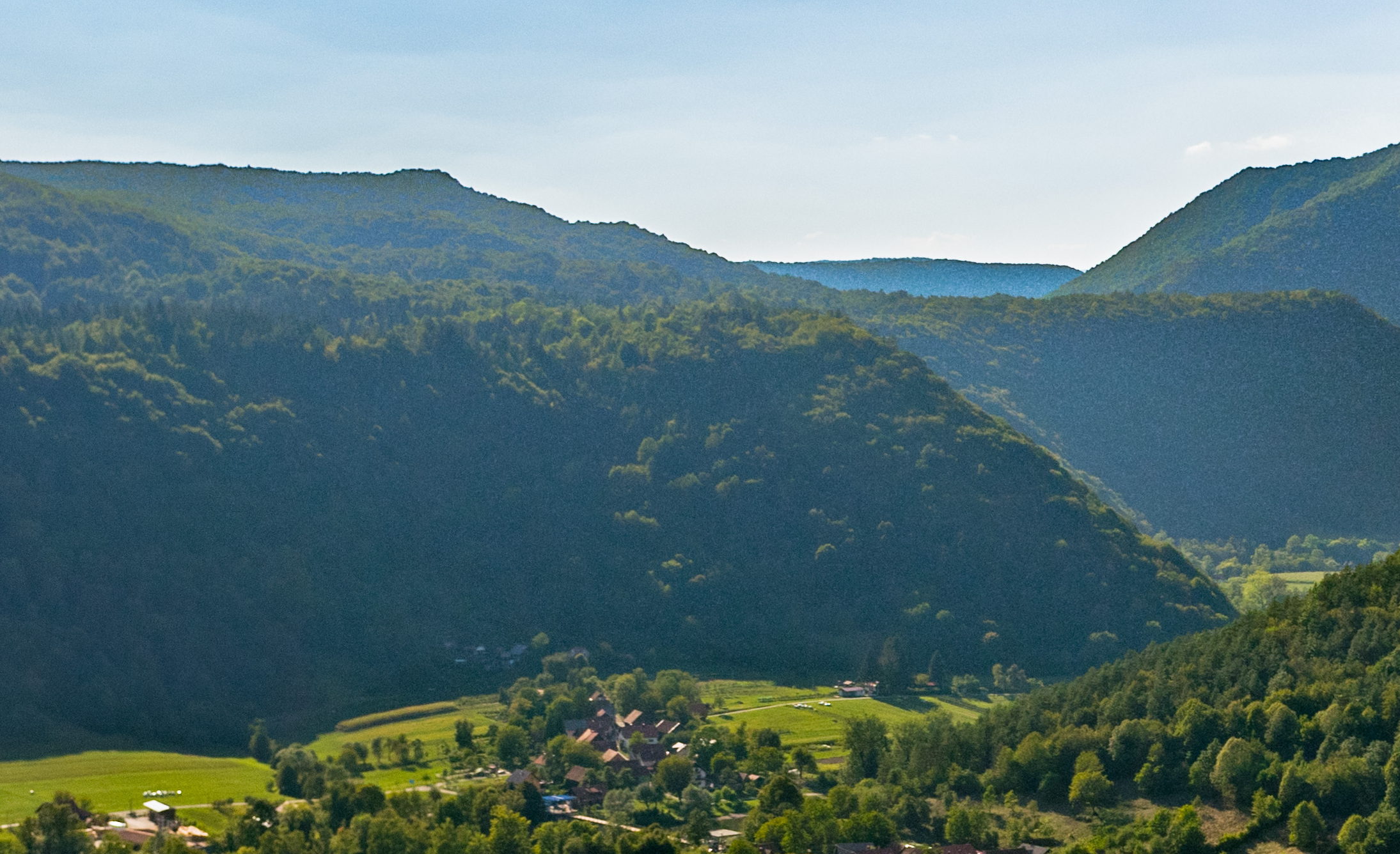
- Interactive map of Blaževci
- Location within Croatia
- Coordinates: 45.4842°N 15.0722°E
- Country: Croatia
- County: Primorje-Gorski Kotar County
- City: Vrbovsko
- Community: Plemenitaš

Area
  - Total: 5.7 km^{2} (2.2 sq mi)
- Elevation: 190 m (620 ft)

Population (2021)
  - Total: 34
  - Density: 6.0/km^{2} (15/sq mi)
- Time zone: UTC+1 (CET)
  - Summer (DST): UTC+2 (CEST)
- Postal code: 51326
- Area code: +385 051

Blaževci is a village in Croatia, under the Vrbovsko township, in Primorje-Gorski Kotar County. Geographically, it is in the Kupa canyon, in a series of arable fields running from Dol to Dolenji Radenci biscted by the river Kupa. Ecclesiastically, it belongs to the Plemenitaš parish. It is regionally important for its border crossing with Slovenia, and for one of the last functional sawmills on the river. Tourism mostly focuses on rafting and kayaking, although a smaller percentage of visitors come for the nearby scenic viewpoints of Orlova stijena and Sodevska stena, or to climb one of the nearby mountains.

== Name ==
Blaževci is also the name of a village in the Usora watershed, a hamlet in Lika, and a historical village near Vrbica in Slavonia destroyed in the 19th century.

== Geography ==
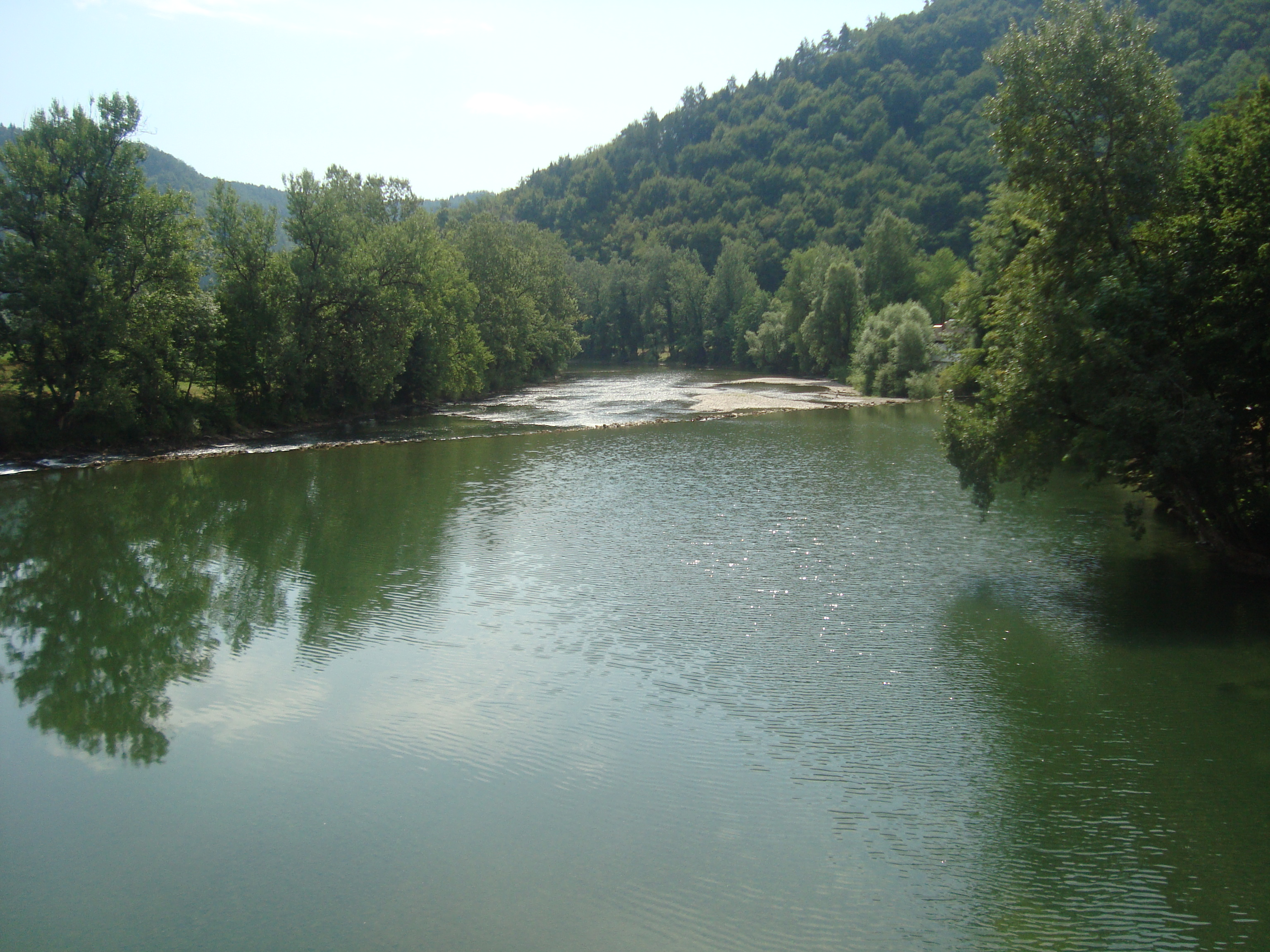
Kupa at Blaževci

Blaževci was built on the 0.220 square kilometres (0.085 mi^{2}) alluvial field Blaževačko polje, with a 1.3 kilometres (0.81 mi) long riverbank. It is the largest field by area on the right bank of the Kupa between Čedanjsko polje 21 kilometres (13 mi) upstream and Damaljsko polje 12 kilometres (7.5 mi) downstream. Blaževačko polje is part of a connected series of fields running from Dol to Dolenji Radenci, the largest of which is Sodevačko polje on the opposite bank.

Most of these fields have a spring and a stream running through them, and Blaževačko polje shares with Dolsko polje and the much smaller Ločko polje the trait of being bisected by its stream. The stream, Potok blaževački, is 394 metres (1,293 ft) long, originating in a spring with no name other than Vrelo "spring" at an elevation of 186.0 metres (610.2 ft) (185.9 metres (610 ft) in the dry season), only about 3 metres (9.8 ft) above the Kupa itself. It is 2–5 metres (6.6–16.4 ft) wide, and although it is marked as constant by the DRSV and the 1968 topographic map, it does dry up during summer drought. Vrelo is only a 1.5 kilometres (0.93 mi) walk upstream to the Žlebac spring in Štefanci, and a less than 0.7 kilometres (0.43 mi) walk downstream to the Izvor spring in Zapeć, with a usually dry spring 0.2 kilometres (0.12 mi) closer than Izvor.

As a result of past meandering and other processes the canyon's edge forms a bight around the Blaževačko polje, about 1.4 kilometres (0.87 mi) of which is the rim of a doline-ridden karst plateau. The slope from the edge of the plateau to the rim of the field is about 80% with little variation, so there is no natural moderately inclined path up. Instead, hairpin turns are used, and all paths up, both historical and present, go through a single hairpin turn (45.4845°N 15.0677°E). At the rim of the plateau there are two small hills overlooking Blaževci: one with elevation 385.8 metres (1,266 ft) at 45.4786°N 15.0750°E, and △ 142 with elevation 376.9 metres (1,237 ft) at 45.4800°N 15.0708°E. From the plateau's rim, the roads and paths lead towards Razdrto, Plemenitaš, and the mountain Litorić (877.8 metres (2,880 ft)), hidden from view on most of Blaževačko polje by the Kupa canyon unlike some of the mountains on the opposite side, such as Kozice.

South of the village towards Zapeć at the base of a cliff simply called Stena "cliff", is the cave that gave the latter village its name.

== Architecture ==
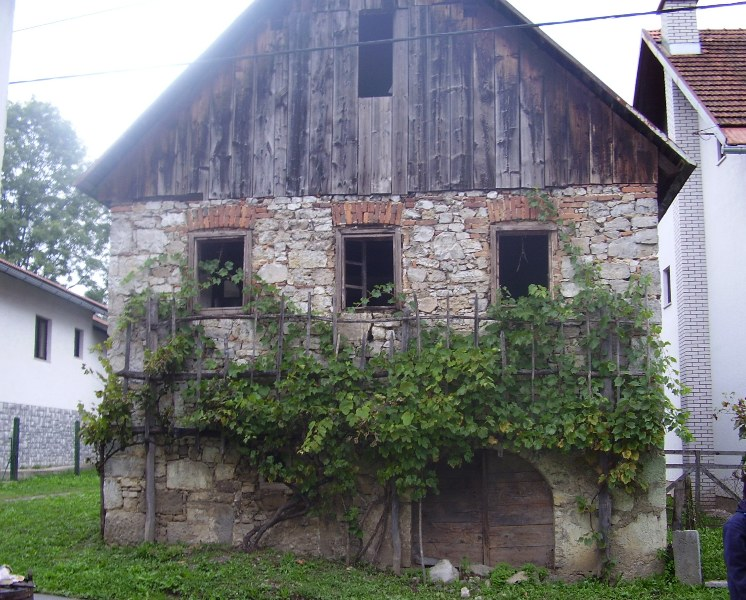
Typical house in Blaževci

There is a bridge from Blaževci to Sodevci, the last upstream until Brod and the last downstream until Pribanjci, although the river can also be crossed on foot at numerous weirs in between.

There is a small chapel (45.4842°N 15.0724°E) dedicated to Saint John the Baptist in the town. It was built in the 19th century and has been renovated recently.

Beginning in 1978, a project to renovate and preserve the village has taken place within the scope of the Raziskave in fiksiranja stanja etnoloških spomenikov project, including survey work. In 1986, a study on the preventive protection of the village was conducted. As part of a valorisation project for the entire Kupa valley, an evaluation of houses was conducted in 2000 and 2001:

1. House 21 (45.4843°N 15.0719°E). A single storey house belonging to Ivan Ferderber as of 2000, and before him to the Valentič family, originally without a chimney. As one of the more interesting houses in the town, it was sketched in detail by Zdravko Živković on behalf of the Ministry of Culture in 2000.
2. Muhvić House. The house of Marko Muhvić was built in 1829 according to its inscription. Includes a stone portal.
3. House 16 (45.4844°N 15.0725°E). Erected in 1835 according to its inscription. This large house was originally used as a threshing floor but repurposed as a residence. Houses written archival material from the beginning of the 20th century, including a deed from 1915.
4. Zelo House (ruins). Erected in 1840 by J. M. Zelo, according to its inscription. Belonged to the smith Josip Matejić, deceased by 2000, and inherited by Anka Mihalić (b. 1931). Includes a stone portal.
5. House of Slavko Kranjc, deceased. The date 1868 is carved into its wood.
6. House of Slavko Medved. The date 1880 is carved into its wood.
7. House 7 (45.4843°N 15.0729°E). An old house owned by Petar Štajnminger.
8. House 9 (45.4843°N 15.0727°E). Owned by Anđelka Mihelić-Štefanac, built in 1929 when her father returned from America. Alojz Augustin was the carpenter for the door. Next to the house, the remains of an older construction can be seen, which in her great-grandfather's time was used as a sheep pen.
9. House 4/3. Built on uneven terrain. A stone house originally with a shingled roof.
10. House 19 (45.4843°N 15.0721°E). A unique house owned by Ivan Lilek.

There is an old stone portal in the house of Ivan Mihelić. Some of the stone entrances in Blaževci are the work of stonemasons from Male Drage, whose craft has gone extinct there.

There is also a brewery on the road.

== History ==
=== Early ===
With the Turkish invasion, the region was left nearly uninhabited in from the end of the 15th century through the 16th century, repopulation beginning at the end of the 16th century and in the 17th century, mostly for the purpose of supplying the Military Frontier, although Blaževci would eventually end up within Civil Croatia in the 19th century. In the 18th century, the Kajkavian speaking local population began to make their way across the Kupa again.

On 28 June 1774, lord Mihal Mikulić of Severin on behalf of count Krsto II Oršić drew up in Severin a list of duties of freedmen and serfs in Razdrto, Štefanci, Blaževci, Zapeć, Plemenitaš and Košac. It was signed by judge Mihalj Barić of Blaževci. The villagers of Blaževci were serfs. The original survives in the HDA in Zagreb, survives in the HDA, and was published by Rudolf Strohal.

The first cadastre of the area was drawn up in 1862.

Intermarriages across the Kupa were not uncommon historically, with such marriages taking place on the territory of Plemenitaš in 1870 (with Dol), 1871 (Sodevci), 1876 (Stari Trg), 1879 (Srednji Radenci), 1881 (Sodevci), 1890 (Jelenja Vas), 1901 twice (Podgrad, Stari Laz), 1904 (Dalnje Njive), 1905 (Sodevci), 1909 (Radenci, 1912 (Radenci), 1913 (Vimolj, 1919 (Predgrad), 1921 (Hrib), 1922 (Sinji Vrh), 1923 (Sodevci), 1931 (Stari Trg) and some cases after 1945. Before 1911, most were women from Blaževci with the exception of the 1870, 1890 and one of the 1901 marriages; after 1911, all were men from Blaževci. The most common were intermarriages with Sodevci natives. Of the villages in Plemenitaš parish, cross-river marriages were most common in Blaževci.

Many Blaževci residents participated in the formation of the Stari Trg Volunteer Fire Department (Slovene: Prostovoljno gasilsko društvo Stari Trg ob Kolpi). The Stari Trg ob Kolpi Volunteer Fire Department was founded on 2 February 1894, with 58 members by the end of that summer.

In 1915, Ana Jakovac of Blaževci, by that time living in Houghton, Michigan, sold her House 13 to Jure Mihelić (b. 14 April 1843) of House 21.

The sawmill of Ivan Kapš in Blaževci (45.4830°N 15.0760°E) was the first in the Kupa valley, built in 1921.

In 1937, the Volunteer Fire Department (Croatian: Dobrovoljno vatrogasno društvo) of Blaževci-Plemenitaš was founded, today under the VZ grada Vrbovsko. Its current commander is Robert Matjašec.

Blaževci was electrified in 1954, from Slovenia.

Blaževci received its first asphalted road in 1968. The Blaževci-Plemenitaš road was asphalted in 1986.

The river used to be crossed by ferry. from a wooden dock just upstream from the current bridge. The last ferryman was Ivan Mihelić Pek, who served a long time in that role. The bridge was built by the JNA in 1981, financed by the municipalities of Kočevje, Črnomelj, Delnice and Vrbovsko, on land owned by Kapš, the sawmill owner. It was initially christened Partizanski most. Goršeti had been proposed as a bridge location, but Goršeti was given the choice between a bridge or a school, and they chose the school (now in ruins). The school was built with stones carried by workers on their shoulders from the Slovene side of the river. The road from Štefanci to Goršeti was built by the Šumarija Vrbovsko while felling Ostrya carpinifolia for axles and wheels.

The telephone lines were installed in 1981/1982 from Dol in Slovenia, so Blaževci ended up with a Ljubljana number along with Zapeć and Plemenitaš, contrasting with the rest of Vrbovsko municipality. Before the installation of telephone lines, one had to place a call at the telephone in the post office of Stari Trg.

Before the Breakup of Yugoslavia, the two sides of the river were well-connected. Pigs were purchased at the fair in Črnomelj, as well as more frequently to the fairs in Stari Trg, Predgrad, Bosiljevo, and sometimes Vinica. Villagers from Sodevci and Blaževci would bathe in the river together and then bicycle to Zdihovo, which at the time had many restaurants. A joke existed, "In Croatia, lamb on a spit turns; in Slovenia, cement mixers." (Note: "U Hrvatskoj se okreću odojci i janjci, a kod nas okreće miješalica za beton.") The postal address was officially in Lukovdol, but in practice in Stari Trg. Primary education was typically in Stari Trg, because it was nearer than the schools in Plemenitaš and Lukovdol. Secondary education was often in Črnomelj, Novo Mesto and Ljubljana, besides in Croatia.

=== Border era ===
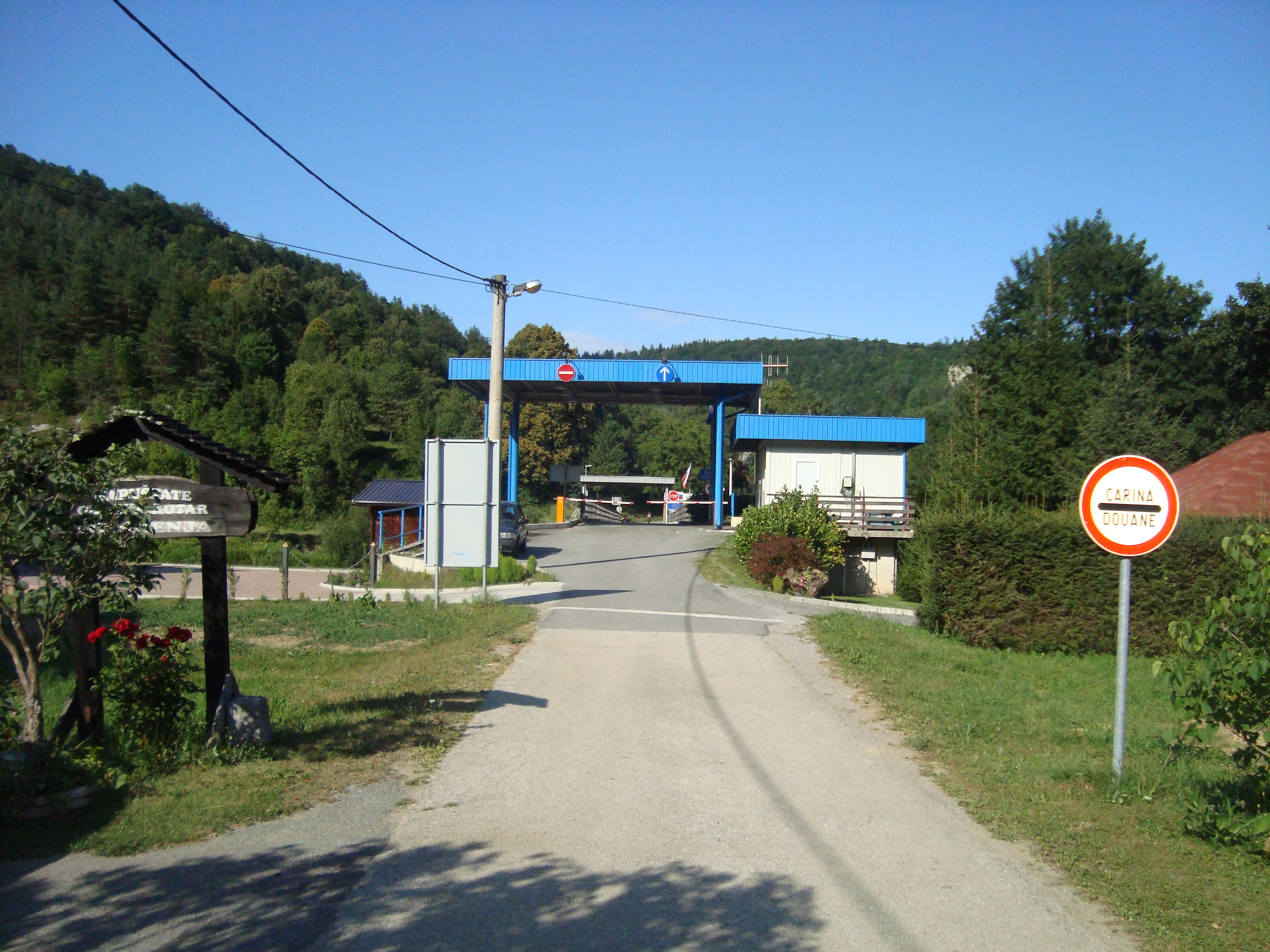
Border crossing with Slovenia at Blaževci

For several years beginning in 1991, the bridge was not a border crossing yet, and so it took a 50 kilometres (31 mi) trip to cross over to Slovenia legally, although many simply walked across the weirs illegally to avoid the long distance. The new border was especially odious for those employed across the border. There was a 45,000 tolar fine for illegal border crossing. Soon, a border crossing permit allowed individuals that received one to cross at Blaževci, but many could not obtain those papers. A police station was set up on the bridge, but it was closed between 23:00 and 6:00, sometimes making the long way around necessary when returning.

As of 2000, the watermill in Blaževci was in ruins and there were no more millers. Despite the high cost, grain is still milled at the mills in Metlika, Jurovski Brod and Brod pri Ozlju, and the flour transported to Črnomelj.

The water supply of Blaževci was supposed to come through Sodevci per a 1984 agreement, but that did not work out, so they remained without tap water until it came through Croatia in 2004.

In 2005, Blaževci and Štefanci were hit with severe flooding.

For over a month beginning in mid-September 2011, Blaževci and several other remaining analog islands lost their television signal, though only from the Croatian side (Slovene channels were still available).

During a 2012 veteran's commemoration of Operation Storm in Blaževci, the then former Slovene prime minister Borut Pahor and a Slovene team beat the Croatian team 2:0.

In On 5 July 2013, residents from throughout Vrbovsko township celebrated the accession of Croatia to the EU on the bridge between Blaževci and Sodevci, but Croatia would not be accepted into the Schengen Area until 1 January 2023.

Blaževci was hit by the 2014 Dinaric ice storm.

In response to the European migrant crisis, the Slovenian border barrier was set up in 2015–2016, which alongside increased security led to a temporary end to the practice of bathing in the river together with the Slovenes. Within days of being set up, a Cervus elaphus individual became entangled in the wire and died across the river from Blaževci. The barrier was flimsy and would often float to the middle of the river when it flooded. In January 2016, this led to the barrier being temporarily removed.

On 11 June 2019, Blaževci was hit by a hailstorm, causing significant roof damage.

In 2020, the border crossing was closed due to COVID-19 for a month and a half, which created significant health care problems for those cut off from their regular providers. For example, medicine from Kočevje would normally be transported to Čeplje and from there to the border, where Blaževci residents would receive them. The COVID restrictions rerouted their care to Ogulin and Vrbovsko instead. In addition to health care problems, there was an incident where a girl who attended school in Slovenia was not allowed to return to Croatia.

In October 2022, Blaževci and Štefanci were hit with a relatively severe flood, carrying mud with it and causing basement damage. The last such flood occurred in 2005, but the water level then was somewhat lower.

=== New borderless era ===
As of 2023, the sawmill was still in the Kapš family and had been employing 11 people, but lowered the number of employees that year. Its annual profit that year was 1,057,385 Euros.

In November 2023, the Kupa flooded to a level high enough at Stena that the road had to be crossed with a tractor as a taxi. This was a solution to a recurring problem on that part of the road, as with past floods: September 2022, December 2017, November 2016, November 2012, September 2010.

== Demographics ==
Emigration to countries like Canada, Germany, Australia and Sweden were significant sources of population decline already in 1957. By 2000, only 9 houses were still residential, while 11 remained empty. As of 2021, there were only 8 inhabitants under the age of 20.

Village of Blaževci: Population trends 1857–2021
v

| population | 238 | 221 | 233 | 237 | 183 | 151 | 122 | 107 | 113 | 103 | 93 | 67 | 44 | 89 | 38 | 38 | 34 |
| | 1857 | 1869 | 1880 | 1890 | 1900 | 1910 | 1921 | 1931 | 1948 | 1953 | 1961 | 1971 | 1981 | 1991 | 2001 | 2011 | 2021 |

Sources: Croatian Bureau of Statistics publications

In 1870, Blaževci's porezna općina included Zapeć. Blaževci itself had 28 houses and 221 people.

In 1890, Blaževci had 43 houses and 237 people. Its villagers were under Plemenitaš parish and school districts, but were administered by Severin and taxed by Blaževci. Blaževci tax district also administered Zapeć with Šutejevac.

=== Further reading ===
- Kraljevski zemaljski statistički ured (1903). Političko i sudbeno razdieljenje i Repertorij prebivališta Kraljevina Hrvatske i Slavonije po stanju od 1. travnja 1903. Zagreb: Kraljevska hrvatsko-slavonsko-dalmatinska zemaljska vlada, 🖶 Kraljevska zemaljska tiskara.
- Kraljevski zemaljski statistički ured (May 1913). "Repertorij prebivališta po županijama, upravnim kotarima, gradovima, upravnim i poreznim općinama". Političko i sudbeno razdjeljenje i Repertorij prebivališta Kraljevina Hrvatske i Slavonije po stanju od 1. siječnja 1913. Zagreb: Kraljevska hrvatsko-slavonsko-dalmatinska zemaljska vlada, 🖶 Kraljevska zemaljska tiskara. pp. 1–126. Page 32.

== Politics ==
As of its foundation on 3 March 2008, it belongs to the local committee of Plemenitaš.

== Sports ==
The "Gorski Kotar Bike Tour", held annually since 2012, sometimes goes through Blaževci, such as in the first leg for 2024.

== Infrastructure ==
Blaževci has an Udaljeni pretplatnički multipleksor (UPM).

The water storage unit in Zaumol, with a capacity of 100 cubic metres (3,500 ft^{3}) at an elevation of 402.89 metres (1,321.8 ft), is also responsible for Plemenitaš, Zapeć, Blaževci and Štefanci.

== Dialect ==
The dialect of Blaževci is similar to that of Zaumol, Plemenitaš and so on.

According to locals, the dialect of Blaževci differed from the dialect of Štefanci enough to be recognisable. The last resident of Štefanci, Slavko Muhvić, grouped the dialect of Blaževci with that of Goršeti over that his own, likening the dialect of Štefanci to that of White Carniola.

The local speech has undergone dialect levelling under the influence of Standard Croatian, and speakers of the local dialect have said the speech of the 1980s differs markedly from the speech of the 2020s. Only the occasional émigré has preserved their dialect unadmixed.

In addition to those mentioned elsewhere, toponyms recorded in Blaževci dialect include Celine, Čišćine, Dugi Kraji, Kolarji, Kut, Lazine, Malenske, Nad Verhom, Njive od hiž, Prečnice, Prelazi, Pri Maleni, Reber, Srednje njive, Viplasi Vimol and Vimulaci.

== Bibliography ==
=== Dialectology ===
- Marinković, Marina (2018-06-29). "Mjesni govor Blaževaca u svjetlu pripadnosti zapadnome poddijalektu kajkavskoga goranskoga dijalekta" [The local speech of Blaževci in the light of its classification into the western subdialect of the Kajkavian Gorski kotar dialect]. Jezikoslovlje (in Croatian). 19 (1): 39–63. eISSN 1848-9001.
- Barac, Vida; Finka, Božidar (1963). "Ispitivanje govora u Gorskom kotaru". Ljetopis Jugoslavenske akademije znanosti i umjetnosti. 70: 385–389. ISSN 0373-9902.

=== Genealogy ===
- Korenčić, Mirko (1979). Naselja i stanovništvo Socijalističke Republike Hrvatske (1857–1971) [Villages and Population of the Socialist Republic of Croatia (1857–1971)]. Djela Jugoslavenske akademije znanosti i umjetnosti (in Serbo-Croatian). Vol. 54.
- Barac-Grum, Vida (1987-06-28). "Pogled na gorskokotarsku povijesnu antroponimiju" [A View into the Historical Anthroponymy of Gorski Kotar]. Rasprave Instituta za hrvatski jezik (in Croatian). 13 (1): 5–8. ISSN 1331-6745.

=== History ===
- Martinković (1854-04-10) [written 1854-03-14]. "Poziv od strane ureda c. kr. podžupani karlovačke nižepodpisani vojnoj dužnosti podvèrženi momci". Carsko kraljevske službene narodne novine (in Serbo-Croatian). Vol. 20, no. 82. p. 217. ISSN 1333-5243.
- Podžupan (1859-07-27) [written 1859-06-14]. "Poziv". Carsko kraljevske službene narodne novine (in Serbo-Croatian). Vol. 20, no. 170. pp. 433–434. ISSN 1333-5243.
