= Blaževci =

Blaževci may refer to:

- Blaževci, Bosnia and Herzegovina, a village near Tešanj and Teslić
- Blaževci, Croatia, a village near Vrbovsko
- Blaževci, Vrbica, historical name of Paskovci, a destroyed village near Vrbica, Osijek-Baranja County
- Blaževci, Sveti Rok, a hamlet of Sveti Rok
