= Zapeć =

Zapeć Zapeći
- Village
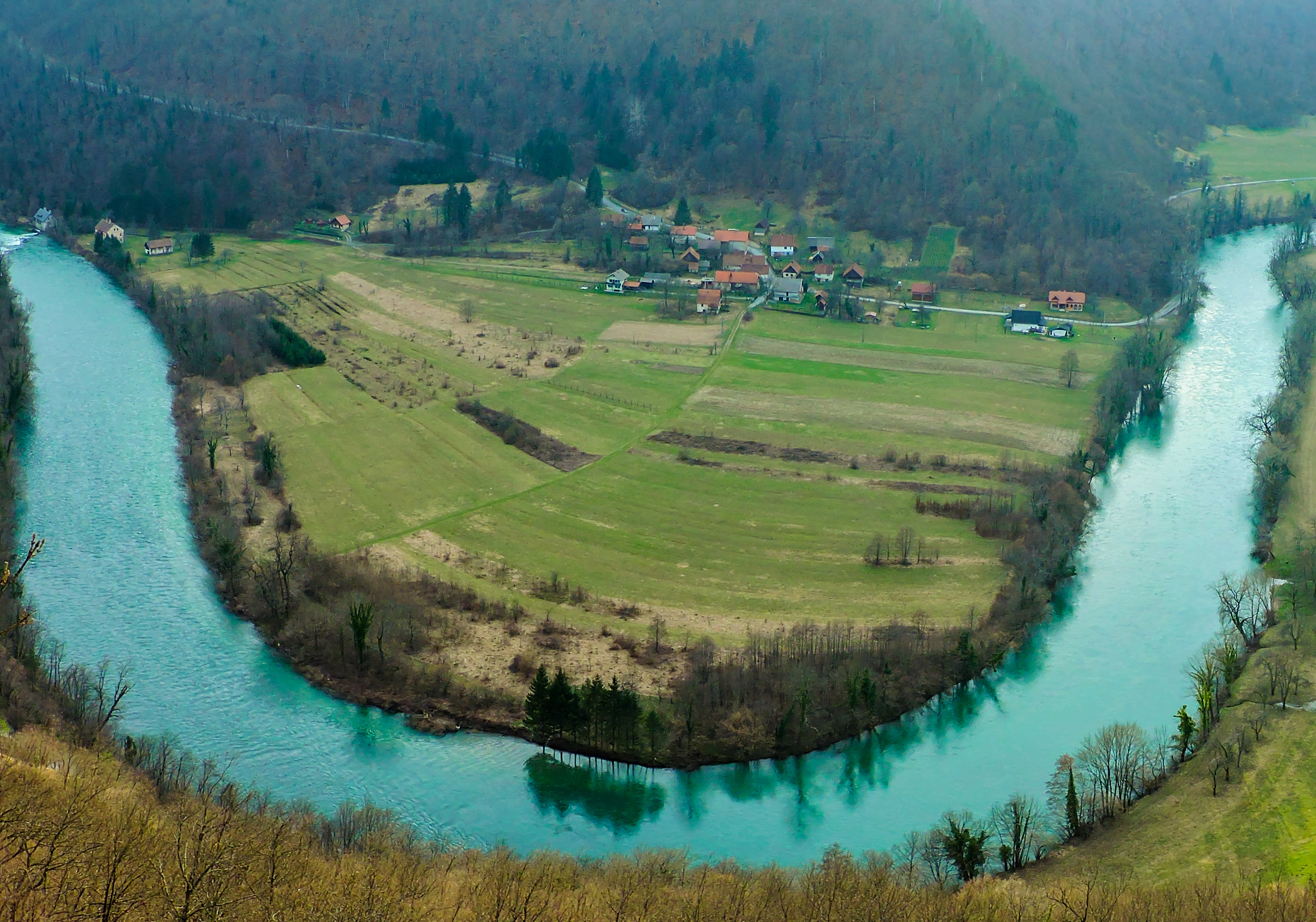
- Interactive map of Zapeć
- Location within Croatia
- Coordinates: 45.480836°N 15.082583°E
- Country: Croatia
- County: Primorje-Gorski Kotar County
- City: Vrbovsko
- Community: Plemenitaš

Area
  - Total: 4.4 km^{2} (1.7 sq mi)
- Elevation: 186 m (610 ft)

Population (2021)
  - Total: 10
  - Density: 2.3/km^{2} (5.9/sq mi)
- Time zone: UTC+1 (CET)
  - Summer (DST): UTC+2 (CEST)
- Postal code: 51326
- Area code: +385 051

Zapeć is a village in Croatia, under the Vrbovsko township, in Primorje-Gorski Kotar County. Ecclesiastically, it is under the Plemenitaš parish.

== Etymology ==
The village is named after a cave, "Peć", which has in turn taken on the name of the village as "Zapeć".

== Architecture ==
There is a mill (45.4770°N 15.0835°E) just south of Zapeć, opposite Dečina.

== History ==
On 28 June 1774, lord Mihal Mikulić of Severin on behalf of count Krsto II Oršić drew up in Severin a list of duties of freedmen and serfs in Razdrto, Štefanci, Blaževci, Zapeć, Plemenitaš and Košac. It was signed by Marko Barić of Zapeć. The villagers of Zapeć were serfs. The original survives in the HDA in Zagreb, survives in the HDA, and was published by Rudolf Strohal.

Ecclesiastically, Zapeć has belonged to the parish of Plemenitaš since its foundation in 1805, before which it was under Lukovdol, although its parish registers were in Stari Trg ob Kolpi until the construction of the present church in Plemenitaš in 1790.

Zapeć has always been well-connected with the Slovene side of the river as well, and of all the villages on the Croatian side of the Predgrad-Radenci valley it saw the most marriages across the river.

The sawmill of Dušan Vilhar was in function until 1968 and had customers on both sides of the river, after which business shifted to the sawmill in Blaževci.

The telephone lines were installed in 1981/1982 from Dol in Slovenia, so Zapeć ended up with a Ljubljana number along with Blaževci and Plemenitaš, contrasting with the rest of Vrbovsko municipality. Before the installation of telephone lines, one had to place a call at the telephone in the post office of Stari Trg.

The Blaževci-Plemenitaš road, which passes through Zapeć, was asphalted in 1986.

Zapeć was hit by the 2014 Dinaric ice storm.

== Demographics ==
As of 2021, there were no inhabitants under the age of 20.

Village of Zapeć: Population trends 1857–2021
v

population	99	91	106	118	88	74	61	70	57	49	47	46	25	28	20	9	10
	1857	1869	1880	1890	1900	1910	1921	1931	1948	1953	1961	1971	1981	1991	2001	2011	2021

Note:"Zapeći" in 1890 and 1900. Sources: Croatian Bureau of Statistics publications

In 1870, Zapeć, in Blaževci's porezna općina, had 12 houses and 91 people.

In 1890, Zapeći had 18 houses and 91 people. Šutejevac had 2 houses and 27 people. Its villagers were under Plemenitaš parish and school districts, but were administered by Severin and taxed by Blaževci.

=== Further reading ===
- Kraljevski zemaljski statistički ured (1903). Političko i sudbeno razdieljenje i Repertorij prebivališta Kraljevina Hrvatske i Slavonije po stanju od 1. travnja 1903. Zagreb: Kraljevska hrvatsko-slavonsko-dalmatinska zemaljska vlada, 🖶 Kraljevska zemaljska tiskara.
- Kraljevski zemaljski statistički ured (May 1913). "Repertorij prebivališta po županijama, upravnim kotarima, gradovima, upravnim i poreznim općinama". Političko i sudbeno razdjeljenje i Repertorij prebivališta Kraljevina Hrvatske i Slavonije po stanju od 1. siječnja 1913. Zagreb: Kraljevska hrvatsko-slavonsko-dalmatinska zemaljska vlada, 🖶 Kraljevska zemaljska tiskara. pp. 1–126. Page 32.

== Politics ==
As of its foundation on 3 March 2008, it belongs to the local committee of Plemenitaš.

== Linguistics ==
The local dialect is closely related to that of Blaževci, Zaumol, Plemenitaš, and Štefanci, belonging to the West Goranski dialect.

== Infrastructure ==
The water storage unit in Zaumol, with a capacity of 100 cubic metres (3,500 ft^{3}) at an elevation of 402.89 metres (1,321.8 ft), is also responsible for Plemenitaš, Zapeć, Blaževci and Štefanci.

== Gallery ==
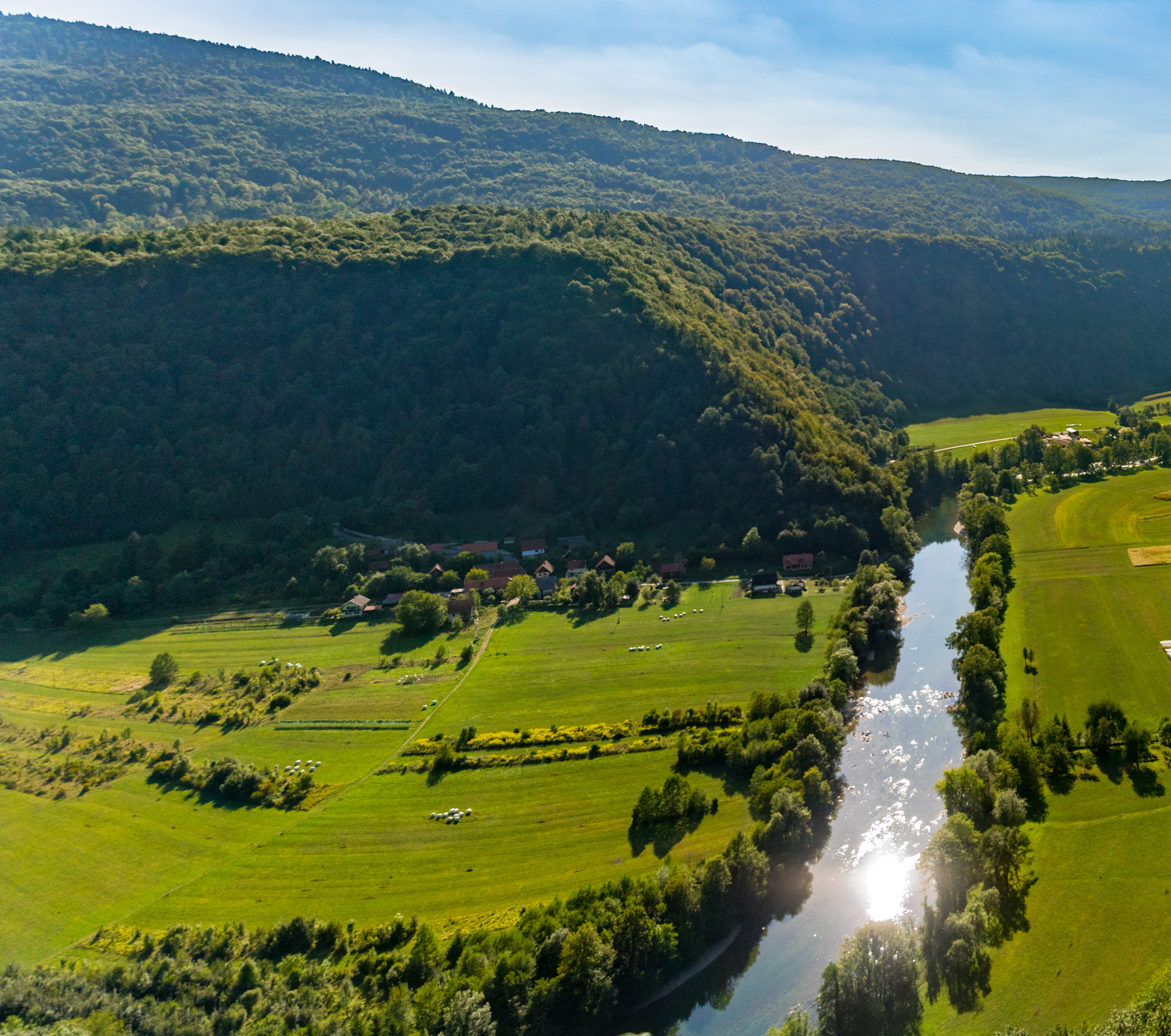
Seen from Slovenia.
