= Štefanci =

Village in Croatia

- Village
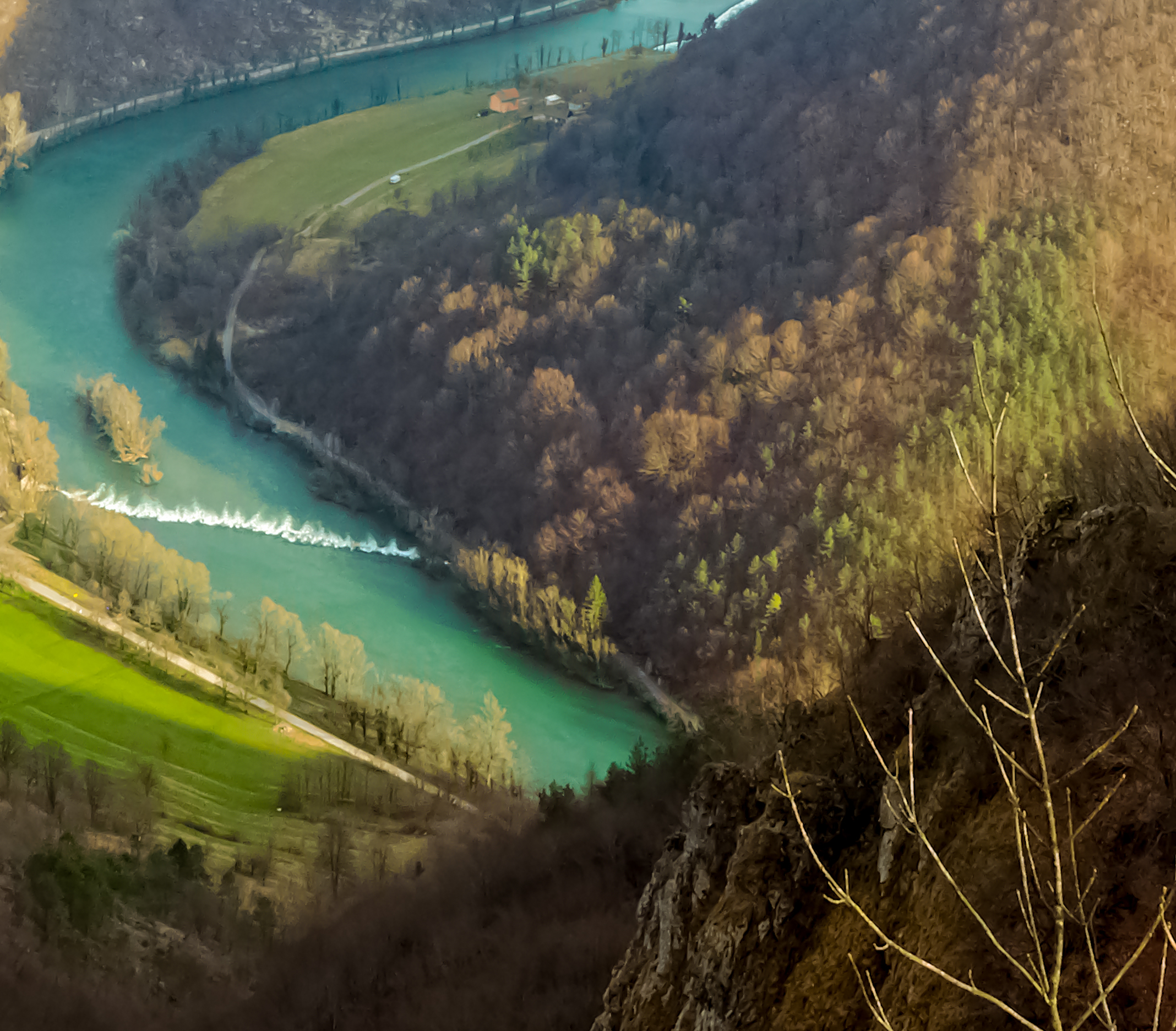
- Seen from Sodevska stena
- Interactive map of Štefanci
- Location within Croatia
- Coordinates: 45.490886°N 15.056319°E
- Country: Croatia
- County: Primorje-Gorski Kotar County
- City: Vrbovsko
- Community: Plemenitaš

Area
  - Total: 0.7 km^{2} (0.27 sq mi)
- Elevation: 198 m (650 ft)

Population (2021)
  - Total: 2
  - Density: 2.9/km^{2} (7.4/sq mi)
- Time zone: UTC+1 (CET)
  - Summer (DST): UTC+2 (CEST)
- Postal code: 51326
- Area code: +385 051

Štefanci is a village in Croatia, under the Vrbovsko township, in Primorje-Gorski Kotar County. As of its foundation on 3 March 2008, it belongs to the local committee of Plemenitaš. Ecclesiastically, it is under the Plemenitaš parish.

== History ==
On 28 June 1774, lord Mihal Mikulić of Severin on behalf of count Krsto II Oršić drew up in Severin a list of duties of freedmen and serfs in Razdrto, Štefanci, Blaževci, Zapeć, Plemenitaš and Košac. It was signed by Petar Štefanec of Štefanci. The villagers of Štefanci were freemen, although they could not prove it in writing. The original survives in the HDA in Zagreb, survives in the HDA, and was published by Rudolf Strohal.

Intermarriages across the Kupa were not uncommon historically, with such marriages taking place on the territory of Plemenitaš in 1884 (with Daljnje Njive), 1885 (Toplica in Carniola), 1886 (Stari Trg), 1919 (Predgrad), 1926 (Sodevci), and possibly some cases after 1945. In all such cases but 1886, the man was from Štefanci and the woman from across the river.

Midnight Mass was attended in Stari Trg, crossing the Kupa in a čun by torchlight.

Primary education was typically in Stari Trg, because it was nearer than the schools in Plemenitaš and Lukovdol.

=== Federal era ===
In Yugoslav times, the youth would entertain themselves in Predgrad, where the nearest cinema was, as well as an inn and dancing.

In the years after the foundation of Yugoslavia, there were few in the valley working non-traditional trades. One such person was a certain Franje from Štefanci who worked as an electrician in Kočevje even in his youth.

Wine from Štefanci was once favoured by an innkeeper in Stari Trg.

Before 1981, ferries operated in Štefanci, Blaževci and Radenci. The boat in Štefanci was larger, because it carried larger cargo for the mill in Prelesje. In 1981, the bridge between Blaževci and Sodevci was built. Goršeti had been the other contender location at the time, but at a different point in time, Štefanci was also a contender for a bridge, with a snow roof planned. The plan failed because certain landholders did not want to give up their parcels, and others feared their orchards would suffer from theft by travellers. In the end, the sawmill owner Kapš gave his land up for the bridge. The last resident regretted that the bridge had not been built in Štefanci, surmising more people would have remained.

=== Recent ===
In 2005, Štefanci and Blaževci were hit with severe flooding.

In November 2006, a pack of wolves killed about 40 sheep belonging to the Kranjac family in Štefanci.

Štefanci was hit by the 2014 Dinaric ice storm.

On 11 June 2019, Štefanci and Blaževci wee hit by a hailstorm, causing significant roof damage.

In October 2022, Štefanci and Blaževci were hit with a relatively severe flood, carrying mud with it and causing basement damage. The last such flood occurred in 2005, but the water level then was somewhat lower.

== Demographics ==
As of 2024, the village had only 1 permanent resident. There were no inhabitants under the age of 40.

Village of Štefanci: Population trends 1857–2021
v

population	52	47	48	56	48	42	40	49	46	44	20	16	7	19	4	3	2
	1857	1869	1880	1890	1900	1910	1921	1931	1948	1953	1961	1971	1981	1991	2001	2011	2021

Sources: Croatian Bureau of Statistics publications

In 1870, Štefanci, in Razdrto's porezna općina, had 7 houses and 47 people.

In 1890, Štefanci itself had 12 houses and 56 people. The villagers of Štefanci were under Plemenitaš parish. They attended the school in Plemenitaš but were administered by Severin and taxed by Razdrto.

=== Further reading ===
- Kraljevski zemaljski statistički ured (1903). Političko i sudbeno razdieljenje i Repertorij prebivališta Kraljevina Hrvatske i Slavonije po stanju od 1. travnja 1903. Zagreb: Kraljevska hrvatsko-slavonsko-dalmatinska zemaljska vlada, 🖶 Kraljevska zemaljska tiskara.
- Kraljevski zemaljski statistički ured (May 1913). "Repertorij prebivališta po županijama, upravnim kotarima, gradovima, upravnim i poreznim općinama". Političko i sudbeno razdjeljenje i Repertorij prebivališta Kraljevina Hrvatske i Slavonije po stanju od 1. siječnja 1913. Zagreb: Kraljevska hrvatsko-slavonsko-dalmatinska zemaljska vlada, 🖶 Kraljevska zemaljska tiskara. pp. 1–126. Page 33.

== Dialect ==
According to locals, the dialect of Štefanci differed somewhat from the dialect of Blaževci enough to be recognisable. The last resident of Štefanci, Slavko Muhvić, grouped the dialect of Blaževci with that of Goršeti over that his own, likening the dialect of Štefanci to that of White Carniola.

== Infrastructure ==
The water storage unit in Zaumol, with a capacity of 100 cubic metres (3,500 ft^{3}) at an elevation of 402.89 metres (1,321.8 ft), is also responsible for Plemenitaš, Zapeć, Blaževci and Štefanci.

== Bibliography ==
- Korenčić, Mirko (1979). Naselja i stanovništvo Socijalističke Republike Hrvatske (1857–1971) [Villages and Population of the Socialist Republic of Croatia (1857–1971)]. Djela Jugoslavenske akademije znanosti i umjetnosti (in Serbo-Croatian). Vol. 54.
