= Plemenitaš =

- Village
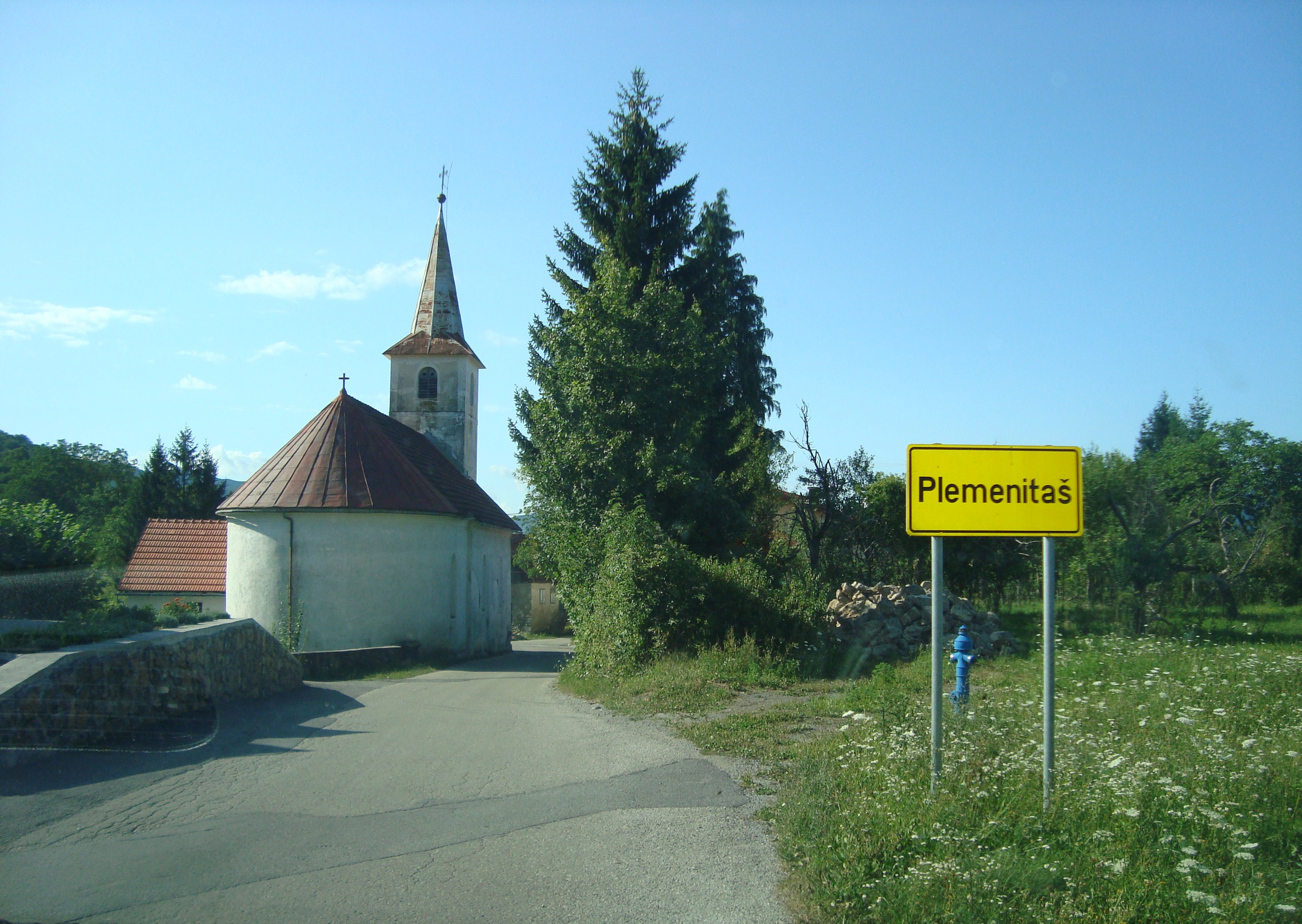
- Interactive map of Plemenitaš
- Location within Croatia
- Coordinates: 45.465127°N 15.082326°E
- Country: Croatia
- County: Primorje-Gorski Kotar County
- City: Vrbovsko

Area
  - Total: 7.9 km^{2} (3.1 sq mi)
- Elevation: 360 m (1,180 ft)

Population (2021)
  - Total: 38
  - Density: 4.8/km^{2} (12/sq mi)
- Time zone: UTC+1 (CET)
  - Summer (DST): UTC+2 (CEST)
- Postal code: 51326
- Area code: +385 051

Plemenitaš, sometimes called Plemenitaši, is a village in Croatia, under the Vrbovsko township, in Primorje-Gorski Kotar County. It is the seat of a parish encompassing Blaževci, Štefanci, Zapeć and Zaumol.

== History ==
On 28 June 1774, lord Mihal Mikulić of Severin on behalf of count Krsto II Oršić drew up in Severin a list of duties of freedmen and serfs in Razdrto, Štefanci, Blaževci, Zapeć, Plemenitaš and Košac. It was signed by judge Mihalj Medved and Mate Marković of Plemenitaš. The villagers of Plemenitaš were serfs. The original survives in the HDA in Zagreb, survives in the HDA, and was published by Rudolf Strohal.

The parish of Plemenitaš was founded in 1805, before which it was under Lukovdol, although its parish registers were in Stari Trg ob Kolpi until the construction of the present church in Plemenitaš in 1790. The church itself, Sv. Antuna opata, dedicated to saint Anthony the Great, was according to the canonical visitation of 1753 founded 60 years earlier, so in the 1690s.

On the day of the 1867 Croatian parliamentary election in Lukovdol općina, 8 December, SP partisan Marko Domitrović of Zdihovo arrived claiming to have been sent by Ban Levin Rauch and Grand Župan Mirko Bogović. First, before the elections, he went around urging voters to vote for the government's candidate, issuing threats to state workers that they would lose their jobs if they did not vote for the NUS. Then, once the elections had begun, he blocked the entrance to the poll in the parish priest's house with the justification that elections were to be held in the open, despite the locally snowy conditions. The president of the deputation, Radoslav Lopašić, together with secretary Kovačić, pointed out to Domitrović that he did not himself have the right to vote in Lukovdol as a non-resident, at which Domitrović angrily retorted that "in three days" he would "take him away to Zagreb in chains". Lopašić asked him to show a legal document granting him such rights, and when he failed to produce one, he pointed out to Domitrović that as a judge he could have him arrested, but did not because it was a Sunday and the bell rang for mass. Many listened to Domitrović anyway and some left for Plemenitaš, where J. Medved was ultimately chosen. The next day, judge Lopašić escorted Domitrović on his way to Zagreb, but only after getting Domitrović to sign an admission that he had been sent by Rauch and Bogović.

The holiday of the patron saint in January was widely celebrated in the region, so that people came to the church from Radenci, Sodevci and Stari Trg. Before the Breakup of Yugoslavia, the custom of dražba before the church was practiced on both sides of the river.

In July 1936, Ivan Goran Kovačić and other HSS members and sympathisers founded Gospodarska sloga chapters in Severin and Lukovdol. On 16 August, they held a meeting in Plemenitaš.

In 1937, the Volunteer Fire Department (Croatian: Dobrovoljno vatrogasno društvo) of Blaževci-Plemenitaš was founded, today under the VZ grada Vrbovsko. Its current commander is Robert Matjašec.

At the behest of Dušan Rašković, Ignacije Obrstar parish priest of Plemenitaš and others gathered in Delnice signed a document recognising the JNOF on 21 February 1945, selecting a delegation to represent the priesthood before their authority.

The telephone lines were installed in 1981/1982 from Dol in Slovenia, so Blaževci ended up with a Ljubljana number along with Blaževci and Zapeć, contrasting with the rest of Vrbovsko municipality. Before the installation of telephone lines, one had to place a call at the telephone in the post office of Stari Trg.

The Lukovdol-Plemenitaš road was asphalted in 1981.

The Blaževci-Plemenitaš road was asphalted in 1986.

For over a month beginning in mid-September 2011, Blaževci and several other remaining analog islands lost their television signal, though only from the Croatian side (Slovene channels were still available).

On 30 August 2012, a leak in Vrbovsko forced a water shutoff that affected Plemenitaš, among others.

Plemenitaš was hit by the 2014 Dinaric ice storm.

=== Košac ===
On 28 June 1774, lord Mihal Mikulić of Severin on behalf of count Krsto II Oršić drew up in Severin a list of duties of freedmen and serfs in Razdrto, Štefanci, Blaževci, Zapeć, Plemenitaš and Košac. It was signed by Ivan Mihelić of Košac. The original survives in the HDA in Zagreb, and was published by Rudolf Strohal. The villagers of Razdrto, Štefanci and Košac were freedmen, although they lacked written confirmation.

The 2014 Dinaric ice storm permanently blocked the old two-track dirt bridle path from Lesci to Košac.

== Demographics ==
As of 2021, there were only 5 inhabitants under the age of 20.

Village of Plemenitaš: Population trends 1857–2021
v

population	276	212	256	274	250	183	158	145	155	142	133	112	76	91	43	38	38
	1857	1869	1880	1890	1900	1910	1921	1931	1948	1953	1961	1971	1981	1991	2001	2011	2021

Note:Includes Košac from 1948 on. Sources: Croatian Bureau of Statistics publications

In 1870, Plemenitaš's porezna općina included Zaumol and Košac. Plemenitaš itself had 27 houses and 191 people. Košac had 4 houses and 21 people.

In 1890, Plemenitaš itself had 41 houses and 252 people. Košac had 5 houses and 22 people. The villagers of Plemenitaš and Košac were under Plemenitaš parish. They attended the school in and were taxed by Plemenitaš but were administered by Severin. The tax district of Plemenitaš also administered Zaumol. Plemenitaš also had a post office.

=== Further reading ===
- Kraljevski zemaljski statistički ured (1903). Političko i sudbeno razdieljenje i Repertorij prebivališta Kraljevina Hrvatske i Slavonije po stanju od 1. travnja 1903. Zagreb: Kraljevska hrvatsko-slavonsko-dalmatinska zemaljska vlada, 🖶 Kraljevska zemaljska tiskara.
- Kraljevski zemaljski statistički ured (May 1913). "Repertorij prebivališta po županijama, upravnim kotarima, gradovima, upravnim i poreznim općinama". Političko i sudbeno razdjeljenje i Repertorij prebivališta Kraljevina Hrvatske i Slavonije po stanju od 1. siječnja 1913. Zagreb: Kraljevska hrvatsko-slavonsko-dalmatinska zemaljska vlada, 🖶 Kraljevska zemaljska tiskara. pp. 1–126. Page 33.

== Religion ==
Ecclesiastically, the Lukovdol parish is under the Delnice diaconate, in turn under the Rijeka Archdiocese. By 1974, it was administered from Lukovdol.

In the 1930s, the parish numbered barely 1000 souls. Its Catholic parish was founded in 1807, and its parish church was built around 1790. In 1939, its parish had 503 souls, plus 300 outside the country.

List of parish priests of Plemenitaš:

- Administered from Lukovdol in 1939.
- ...
- Luka Lučić (- 2005)
- sede vacante (2005 -), administered by parish priest of Lukovdol, Branjo Dragojević

== Governance ==
=== Local ===
As of its foundation on 3 March 2008, it is the seat of a local committee encompassing Blaževci, Zapeć, Zaumol, Štefanci and Radočaj.

Presidents of local committee:

- Zdravko Osojnički (2008 - 2009, 2013 - 2017)
- Ivan Severinski (2009 - 2013), Independent
- Nikola Osojnički (2017 -)
- Krunoslav Pavlinac (2021 -), HDZ

== Sports ==
Beginning in 2013, the 7 stage 260 kilometres (160 mi) long Cycling Trail of Gorski Kotar (Croatian: Goranska biciklistička transverzala) passes through Plemenitaš and Ravni.

The "Gorski Kotar Bike Tour", held annually since 2012, sometimes goes through Plemenitaš, such as in the first leg for 2024.

== Infrastructure ==
The water storage unit in Zaumol is also responsible for Plemenitaš, Zapeć, Blaževci and Štefanci.

Plemenitaš has an Udaljeni pretplatnički multipleksor (UPM).

== Bibliography ==
- OONF PGO (1945-03-19). "Svećenstvo Gorskog Kotara pristupa JNOf-i". Primorski vjesnik: Glasilo jedinstvene Narodno-oslobodilačke fronte Hrvatskog primorja (in Serbo-Croatian). No. 144. p. 4.
- Draganović, Krunoslav (1939-04-20). Opći šematizam Katoličke crkve u Jugoslaviji. Sarajevo: Akademija "Regina Apostolorum".
- Draganović, Krunoslav; Bezić, Srećko [in Croatian]; Crnković, Josip; Lešnik, Rafael; Mršo, Ivan [in Croatian]; Reven, Zdravko [in Slovenian]; Weber, Hinko (1975-05-05). Opći šematizam Katoličke Crkve u Jugoslaviji 1974 [General Directory of the Catholic Church in Yugoslavia 1974] (in Serbo-Croatian). Zagreb: Hrvatsko književno društvo sv. Ćirila i Metoda.
