= Zaumol =

- Village
- Interactive map of Zaumol
- Location within Croatia
- Coordinates: 45.457301°N 15.091252°E
- Country: Croatia
- County: Primorje-Gorski Kotar County
- City: Vrbovsko
- Community: Plemenitaš

Area
  - Total: 4.2 km^{2} (1.6 sq mi)
- Elevation: 370 m (1,210 ft)

Population (2021)
  - Total: 27
  - Density: 6.4/km^{2} (17/sq mi)
- Time zone: UTC+1 (CET)
  - Summer (DST): UTC+2 (CEST)
- Postal code: 51326
- Area code: +385 051

Zaumol is a village in Croatia, under the Vrbovsko township, in Primorje-Gorski Kotar County.

== History ==
The Lukovdol-Plemenitaš road, which passes through Zaumol, was asphalted in 1981.

In September 2012, an Italian national became lost while mushroom hunting between Gorenci and Zaumol and had to be rescued by the HGSS.

Zaumol was hit by the 2014 Dinaric ice storm.

== Demographics ==
As of 2021, there were only 9 inhabitants under the age of 20.

In 1828/1830, there were 50 residents in 6 families, all Catholic.

Village of Zaumol: Population trends 1857–2021
v

population	85	67	83	80	65	70	56	72	69	59	49	50	40	41	39	39	27
	1857	1869	1880	1890	1900	1910	1921	1931	1948	1953	1961	1971	1981	1991	2001	2011	2021

Sources: Croatian Bureau of Statistics publications

In 1870, Zaumol, in Plemenitaš's porezna općina, had 13 houses and 67 people.

In 1890, Zaumol had 17 houses and 80 people. The villagers of Zaumol were under Plemenitaš parish. They attended the school in and were taxed by Plemenitaš but were administered by Severin.

=== Further reading ===
- Kraljevski zemaljski statistički ured (1903). Političko i sudbeno razdieljenje i Repertorij prebivališta Kraljevina Hrvatske i Slavonije po stanju od 1. travnja 1903. Zagreb: Kraljevska hrvatsko-slavonsko-dalmatinska zemaljska vlada, 🖶 Kraljevska zemaljska tiskara.
- Kraljevski zemaljski statistički ured (May 1913). "Repertorij prebivališta po županijama, upravnim kotarima, gradovima, upravnim i poreznim općinama". Političko i sudbeno razdjeljenje i Repertorij prebivališta Kraljevina Hrvatske i Slavonije po stanju od 1. siječnja 1913. Zagreb: Kraljevska hrvatsko-slavonsko-dalmatinska zemaljska vlada, 🖶 Kraljevska zemaljska tiskara. pp. 1–126. Page 33.

== Politics ==
As of its foundation on 3 March 2008, it belongs to the local committee of Plemenitaš. Ecclesiastically, it is under the Plemenitaš parish.

== Sports ==
Beginning in 2013, the 7 stage 260 kilometres (160 mi) long Cycling Trail of Gorski Kotar (Croatian: Goranska biciklistička transverzala) passes through Zaumol.

The "Gorski Kotar Bike Tour", held annually since 2012, sometimes goes through Zaumol, such as in the first leg for 2024.

== Infrastructure ==
The water storage unit in Zaumol, with a capacity of 100 cubic metres (3,500 ft^{3}) at an elevation of 402.89 metres (1,321.8 ft), is also responsible for Plemenitaš, Zapeć, Blaževci and Štefanci.
