= Razdrto, Croatia =

Razdrto
- Village
- Interactive map of Razdrto
- Coordinates: 45.4742°N 14.0322°E
- Country: Croatia
- County: Primorje-Gorski Kotar
- Municipality: Brod Moravice

Area
  - Total: 3.9 km^{2} (1.5 sq mi)
- Elevation: 550 m (1,800 ft)

Population (2021)
  - Total: 1
  - Density: 0.26/km^{2} (0.66/sq mi)
- Time zone: UTC+1 (CET)
  - Summer (DST): UTC+2 (CEST)

Razdrto is a village in Croatia.

== History ==
On 28 June 1774, lord Mihal Mikulić of Severin on behalf of count Krsto II Oršić drew up in Severin a list of duties of freedmen and serfs in Razdrto, Štefanci, Blaževci, Zapeć, Plemenitaš and Košac. It was signed by Mihalj Panian of Razdrto. The original survives in the HDA in Zagreb, and was published by Rudolf Strohal. The villagers of Razdrto, Štefanci and Košac were freedmen, although they lacked written confirmation.

On 11 November 1854, Razdrto resident Ivan Kuretić, a used wares peddler, died without leaving a will, prompting the court in Vrbovsko to issue a notice that if no claimants showed up by 16 May the next year, all his assets would be transferred to his son Mihalj Kuretić.

== Demographics ==
Village of Razdrto: Population trends 1857–2021
v

population	146	178	175	182	146	150	137	116	96	99	60	45	31	21	9	2	1
	1857	1869	1880	1890	1900	1910	1921	1931	1948	1953	1961	1971	1981	1991	2001	2011	2021

Sources: Croatian Bureau of Statistics publications

In 1870, Razdrto's porezna općina included Štefanci and Radočaj. Razdrto itself had 20 houses and 178 people. Razdrto was in Brod-Moravice parish but Štefanci and Radočaj were in Plemenitaš parish.

In 1890, Razdrto itself had 32 houses and 182 people. The villagers of Razdrto were under Brod Moravice parish. They attended the school in Drage Male but were administered by Severin and taxed by Razdrto.

=== Further reading ===
- Kraljevski zemaljski statistički ured (May 1913). "Repertorij prebivališta po županijama, upravnim kotarima, gradovima, upravnim i poreznim općinama". Političko i sudbeno razdjeljenje i Repertorij prebivališta Kraljevina Hrvatske i Slavonije po stanju od 1. siječnja 1913. Zagreb: Kraljevska hrvatsko-slavonsko-dalmatinska zemaljska vlada, 🖶 Kraljevska zemaljska tiskara. pp. 1–126. Page 33.

== Sports ==
Beginning in 2013, the 7 stage 260 kilometres (160 mi) long Cycling Trail of Gorski Kotar (Croatian: Goranska biciklistička transverzala) passes through Razdrto.
