= Radočaj =

Radočaj may refer to:

- Radočaj, Vrbovsko, a village near Vrbovsko, Primorje-Gorski Kotar County, Croatia
- Radočaj Brodski, a village near Delnice, Primorje-Gorski Kotar County, Croatia
- Tamara Radočaj (born 1987), a Serbian basketball player
