= Jelenja Vas =

- Location in Slovenia
- Coordinates: 45°30′46.81″N 15°3′17.59″E
- Country: Slovenia
- Traditional region: Lower Carniola
- Statistical region: Southeast Slovenia
- Municipality: Kočevje

Area
  - Total: 1.73 km^{2} (0.67 sq mi)
- Elevation: 402.2 m (1,320 ft)

Population (2002)
  - Total: 28
- Postal code: 8342

Jelenja Vas (pronounced [jɛˈleːnja ˈʋaːs]; Slovene: Jelenja vas, German: Hirschdorf) is a settlement north of Stari Trg ob Kolpi in southern Slovenia. It belongs to the Municipality of Kočevje. The area is part of the traditional region of Lower Carniola and is now included in the Southeast Slovenia Statistical Region.
