= Srednji Radenci =

- Location in Slovenia
- Coordinates: 45°27′59.89″N 15°5′36″E
- Country: Slovenia
- Traditional region: White Carniola
- Statistical region: Southeast Slovenia
- Municipality: Črnomelj

Area
  - Total: 0.13 km^{2} (0.050 sq mi)
- Elevation: 189.7 m (622 ft)

Population (2020)
  - Total: 25
  - Density: 190/km^{2} (500/sq mi)
- Postal code: 8342

Srednji Radenci (pronounced [ˈsɾeːdnji ɾaˈdeːntsi]; German: Miterradenze) is a small settlement on the left bank of the Kolpa River 4.5 km south of Stari Trg ob Kolpi in the Municipality of Črnomelj in the White Carniola area of southeastern Slovenia. The area is part of the traditional region of Lower Carniola and is now included in the Southeast Slovenia Statistical Region.
