= Blaževci, Bosnia and Herzegovina =

Village in Bosnia and Herzegovina

Blaževci
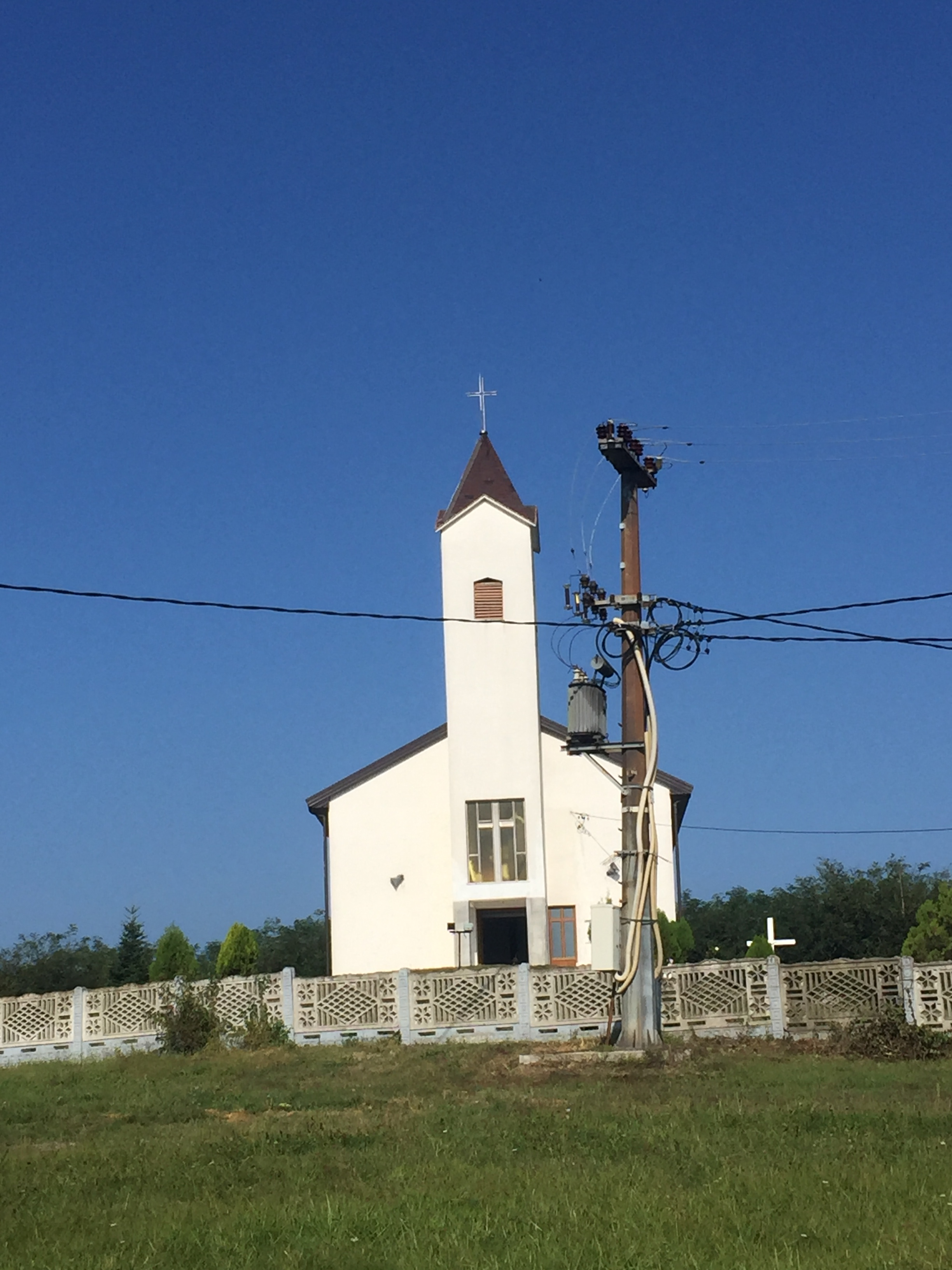

- Location within Bosnia and Herzegovina
- Coordinates: 44.6820329°N 17.8901969°E
- Country: Bosnia and Herzegovina
- Entity: Republika Srpska; Federation of Bosnia and Herzegovina
- Region Canton: Sarajevo; Zenica-Doboj
- Municipality: Tešanj; Teslić

Area
  - Total: 0.56 sq mi (1.46 km^{2})

Population (2013)
  - Total: 90
  - Density: 160/sq mi (62/km^{2})
- Time zone: UTC+1 (CET)
  - Summer (DST): UTC+2 (CEST)

Blaževci is a village in the municipalities of Teslić (Republika Srpska) and Tešanj, Bosnia and Herzegovina.

== Name ==
Blaževci is also the name of a village on the Kupa, a hamlet in Lika, and a historical village near Vrbica in Slavonia destroyed in the 19th century.

== Demographics ==
According to the 2013 census, its population was 90, with 89 living in the Tešanj part and 1 Serb living in the Teslić part.

Ethnicity in 2013
Ethnicity	Number	Percentage
Croats	86	96.6%
Bosniaks	2	2.2%
Serbs	2	1.1%
Total	90	100%
