= Prelesje, Črnomelj =

Settlement in White Carniola, Slovenia

Prelesje
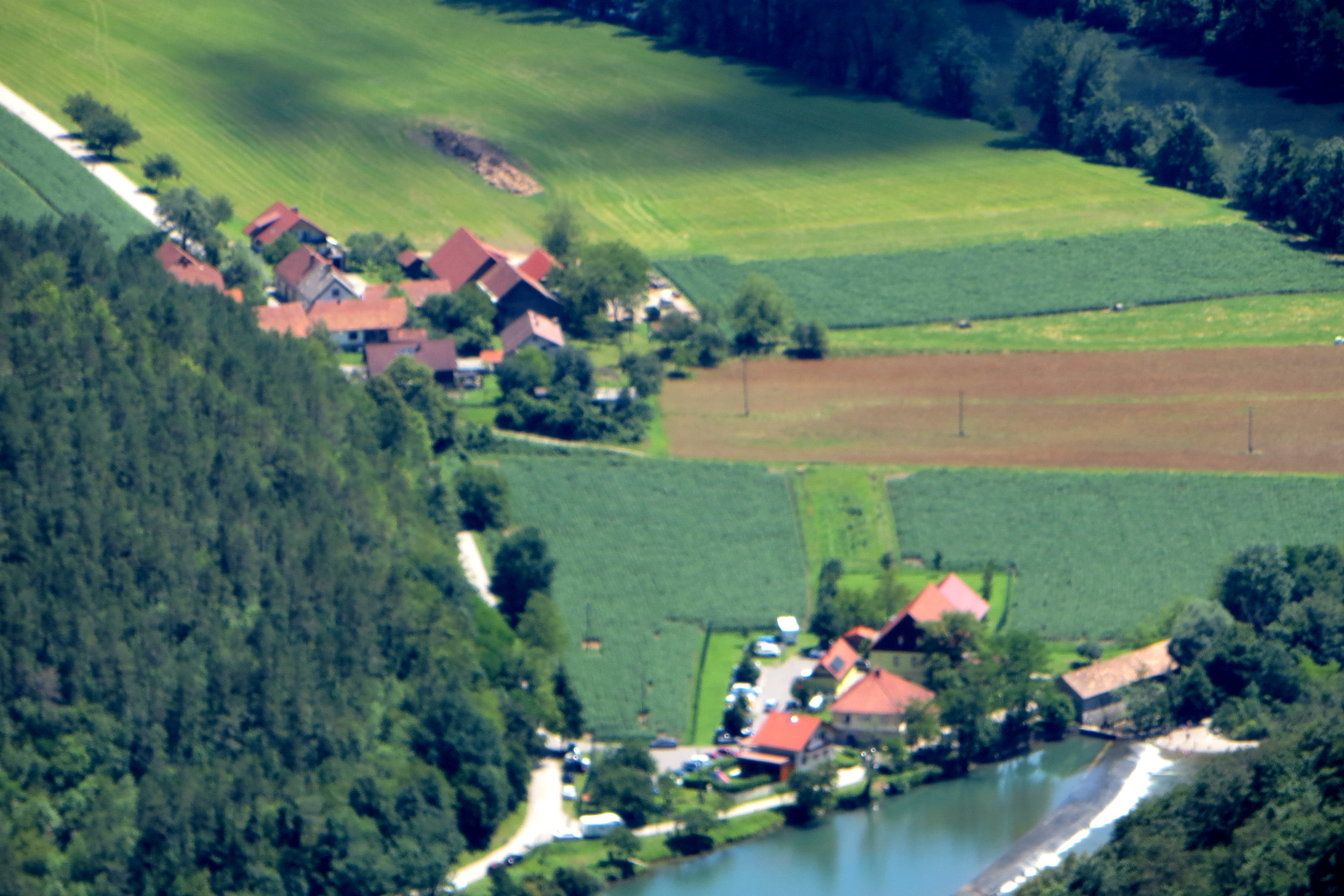

- Location in Slovenia
- Coordinates: 45°29′23.55″N 15°3′44.22″E
- Country: Slovenia
- Traditional region: White Carniola
- Statistical region: Southeast Slovenia
- Municipality: Črnomelj

Area
  - Total: 0.23 km^{2} (0.089 sq mi)
- Elevation: 198.7 m (652 ft)

Population (2020)
  - Total: 13
  - Density: 57/km^{2} (150/sq mi)
- Postal code: 8342

Prelesje (pronounced [pɾɛˈleːsjɛ]; German: Gerdenschlag) is a small settlement on the left bank of the Kolpa River west of Stari Trg ob Kolpi in the Municipality of Črnomelj in the White Carniola area of southeastern Slovenia. The area is part of the traditional region of White Carniola and is now included in the Southeast Slovenia Statistical Region.

== Gallery ==
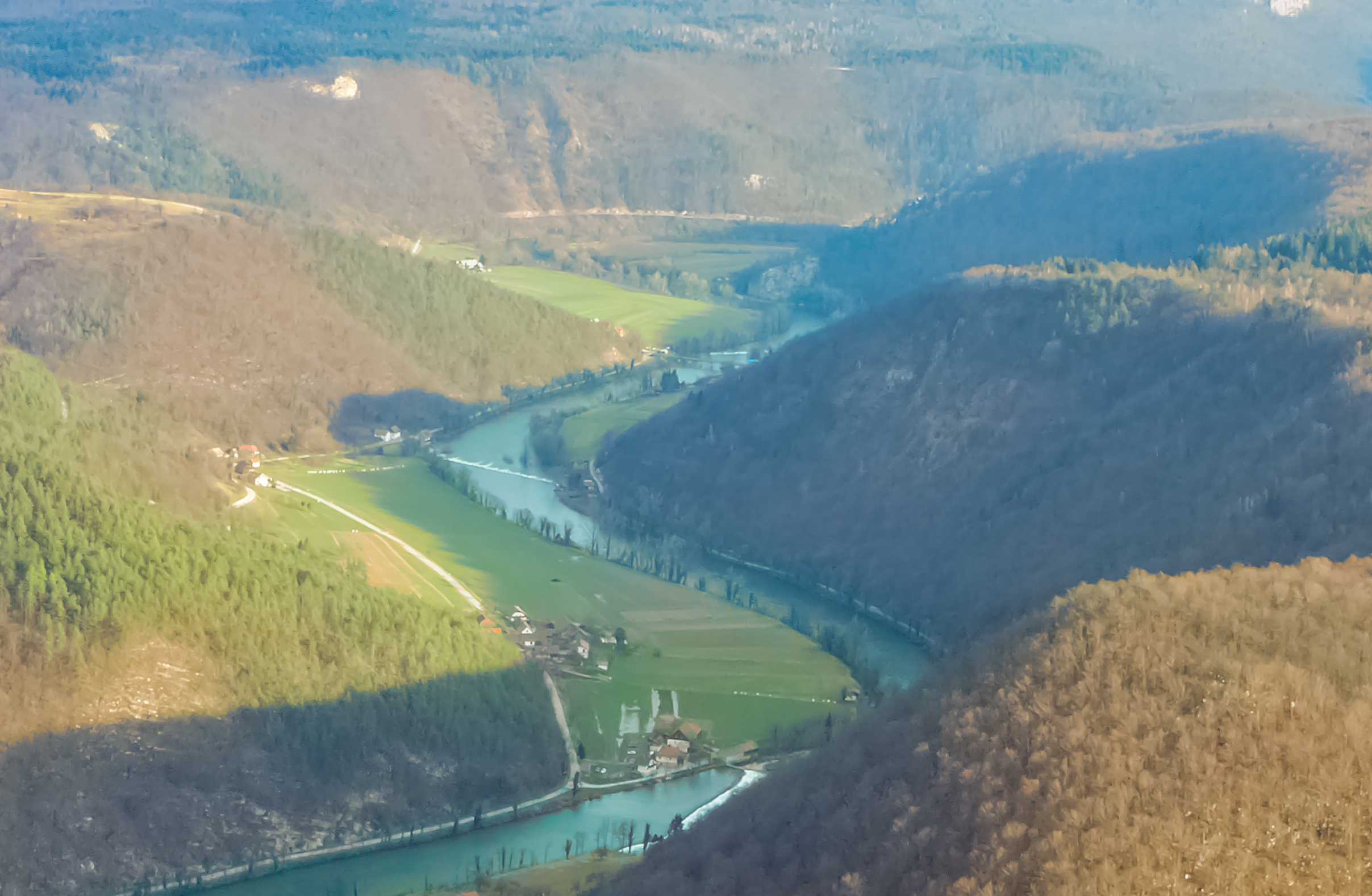
Prelesje in the Kolpa Valley
