= Radočaj, Vrbovsko =

Radočaj
- Village
- Interactive map of Radočaj
- Location within Croatia
- Coordinates: 45°29′01″N 15°03′00″E
- Country: Croatia
- County: Primorje-Gorski Kotar County
- City: Vrbovsko
- Community: Plemenitaš

Area
  - Total: 1.4 km^{2} (0.54 sq mi)

Population (2021)
  - Total: 0
  - Density: 0.0/km^{2} (0.0/sq mi)
- Time zone: UTC+1 (CET)
  - Summer (DST): UTC+2 (CEST)
- Postal code: 51326
- Area code: +385 051

Radočaj is a village in Croatia, under the Vrbovsko township, in Primorje-Gorski Kotar County.

== Demographics ==
As of 2011, it was one of four uninhabited statistical villages in Vrbovsko, along with Međedi, Podvučnik and Lesci. These were followed by Gornji Vukšići.

Village of Radočaj: Population trends 1857–2021
v

population	23	32	19	33	29	24	21	22	3	1	1
	1857	1869	1880	1890	1900	1910	1921	1931	1948	1953	1961	1971	1981	1991	2001	2011	2021

Note:From 1953 to 1991 under the name "Razdrto II. dio". Sources: Croatian Bureau of Statistics publications

In 1870, Radočaj, in Razdrto's porezna općina, had 3 houses and 32 people.

In 1890, Radočaj itself had 4 houses and 33 people. The villagers of Radočaj were under Plemenitaš parish. They attended the school in Plemenitaš but were administered by Severin and taxed by Razdrto.

=== Further reading ===
- Kraljevski zemaljski statistički ured (1903). Političko i sudbeno razdieljenje i Repertorij prebivališta Kraljevina Hrvatske i Slavonije po stanju od 1. travnja 1903. Zagreb: Kraljevska hrvatsko-slavonsko-dalmatinska zemaljska vlada, 🖶 Kraljevska zemaljska tiskara.
- Kraljevski zemaljski statistički ured (May 1913). "Repertorij prebivališta po županijama, upravnim kotarima, gradovima, upravnim i poreznim općinama". Političko i sudbeno razdjeljenje i Repertorij prebivališta Kraljevina Hrvatske i Slavonije po stanju od 1. siječnja 1913. Zagreb: Kraljevska hrvatsko-slavonsko-dalmatinska zemaljska vlada, 🖶 Kraljevska zemaljska tiskara. pp. 1–126. Page 33.

== Politics ==
As of its foundation on 3 March 2008, it belongs to the local committee of Plemenitaš.

== Economy ==
The Ravni – Radočaj hunting grounds are nearby.
