= Dolenji Radenci =

- Location in Slovenia
- Coordinates: 45°27′58.58″N 15°5′55.79″E
- Country: Slovenia
- Traditional region: White Carniola
- Statistical region: Southeast Slovenia
- Municipality: Črnomelj

Area
  - Total: 7.12 km^{2} (2.75 sq mi)
- Elevation: 185.4 m (608 ft)

Population (2020)
  - Total: 24
  - Density: 3.4/km^{2} (8.7/sq mi)
- Postal code: 8342

Dolenji Radenci (pronounced [dɔˈleːnji ɾaˈdeːntsi]; German: Unterradenze) is a small settlement on the left bank of the Kolpa River in the Municipality of Črnomelj in the White Carniola area of southeastern Slovenia. The area is part of the traditional region of Lower Carniola and is now included in the Southeast Slovenia Statistical Region.

There is a small chapel-shrine in the settlement dedicated to the Virgin Mary. It bears the date 1868.

== Sports ==
The Gorski Kotar Bike Tour, held annually since 2012, sometimes goes through Dolenji Radenci, such as in the first leg for 2024.
