= Predgrad =

- Location in Slovenia
- Coordinates: 45°30′16.04″N 15°3′20.32″E
- Country: Slovenia
- Traditional region: Lower Carniola
- Statistical region: Southeast Slovenia
- Municipality: Kočevje

Area
  - Total: 5.15 km^{2} (1.99 sq mi)
- Elevation: 372.1 m (1,221 ft)

Population (2002)
  - Total: 95
- Postal code: 8342

Predgrad (pronounced [ˈpɾéːdɡɾat]; German: Vornschloß or Pölland) is a settlement in the Municipality of Kočevje in southern Slovenia. The area is part of the traditional region of Lower Carniola and is now included in the Southeast Slovenia Statistical Region.

The local church is dedicated to Saints Fabian and Sebastian and belongs to the Parish of Stari Trg ob Kolpi. It is a mid-18th-century Baroque building that replaced an earlier church on the site.

The settlement contains the scant ruins of a 13th-century castle that was destroyed in 1809 by Napoleon's forces.

Before the breakup of Yugoslavia, Saint Anne's Day was celebrated in Predgrad by residents from both sides of the Kolpa River.
