= Sodevci =

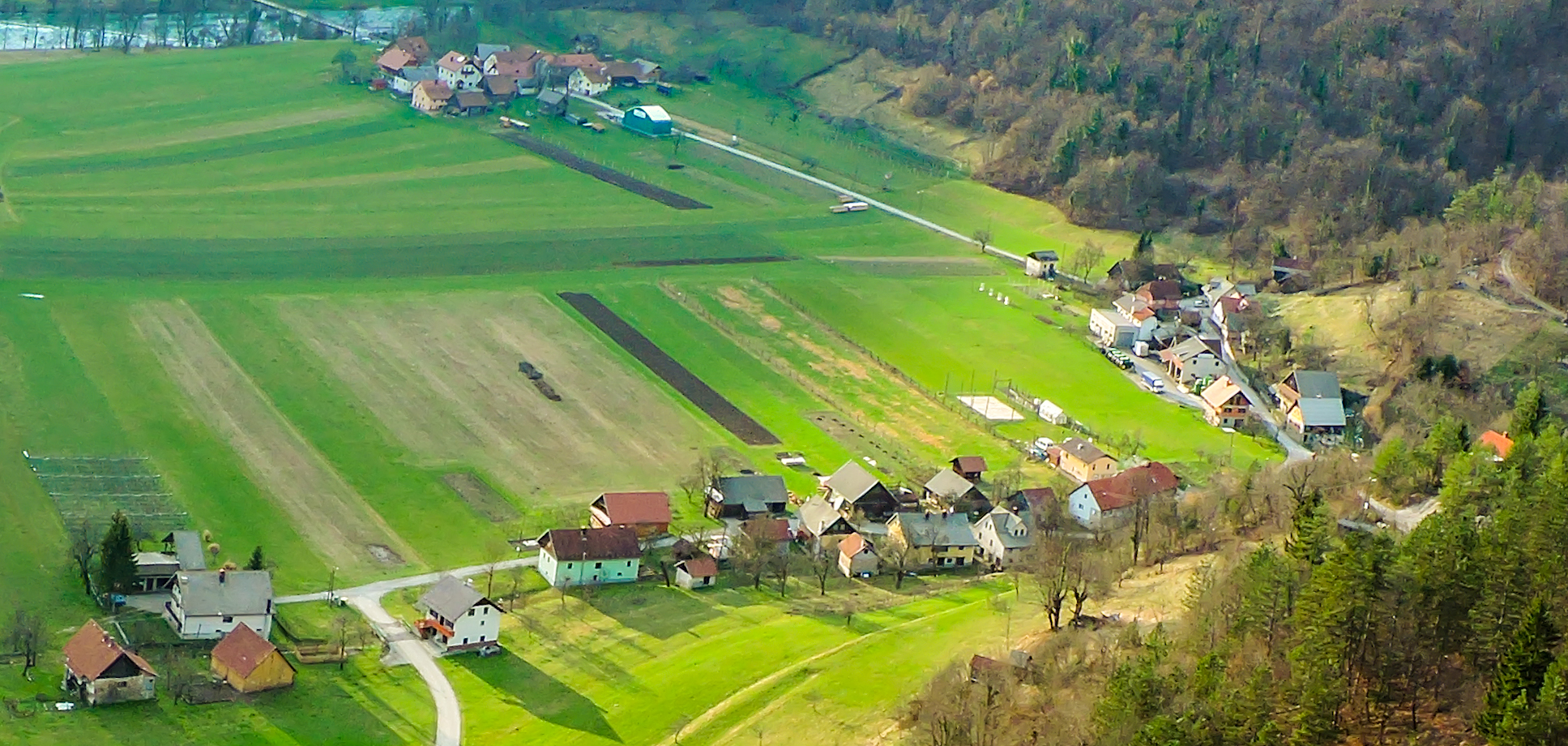

- Location in Slovenia
- Coordinates: 45°29′11.19″N 15°4′55.59″E
- Country: Slovenia
- Traditional region: White Carniola
- Statistical region: Southeast Slovenia
- Municipality: Črnomelj

Area
  - Total: 3.5 km^{2} (1.4 sq mi)
- Elevation: 203.2 m (667 ft)

Population (2020)
  - Total: 41
  - Density: 12/km^{2} (30/sq mi)
- Postal code: 8342

Sodevci (pronounced [sɔˈdeːu̯tsi]; in older sources also Sodevce, German: Schöpfenlag) is a settlement on the left bank of the Kolpa River south of Stari Trg ob Kolpi in the Municipality of Črnomelj in the White Carniola area of southeastern Slovenia. The area is part of the traditional region of Lower Carniola and is now included in the Southeast Slovenia Statistical Region.

== History ==
In 2014, a meeting was held in Sevnica between representatives of the 11th Government of Slovenia, representatives of the Croatian water management authority Hrvatske vode, Municipal Mayor Mojca Čemas Stjepanovič of Črnomelj, and representatives of the city of Vrbovsko on infrastructure reintegration between Črnomelj and Vrbovsko to promote tourism on both sides of the Kolpa River.

== Demographics ==
As of 2024, no new births had taken place in families that live in Sodevci in 20 years.

== Sports ==
The Gorski Kotar Bike Tour, held annually since 2012, sometimes goes through Sodevci, such as in the first leg for 2024.

== Gallery ==
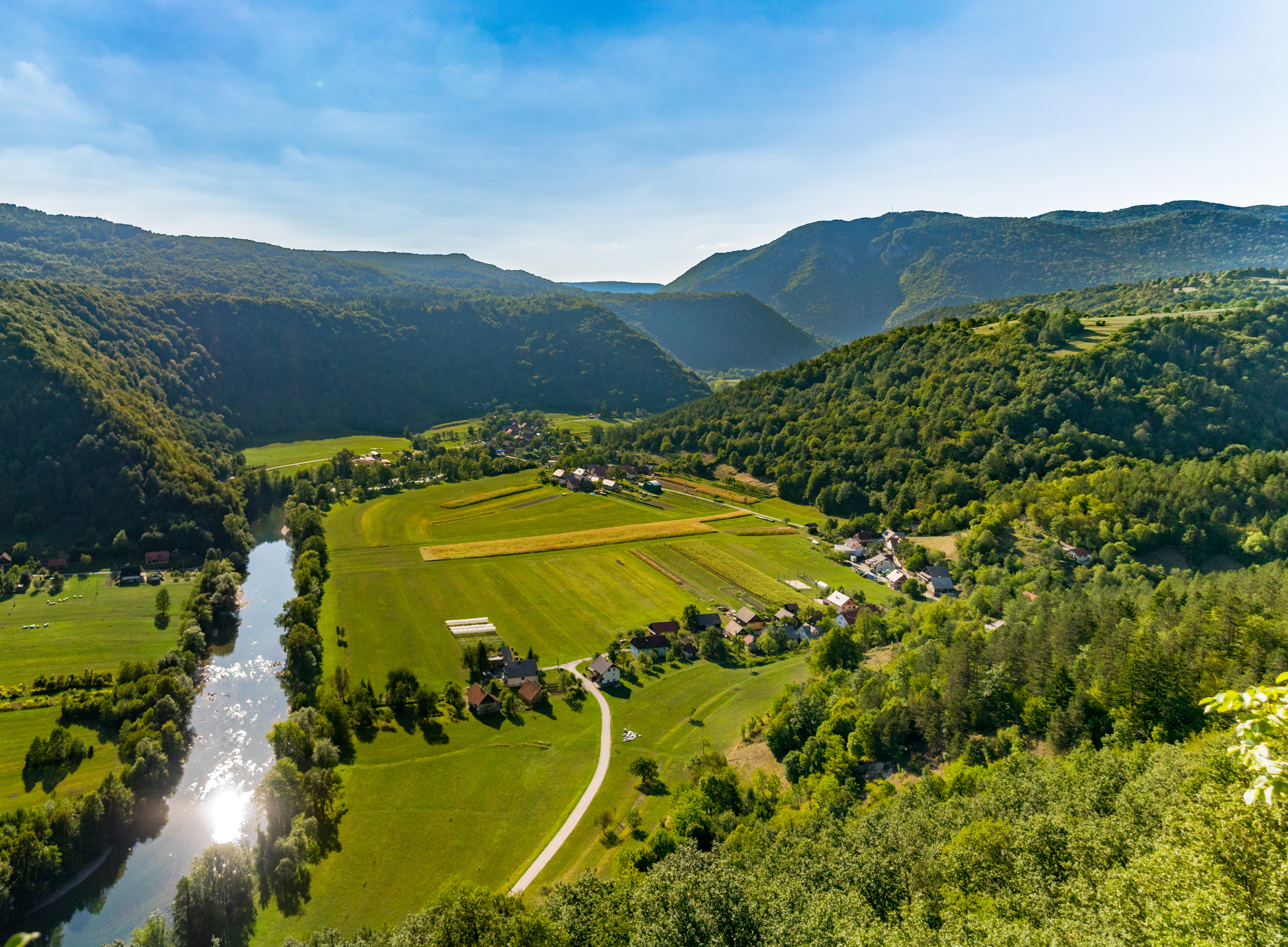
Sodevci from Sodevci Cliff (Sodevska stena)
