= Male Drage =

Settlement in Primorje-Gorski Kotar County, Croatia

- Settlement
- Interactive map of Male Drage
- Location of Male Drage in Croatia
- Coordinates: 45°28′15″N 15°00′45″E
- Country: Croatia
- County: Primorje-Gorski Kotar
- Municipality: Brod Moravice

Area
  - Total: 5.4 km^{2} (2.1 sq mi)
- Elevation: 506 m (1,660 ft)

Population (2021)
  - Total: 5
  - Density: 0.93/km^{2} (2.4/sq mi)
- Time zone: UTC+1 (CET)
  - Summer (DST): UTC+2 (CEST)
- Postal code: 51326 Vrbovsko

Male Drage is a settlement in the Municipality of Brod Moravice in Croatia. In 2021, its population was 5.

== Demographics ==
Male Drage: Population trends 1857–2021
v

population	233	234	204	217	256	248	216	192	132	124	88	84	52	27	14	5	5
	1857	1869	1880	1890	1900	1910	1921	1931	1948	1953	1961	1971	1981	1991	2001	2011	2021

Sources: Croatian Bureau of Statistics publications

== Sports ==
Beginning in 2013, the 7 stage 260 kilometres (160 mi) long Cycling Trail of Gorski Kotar (Croatian: Goranska biciklistička transverzala) passes through Male Drage.
