= Vrbica, Osijek-Baranja County =

Coordinates: 45°18′20″N 18°33′32″E

- Village (Selo)
- Interactive map of Vrbica, Osijek-Baranja County

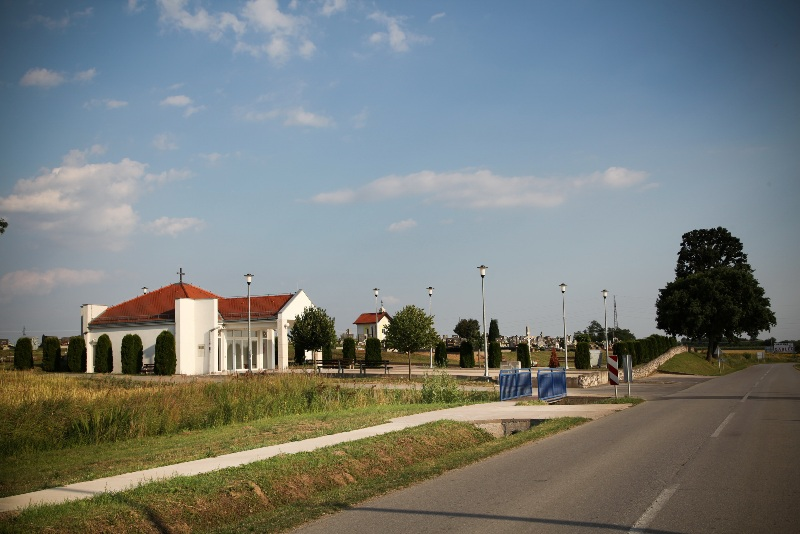
Vrbica Cemetery

Vrbica is a village near Semeljci, Croatia. In the 2011 census, it had 730 inhabitants.

One of its hamlets, Blaževci, also known as Peskovci, Paskovci, Paškovci and Raškovci, was burned along with many other surrounding villages on 10 January 1849 by Hungarians.
