= Stari Trg ob Kolpi =

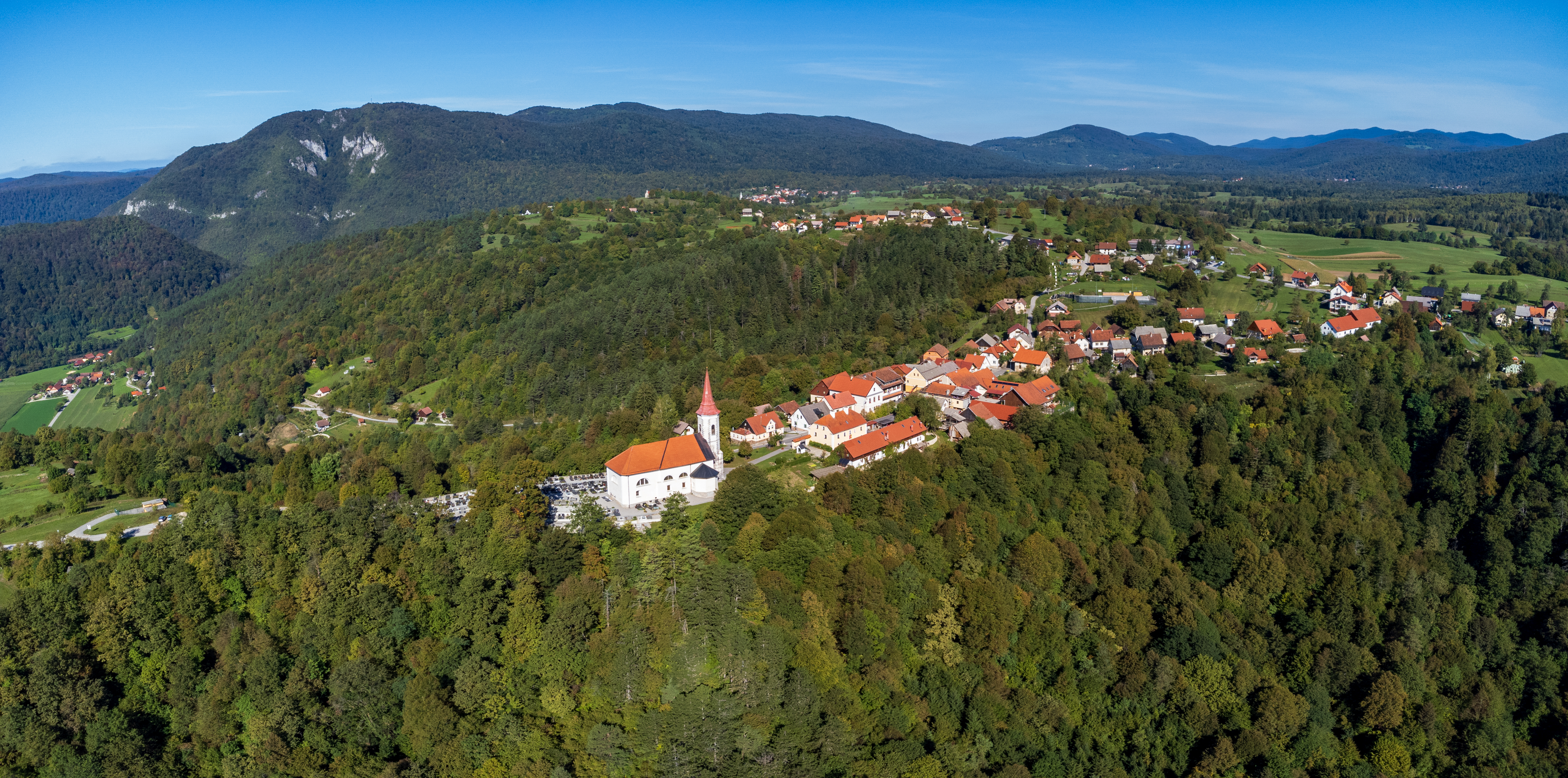

- Location in Slovenia
- Coordinates: 45°29′38.74″N 15°4′37.67″E
- Country: Slovenia
- Traditional region: White Carniola
- Statistical region: Southeast Slovenia
- Municipality: Črnomelj

Area
  - Total: 0.49 km^{2} (0.19 sq mi)
- Elevation: 376.3 m (1,235 ft)

Population (2020)
  - Total: 86
  - Density: 180/km^{2} (450/sq mi)
- Postal code: 8342

Stari Trg ob Kolpi (pronounced [ˈstaːɾi ˈtəɾk ɔp ˈkoːlpi]; Slovene: Stari trg ob Kolpi, formerly also known as Poljane; German: Altenmarkt) is a settlement above the left bank of the Kolpa River in the Municipality of Črnomelj in the White Carniola area of southeastern Slovenia. The area is part of the traditional region of Lower Carniola and is now included in the Southeast Slovenia Statistical Region.

The local parish church is dedicated to Saint Joseph and belongs to the Roman Catholic Diocese of Novo Mesto. It is a medieval building that was extensively rebuilt in 1632, when it was converted to a three-aisled building with two side chapels. The main altar dates to the 18th century.

== History ==
Before the breakup of Yugoslavia, the Kolpa was not an international border river, and so Stari Trg was well connected to the other side. For example, many Blaževci residents participated in the formation of the Stari Trg Volunteer Fire Department (Slovene: Prostovoljno gasilsko društvo Stari Trg ob Kolpi) because Blaževci did not have its own until 1937. The Stari Trg ob Kolpi Volunteer Fire Department was founded on 2 February 1894, with 58 members by the end of that summer.

== Gallery ==
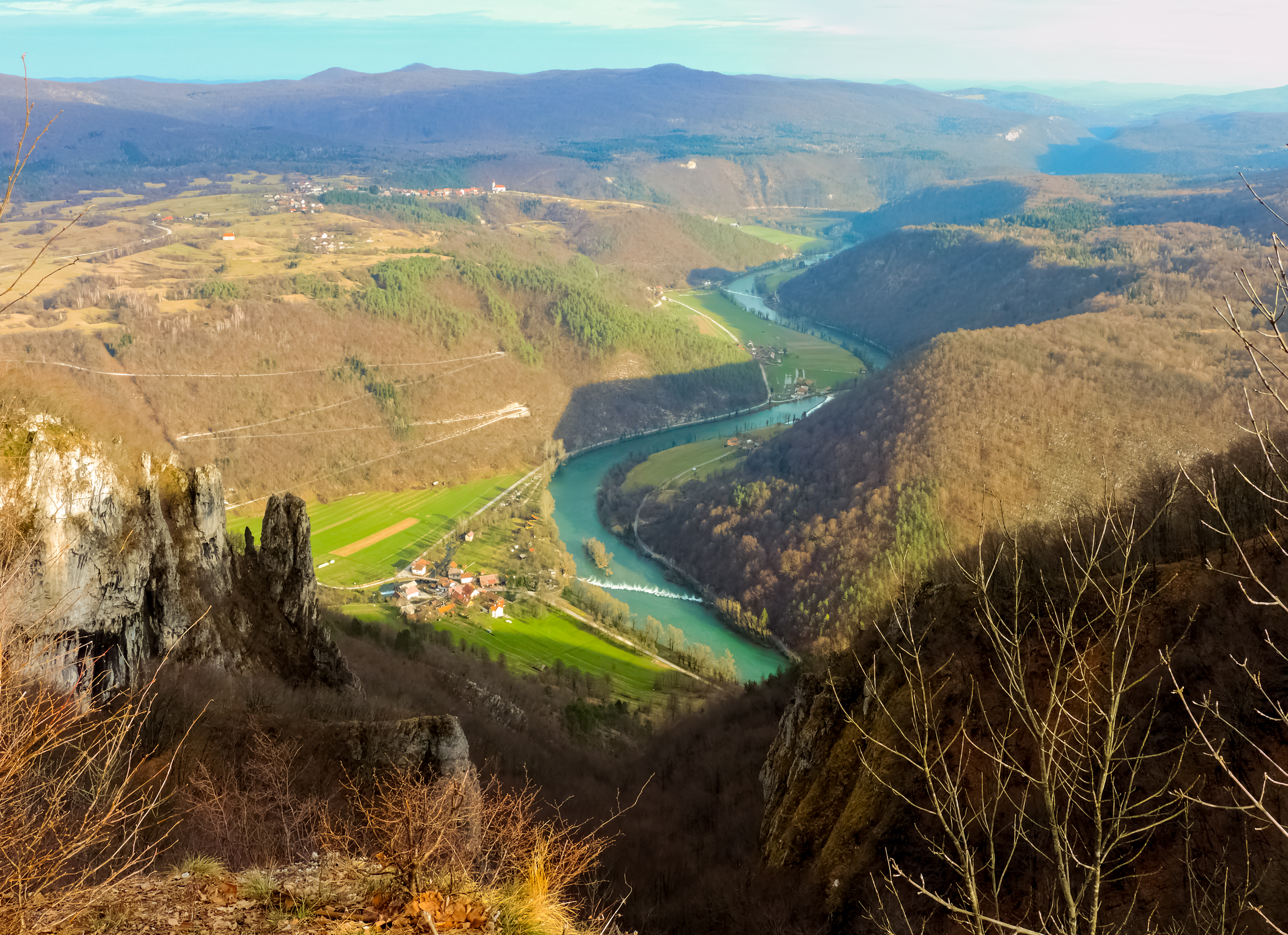
View from Sodevci Cliff (Sodevska stena)

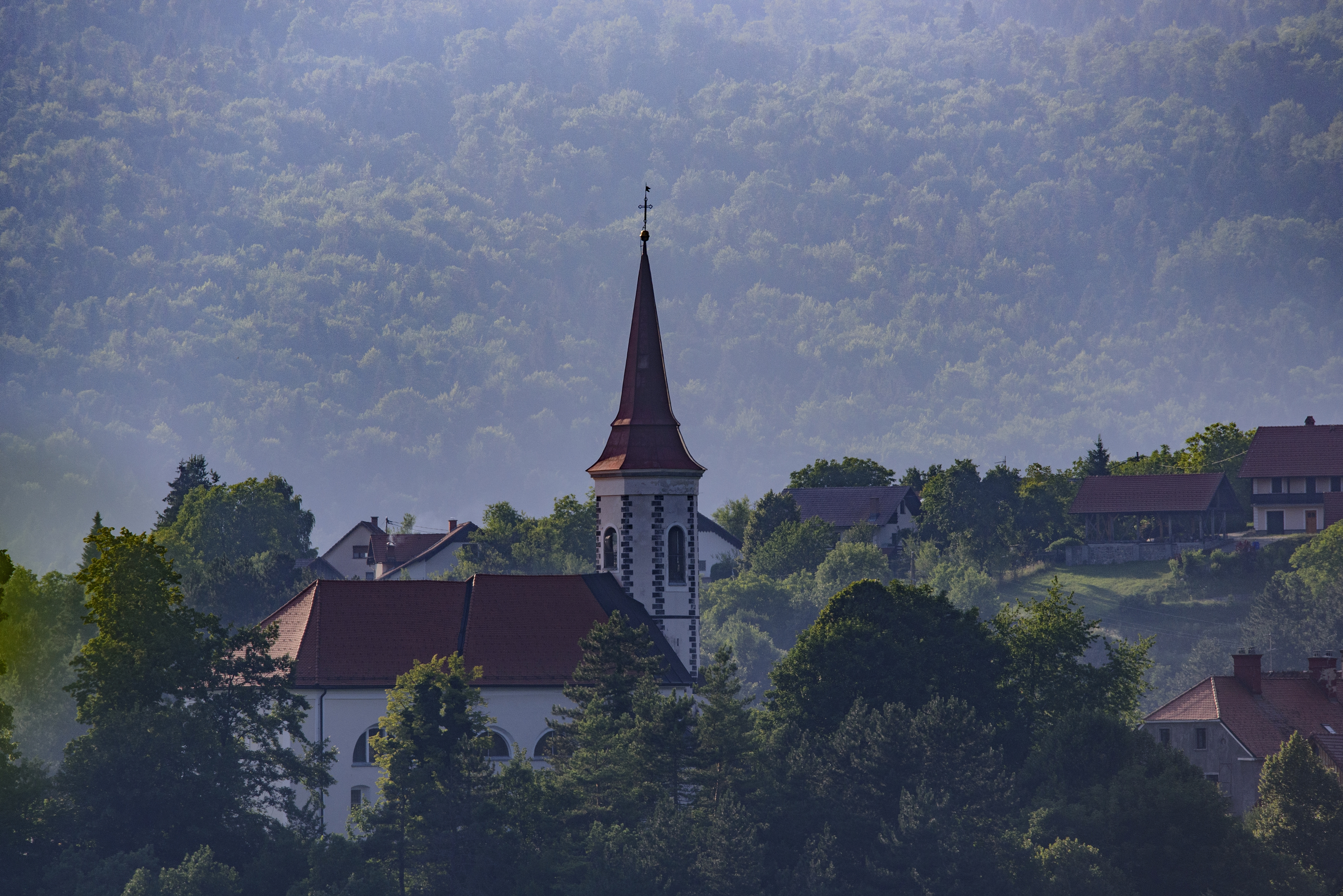
Saint Joseph's Church

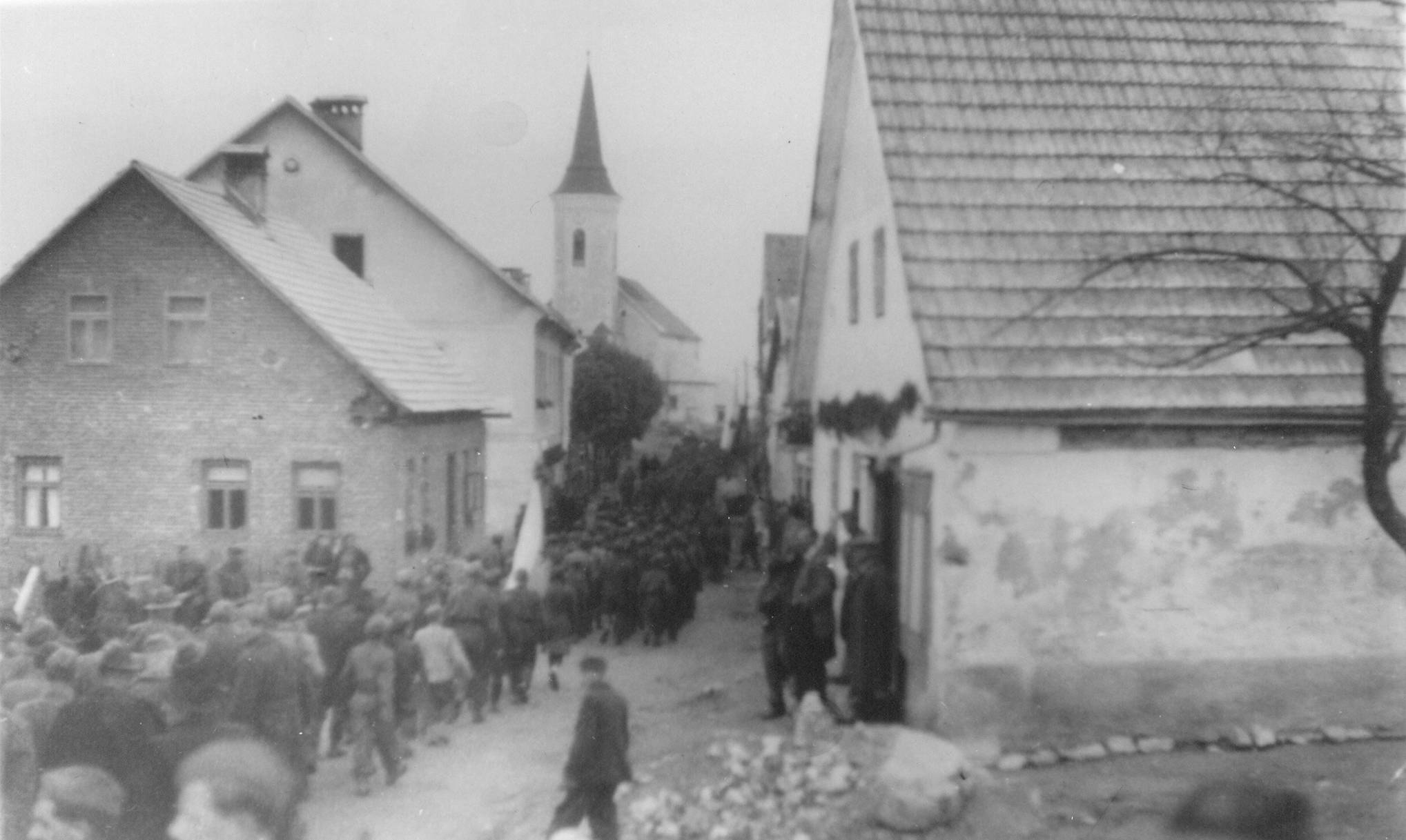
May Day c. 1943–1945
