= Oršić =

Oršić may refer to:

- Oršić family, Croatian early modern nobility
- Oršić Manor (disambiguation)
- Mislav Oršić (born 1992), Croatian footballer
