= Oršić Manor =

Oršić Manor or Oršić Castle may refer to:

- Oršić Manor (Jakovlje)
- Oršić Manor (Gornja Bistra)
- Oršić Manor (Gornja Stubica)
