= Oršić Manor (Gornja Bistra) =

Oršić Manor in Gornja Bistra
- Dvorac Oršić (Croatian)
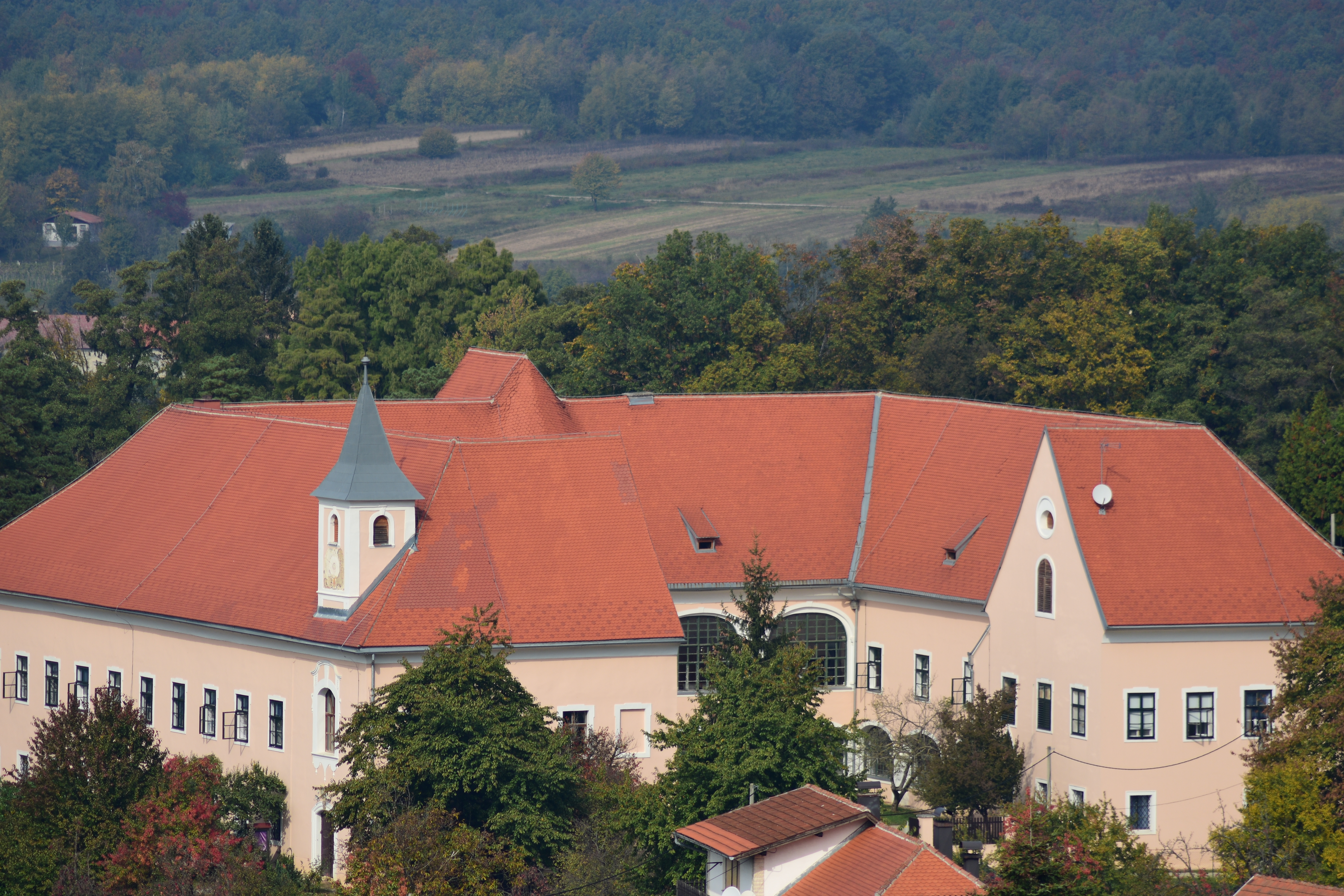
- The castle in 2018
- Interactive map of Oršić Manor in Gornja Bistra
- 45°55′0.49″N 15°54′16.26″E
- Location: Gornja Bistra, Croatia

History
- Built: c. 1770–1775

Site notes
- Architectural style: Baroque

Cultural Good of Croatia
- Official name: Dvorac Oršić
- Type: Protected cultural good
- Reference no.: Z-1896

Oršić Manor (Croatian: Dvorac Oršić) is a Baroque manor in Gornja Bistra, Zagreb County, Croatia. It lies near the city of Zaprešić, in the Hrvatsko Zagorje region northwest of Zagreb. Regarded through its design and spatial organisation as one of the most significant works of Baroque architecture in Croatia, it currently houses a hospital for chronic childhood illnesses, and is protected as a cultural good of the Republic of Croatia.

== History ==
The castle was built between about 1770 and 1775 to a design by an unknown architect, and was raised by the Lieutenant field marshal Count Krsto II Oršić, a member of one of the wealthiest Croatian noble families. Krsto Oršić was also the župan of Zagreb County and had served as a commander in the Austrian army during the reign of Maria Theresa. After his military career he settled on his country estate with his wife, Josipa née Zichy, where he built this lavish castle. His wife—known for her work in the Enlightenment spirit and for a book on the treatment of animals—died in 1778 at Oroslavje, shortly after the castle's completion, and Krsto died four years later in Zagreb.

== Architecture ==
The castle has three wings, forming a U-shaped plan, with the rooms arranged in a sequence along an arcaded corridor facing the courtyard. On the upper floor, at the central axis of the main wing, stands the ceremonial oval hall, decorated with illusionistic wall paintings from 1778. The work of a still-unidentified master, the paintings depict in their lower zone a painted architecture of pilasters and niches holding the gods Jupiter, Venus, Diana and Cronus, while the cupola bears a mythological scene of Diana and Apollo seated on clouds surrounded by the Muses. The spatial organisation is the same on both floors, defined by a row of rooms along the outer perimeter walls, while a corridor runs along the courtyard fronts, vaulted with a series of Bohemian vaults separated by plain bands. The ground-floor rooms are mostly covered by barrel vaults with lunettes, while the upper-floor rooms have trough vaults. The castle also preserves valuable inlaid woodwork.

At the end of the eastern wing is the chapel of St Joseph, completed in 1774 and notable for its painted altars; rectangular in plan, it occupies the height of both floors and is closed by a Bohemian vault. The castle was once surrounded by a lavish French Baroque garden, of which only a late-18th-century plan survives, and the park has been repeatedly devastated.
