= Oršić Manor (Jakovlje) =

Historic building in Zaprešić, Croatia

Oršić Manor in Jakovlje
- Dvorac Oršić (Croatian)
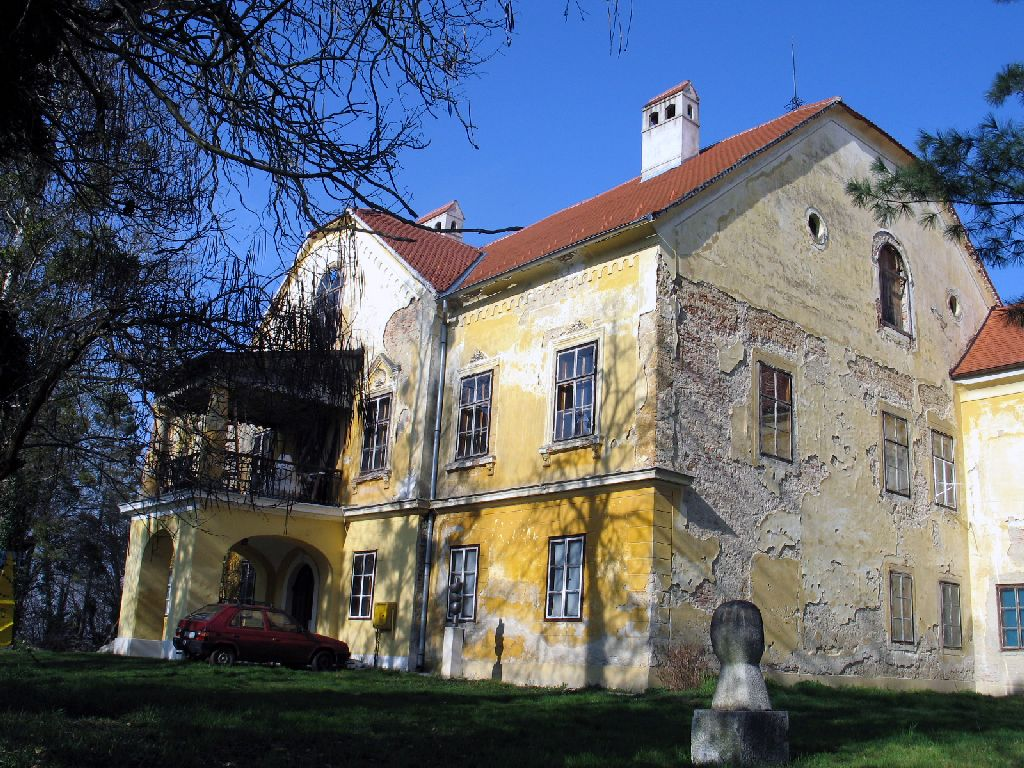
- The manor before the restoration completed in 2026
- Interactive map of Oršić Manor in Jakovlje
- 45°56′46.68″N 15°51′2.52″E
- Location: Jakovlje, Croatia

History
- Built: second half of the 18th century

Site notes
- Architectural style: Neo-Baroque

Cultural Good of Croatia
- Official name: Dvorac Oršić
- Type: Protected cultural good
- Reference no.: Z-2440

Oršić Manor (Croatian: Dvorac Oršić), also known as Sixta Manor or Jakovlje Manor (Croatian: Dvorac Jakovlje), is a neo-Baroque manor in Jakovlje, Zagreb County, Croatia. It lies near the city of Zaprešić, in the Hrvatsko Zagorje region northwest of Zagreb. The manor now serves as an artists' residence with studios and a sculpture park, and is protected as a cultural good of the Republic of Croatia.

== History ==
The manor originated from the addition of two wings to a Baroque curia in the middle of the second half of the 18th century, and took on its present appearance through numerous alterations during the second half of the 19th century, particularly after the earthquake of 1880. It was built by the noble Oršić family, remodelled by the Josipović family during the 19th century, and passed to the Sixta family in the early 20th century, who held it until the end of the Second World War, when it was confiscated.

With the arrival of artists in the 1970s, and the founding of a sculpture park with the first international sculpture colony in 1993, the manor took on a new role as a place of artistic activity. Its northern wing was removed in 2010 owing to structural instability, and the building was heavily damaged in the 2020 Zagreb earthquake. Structural repairs were carried out in 2022 and 2023, followed by a full restoration, with works continuing until 2026.

== Architecture ==
The manor stands on elevated ground in the centre of Jakovlje, approached by an avenue of horse chestnuts. It was built in the second half of the 18th century as a single-storey curia; in the early 19th century it was extended with two lateral wings, and in the later 19th century it received new façade decoration and the altana of its main front. It was then that the dominant imperial-type neo-Baroque staircase was created in the interior of the central wing. During the restoration, wall paintings from the second half of the 18th century were uncovered in the central upper-floor room, depicting Chinese architecture and urban and maritime scenes.

The grounds around the manor were laid out and divided into several sections. The approach avenue led through a farm area with laterally placed outbuildings to a park in front of the manor, while geometrically arranged vegetable gardens lay to its rear.
