= Krsto II Oršić =

Croatian nobleman and soldier (1718–1782)

- Count
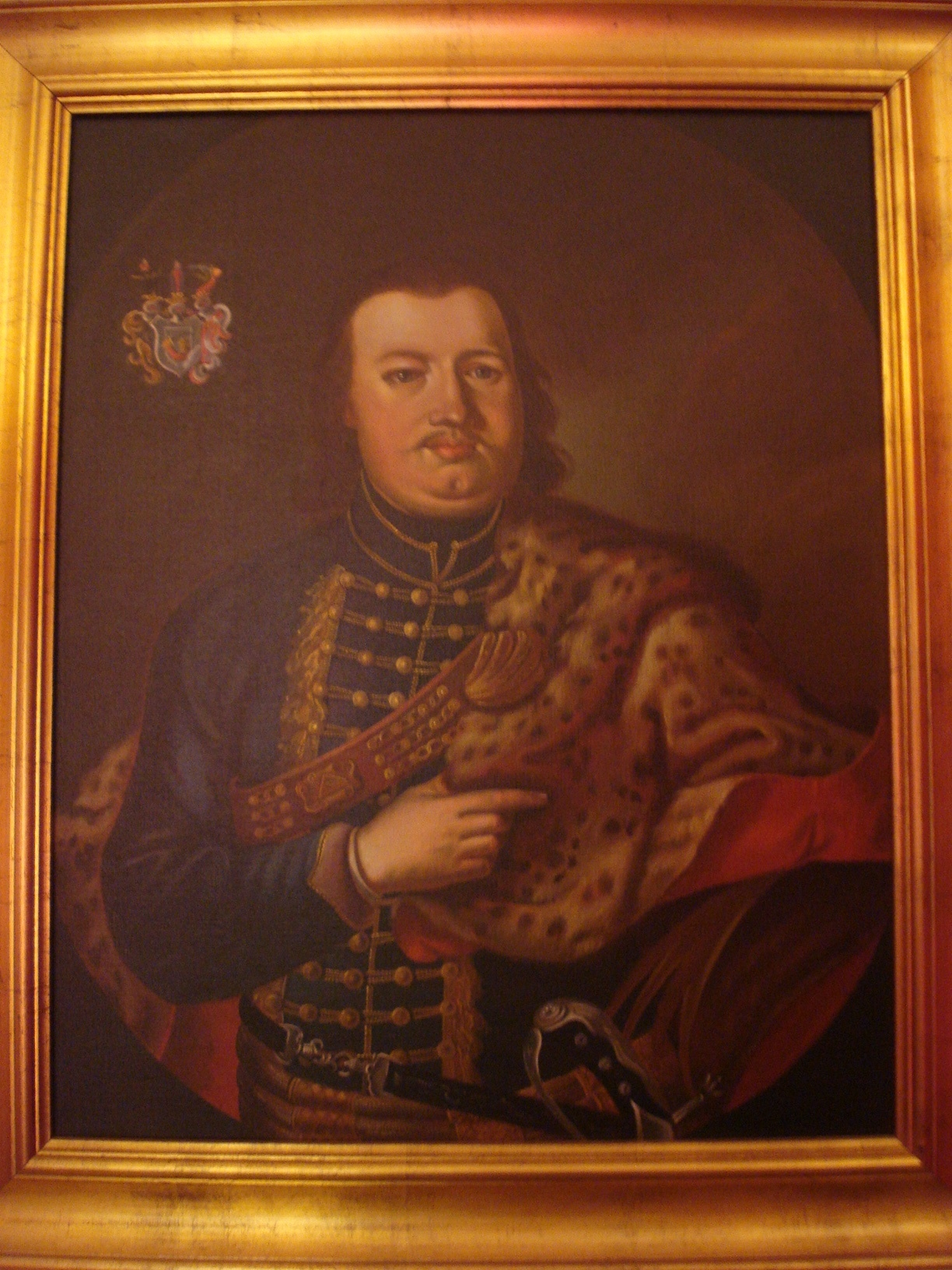
- Portrait of Krsto II Oršić in Oršić Castle in Gornja Stubica
- Born: 1718; Gornja Stubica
- Died: 1782 (aged 63–64); Zagreb
- Family: House of Oršić
- Wife: Josipa Oršić née Zichy
- Issue: Adam Oršić, Franjo Oršić
- Father: Bernard III Oršić
- Mother: Ana Oršić née Patačić

Count Krsto II Oršić Slavetićki (English: Christopher II Orshich of Slavetić), (1718–1782) was a Croatian nobleman and high-ranking officer in the Habsburg monarchy imperial army service, a member of the Oršić noble family.

== Life ==
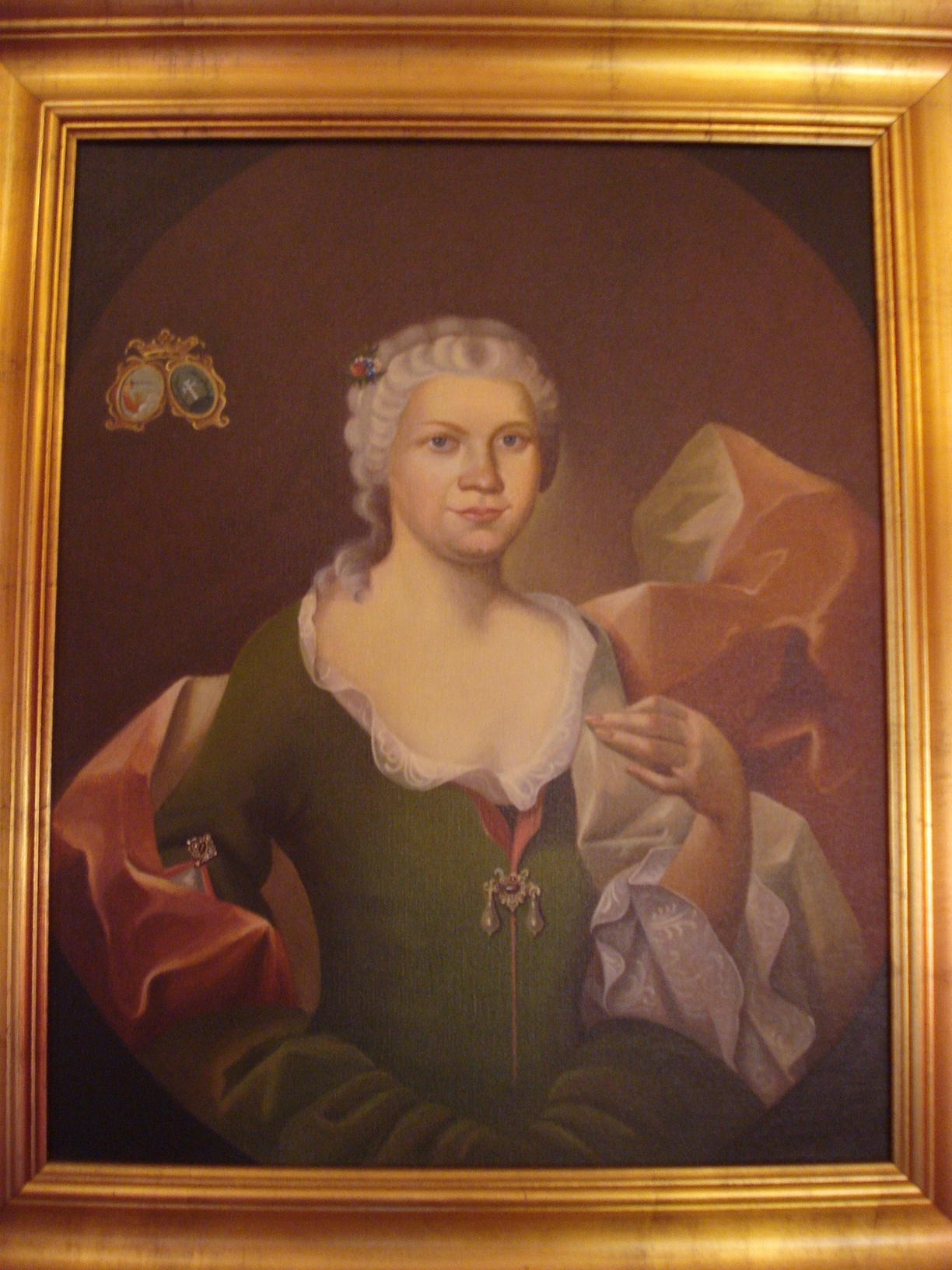
Krsto's wife, Countess Josipa Zichy

Krsto Oršić was the son of Bernard III Oršić Slavetićki and his wife Ana née Patačić. He was educated in Bologna and Vienna. In 1741 he devoted himself to military career, taking part in several wars and many battles like War of the Austrian Succession and Seven Years' War. He achieved the rank of Field Marshal.

During his lifetime, Oršić performed some other duties as well, for instance the assessor at the Croatian Parliament seat in Zagreb and grand župan of Zagreb County. In 1744, he married the Hungarian countess, Josipa (Jozefa) Zichy (1725–1778) who bore him sons Adam (1748–1820) and Franjo (1758–1807). She also published a veterinary manual in Kajkavian on livestock titled Betegujuče živine vračitel (1772, Zagreb), one of the first such manuals in Croatia.

As a descendant of a distinguished and rich noble family, he owned a large number of castles, palaces and estates in Croatia, e.g. Gornja Stubica Castle, Gornja Bistra Castle at Zaprešić, Slavetić Castle at Jastrebarsko, Jurketinec Castle at Varaždin, castle in Severin na Kupi and palaces in Zagreb and Varaždin. On the site of a previous fortress from the Middle Ages in Gornja Stubica, he had a brand new baroque castle built in 1756. Between 1770 and 1775 he had another baroque castle constructed on his Gornja Bistra estate. Around 1780, he also had built another three storey palace with a mansard roof in Zagreb, at today's Opatička 14 street.

After he retired from the army, Krsto Oršić withdrew with his wife Josipa to his newly built Gornja Bistra castle, where they spent their last years together. Josipa soon died (in 1778 in neighbouring Oroslavje) and Krsto lived alone until his death in Zagreb in 1782.

== See also ==
- Oršić Castle in Gornja Stubica
- List of noble families of Croatia
