= Oršić Manor (Gornja Stubica) =

Coordinates: 45.984°N 16.016°E

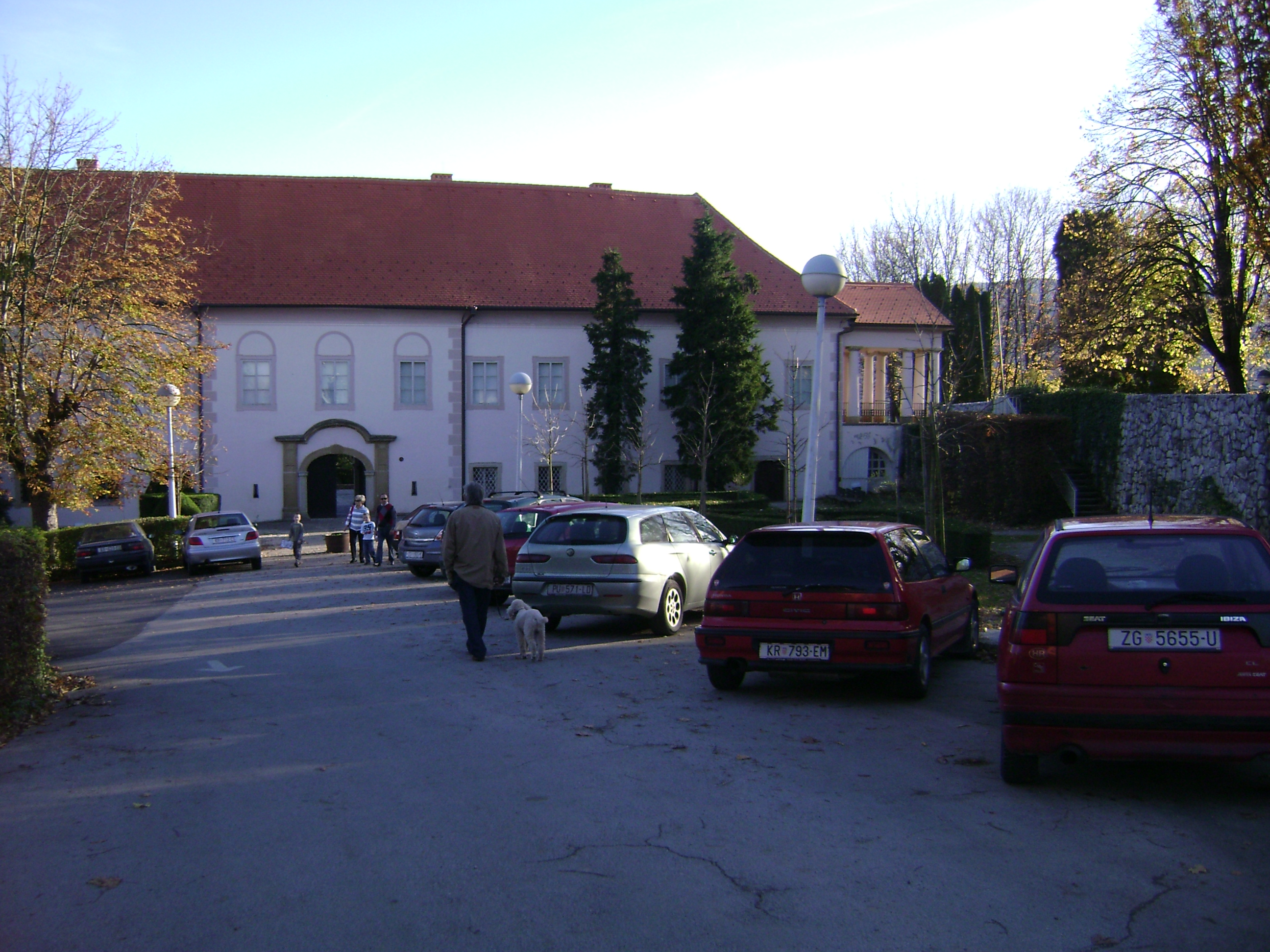
Front view of Oršić Castle

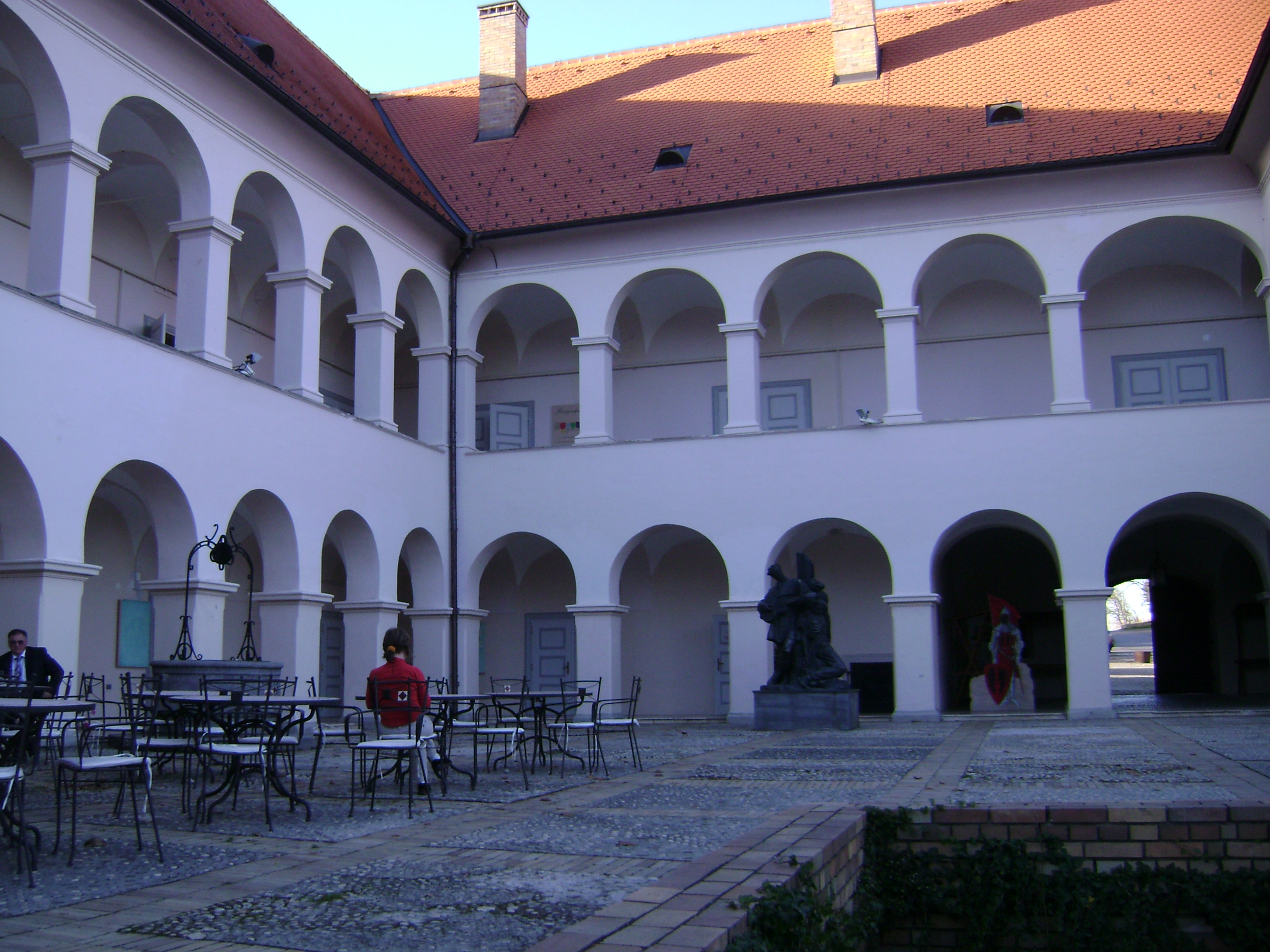
Backyard view of Oršić Castle

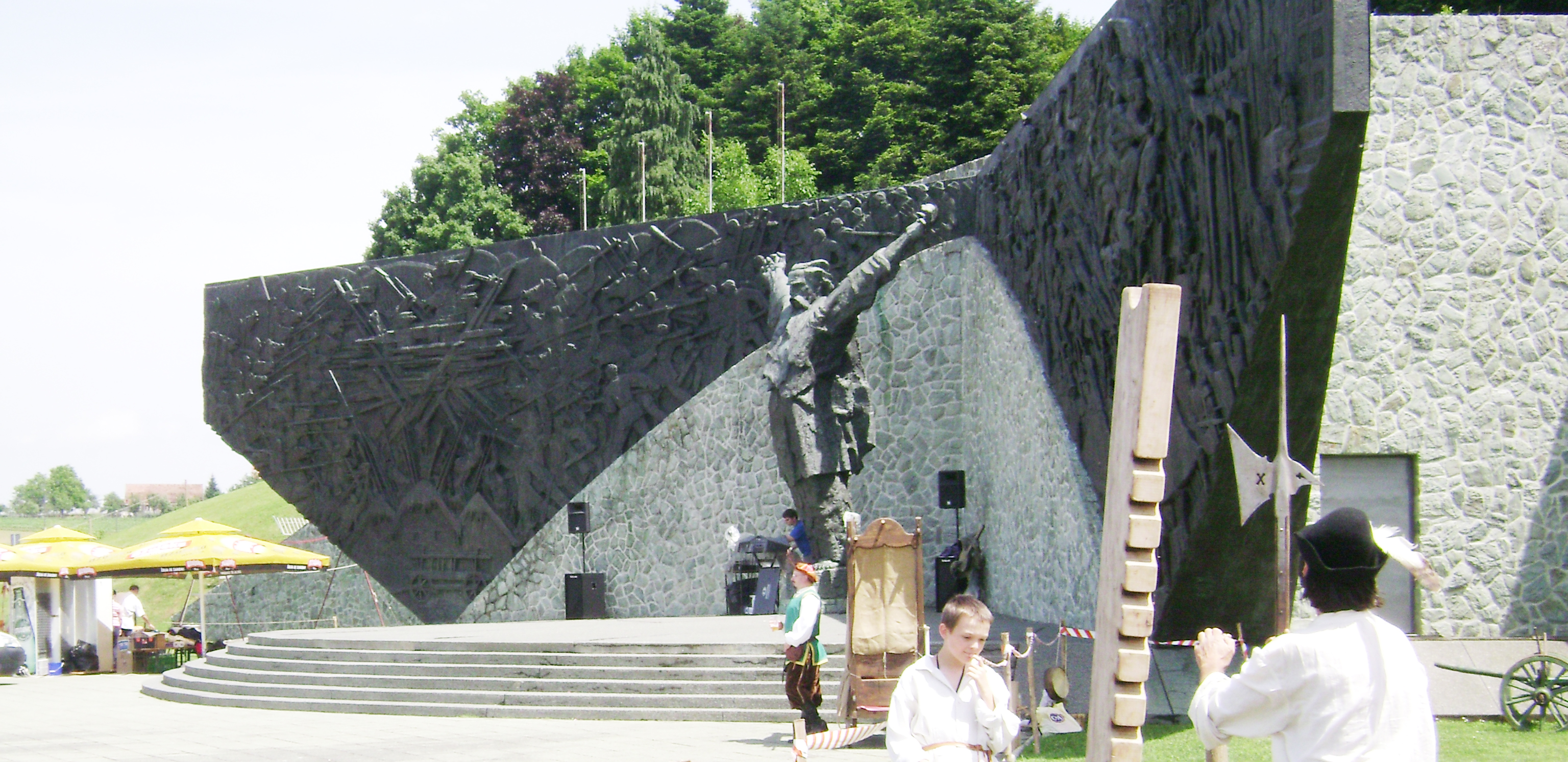
Peasants' revolt monument near Oršić Castle

Oršić Castle (Croatian pronunciation: [ǒːrʃit͡ɕ]) is a baroque castle in the Municipality of Gornja Stubica, Krapina-Zagorje County, northwestern Croatia.

== History ==
It was built in 1756 by Croatian count Krsto Oršić (1718–1782) on the site of a previous fortress from the Middle Ages and designed in an L-shaped ground plan. From the backyard side, both the wings are open in arcades that follow the line of the corridor, while the outside frontage is quite simple, with rhythmically aligned windows and a few rustic details in the corners.

After a large earthquake in the 19th century, a classicist porch with a tympanum and Doric columns was added to the castle. Inside there is a well-preserved chapel with illusionist murals and an illustrated baroque altar.

Besides this castle, the Oršić family owned a large number of other castles, palaces and estates in Croatia, among which the most significant were castles Gornja Bistra at Zaprešić, Slavetić at Jastrebarsko, Jurketinec at Varaždin and palaces in Zagreb and Varaždin.

The castle was the feudal residence of the Oršić family, until the last members relocated in 1924. A primary school was situated in a part of the castle for some time after that, and a local peasant's cooperative society as well. At the end of the sixties and the beginning of the seventies, the castle was thoroughly renewed and transformed into a Museum of the Peasants' revolt, which deals with a tragic event that occurred in 1573 in this area.

Around the castle there is a park with a huge monument dedicated to the Peasants' revolt and to its leader Matija Gubec, made by a prominent Croatian sculptor Antun Augustinčić.

== See also ==
- List of castles in Croatia
- Croatian-Slovenian peasant revolt
- Museum
- Antun Augustinčić
- Matija Gubec
- Zaprešić - Oršić family mansion
- Varaždin - Erdödy-Oršić palace
