= Oršić family =

Croatian noble family

Oršić
- Country: Kingdom of Croatia (under Habsburgs)
- Founded: 15th century (1420)
- Titles: Baron (since 1675); Count (since 1744)
- Estates: of Slavetić, Gornja Stubica, Gornja Bistra, Jurketinec, Jakovlje, Severin na Kupi etc.

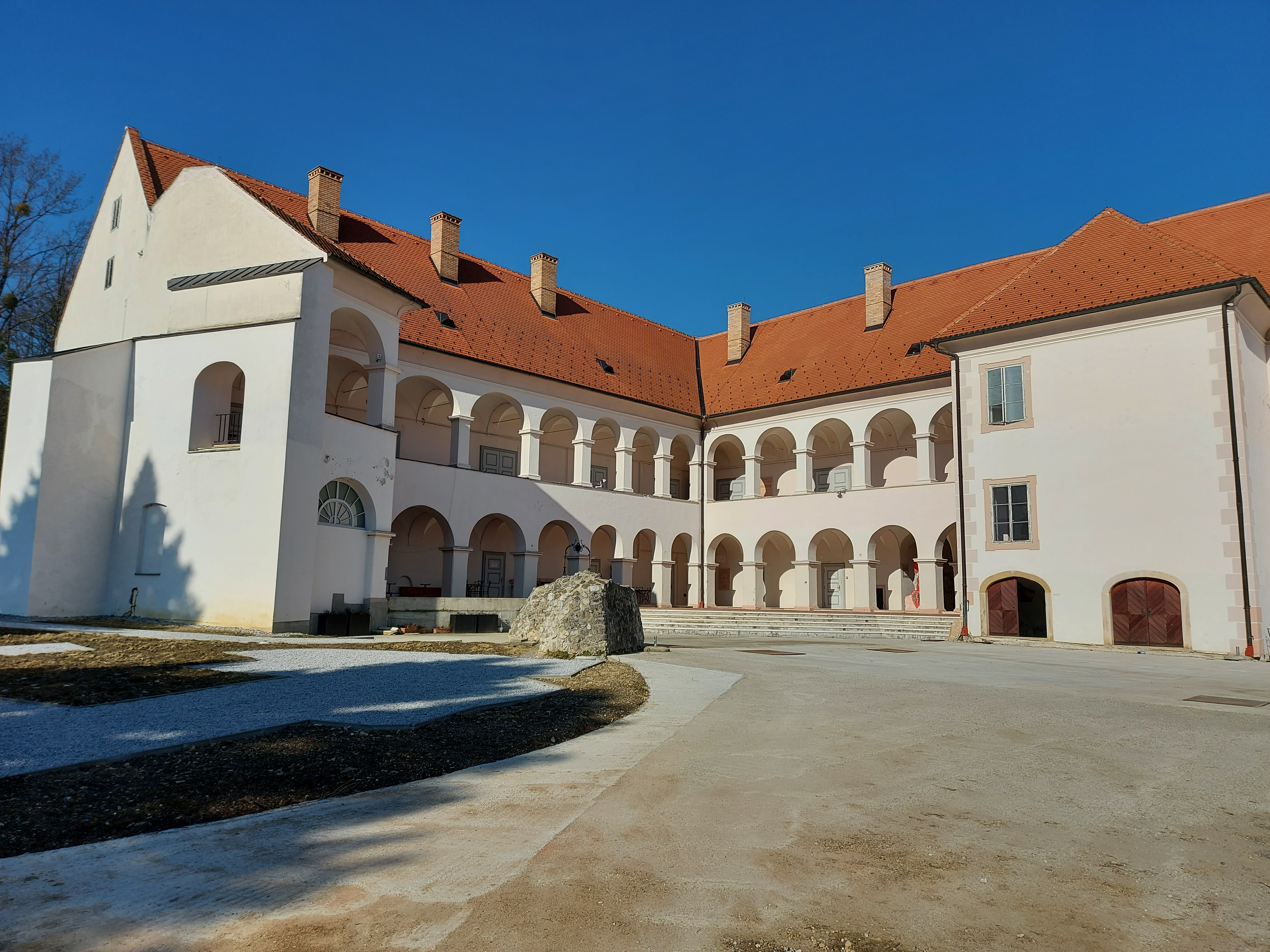
Oršić Castle in Gornja Stubica

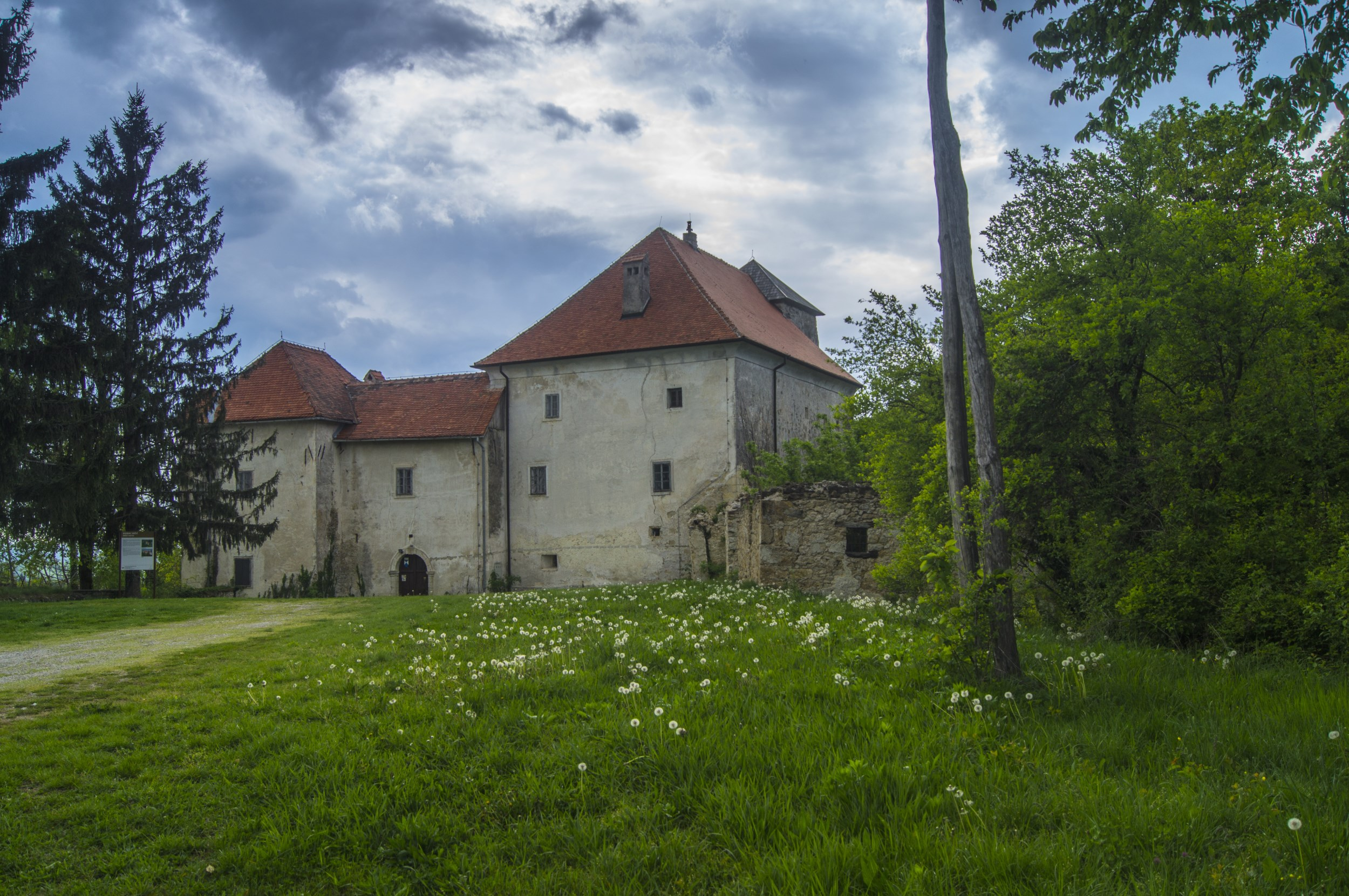
Slavetić castle, owned by Oršić family

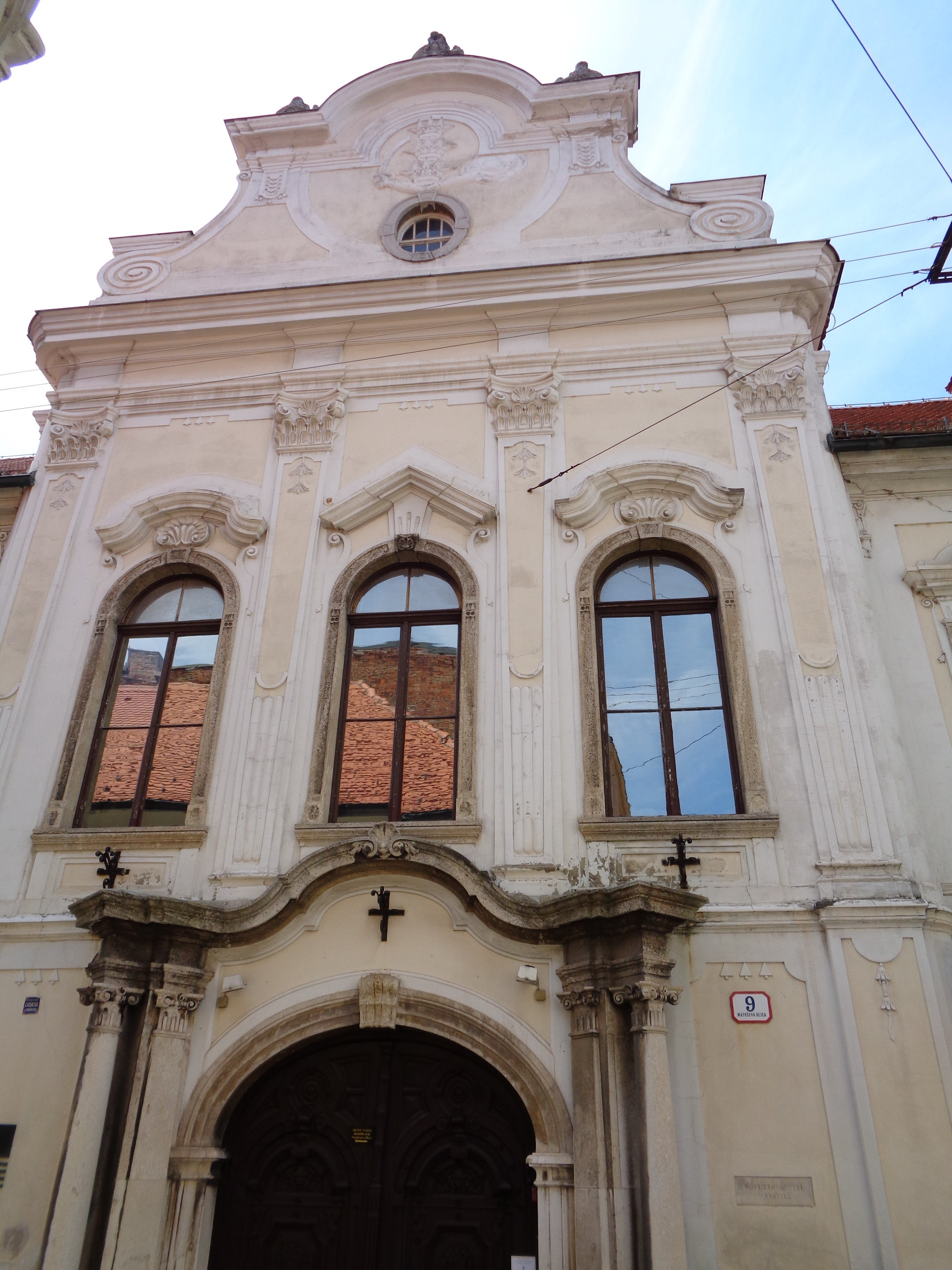
A palace in Zagreb owned by the Oršić family in the 18th and 19th century

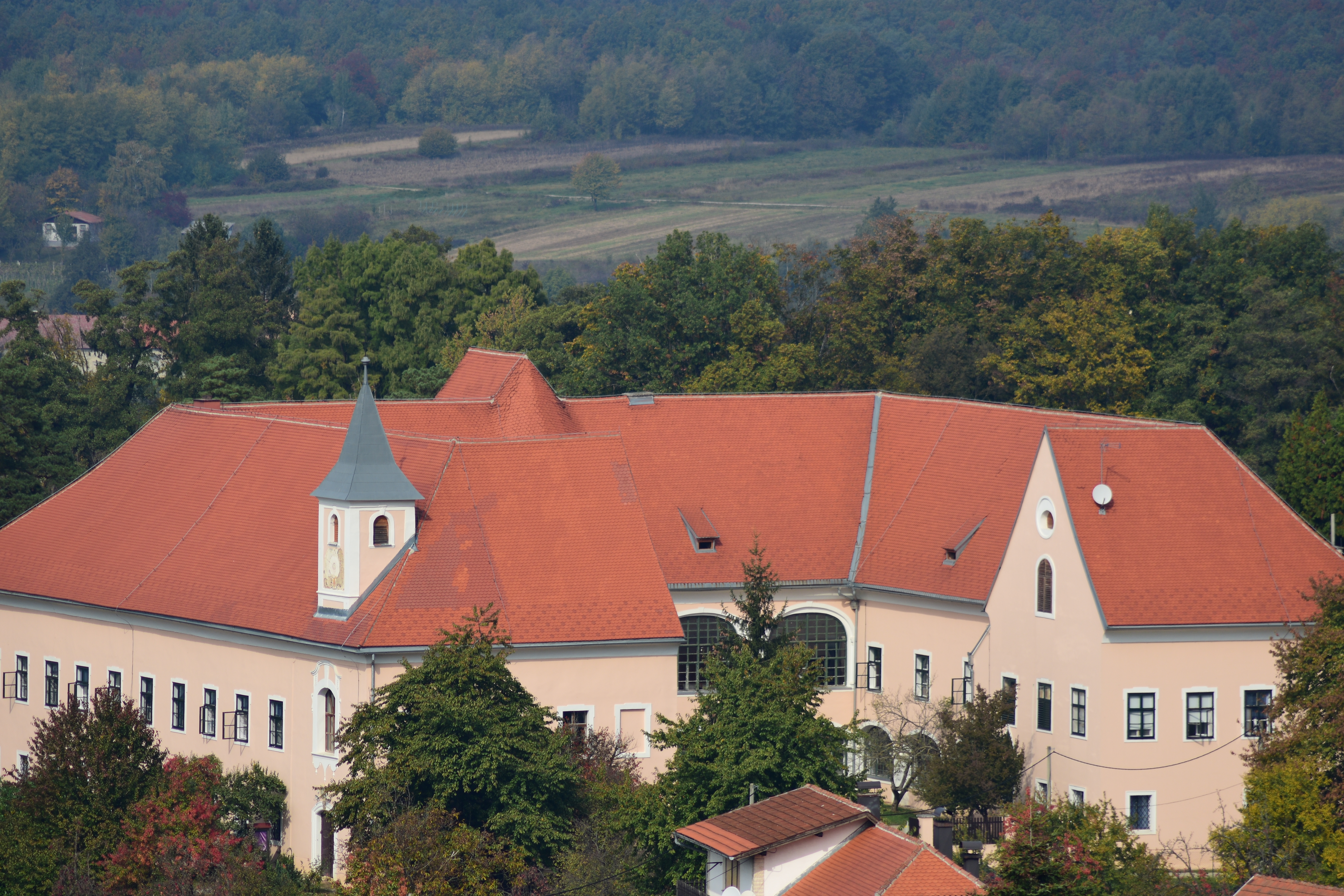
Oršić castle in Gornja Bistra

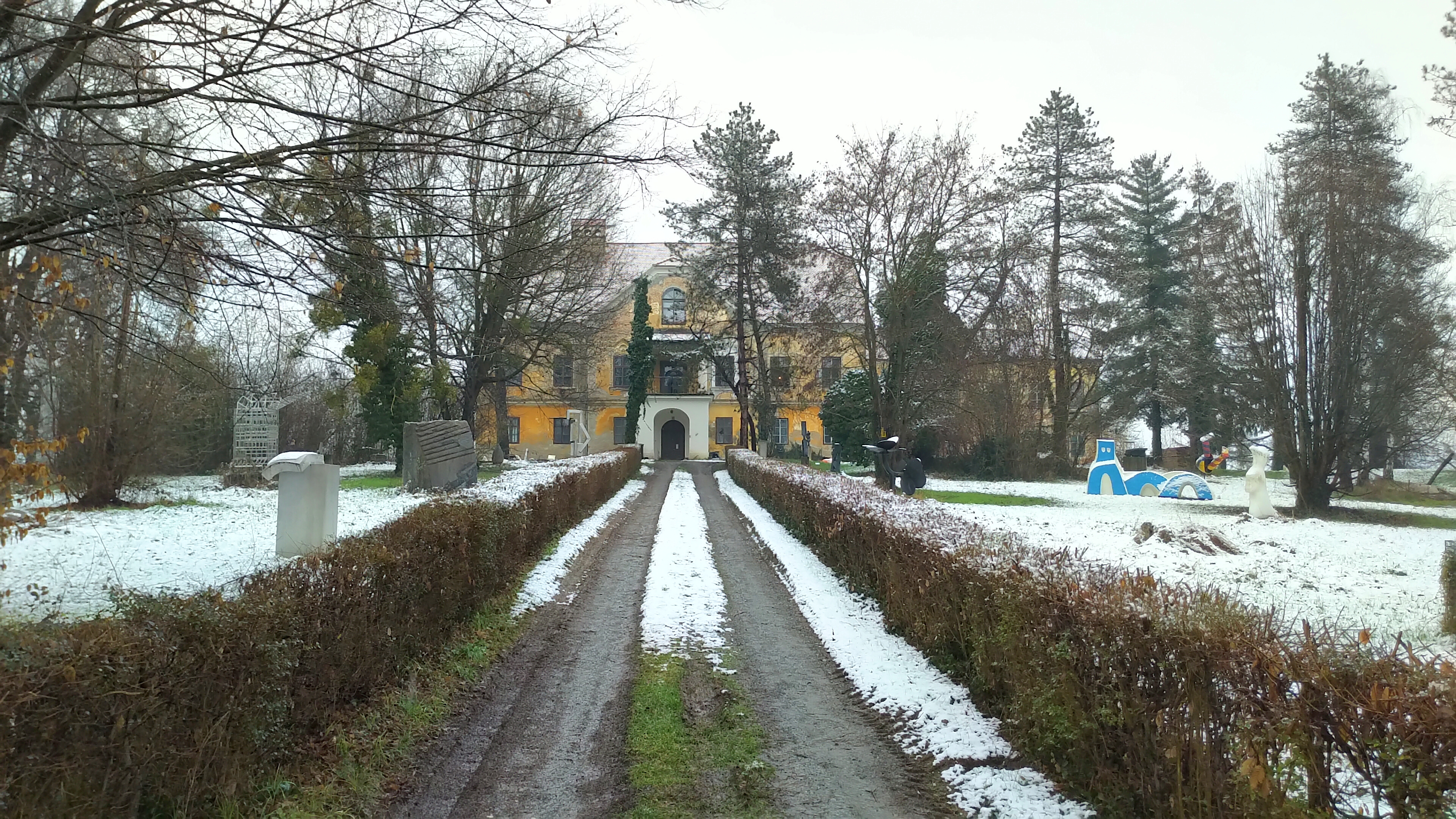
Oršić Castle in Jakovlje

The Oršić family (Orssich, Croatian pronunciation: [ǒːrʃit͡ɕ]) is an old Croatian noble family, thought to have descended from the Croatian noble clan of Lapčan and Karinjan, remarkable in the Kingdom of Croatia in personal union with Hungary and within the Habsburg Monarchy respectively, whose notable members were politicians, senior military officers, župans or other state officials, as well as cultural workers and patrons.

== Family history ==
The first written mention of the Oršić family name appeared in a document from Knin in 1420. The members of the family were mentioned to have originated from the area of Unac River, a tributary of Una, in the medieval Croatian county of Pset. In another document from 1449, they are quoted as "Oršićs from Udrinić" (present-day Drinić, a village in the Bosanski Petrovac Municipality, western Bosnia and Herzegovina).

In the middle of the 15th century (between 1464 and 1472), the Oršićs moved to the northwest, due to the fall of the Kingdom of Bosnia and increasing danger of Ottoman Turks' territorial advancement. They settled in Gorička County (Croatian: Gorička županija), near present-day Karlovac, and acquired some smaller estates (Orehovac, Dol, Lipovac). In 1487, king Matija Korvin granted them Slavetić estate, northwest of Jastrebarsko, and since then they carried the name Orssichs of Slavetich (Croatian: Oršići Slavetićki). They had a new castle built there, which still exists today. Later they gained other estates like Gornja Stubica, Gornja Bistra and Jurketinec (near Varaždin).

In the 17th century the whole family property was in hands of a single man, Matija (Matthew) (c. 1600–1680), who was a captain of the Croatian Military Frontier. With his wealth he enabled his descendants to advance further in the army, and to gain higher social status, power and reputation.

Matija's son Ivan Franjo Oršić (John Francis; 1630–1686) achieved the rank of vice-general of the Karlovac generalate. He performed the duty of grand župan of the Modruš County as well, and in 1675 he was given the title of hereditary baron. Much later, in 1744, his great-grandson Krsto II (1718–1782), a vice field marshal (German: Untermarschall, abbr. FML) of the Habsburg monarchy imperial army, grand župan of the Zagreb County and the assessor of the Tabula Banalis, Ban's (viceroy's) Supreme Court, was given the hereditary title of Count, for his military merits.

Adam Oršić (1748–1820), the eldest son of Krsto, performed the duty of imperial and royal chamberlain and was a chronicler of the Oršić family. By the end of his life he wrote a large genealogy and history book of his own family. His son Juraj (George) (1780–1847) was a politician, one of the leading supporters of Illyrian movement and Croatian national revival, who advocated the introduction of Croatian (instead of Latin) as official into Croatian institutions.

All further members of the family originate from Ivan Nepomuk (1752–1792).

== Gallery ==
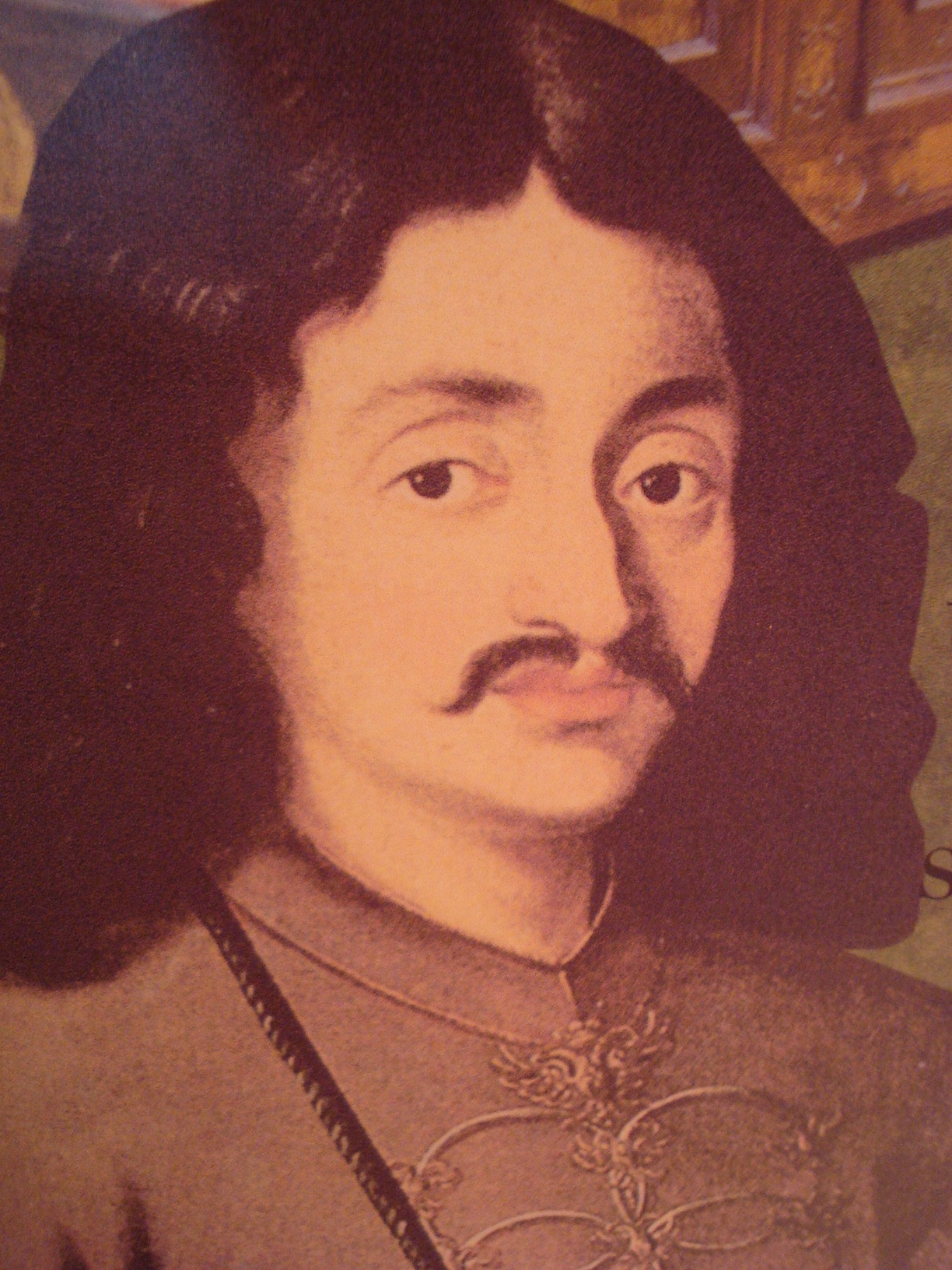
Baron Antun Oršić (1670–1706),
son of Ivan Franjo and
grandfather of Krsto II

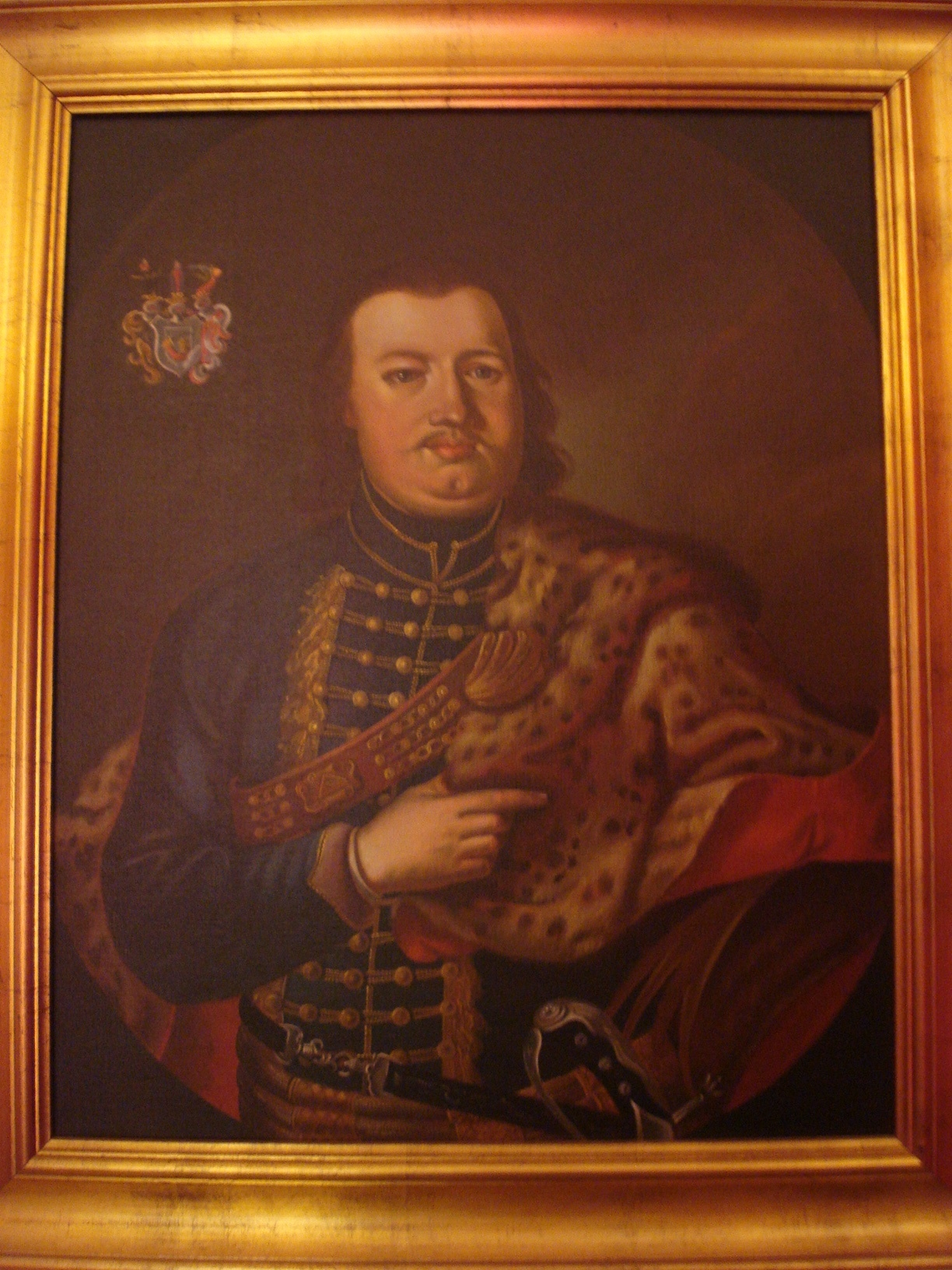
Count Krsto II Oršić (1718–1782),
grandson of Antun

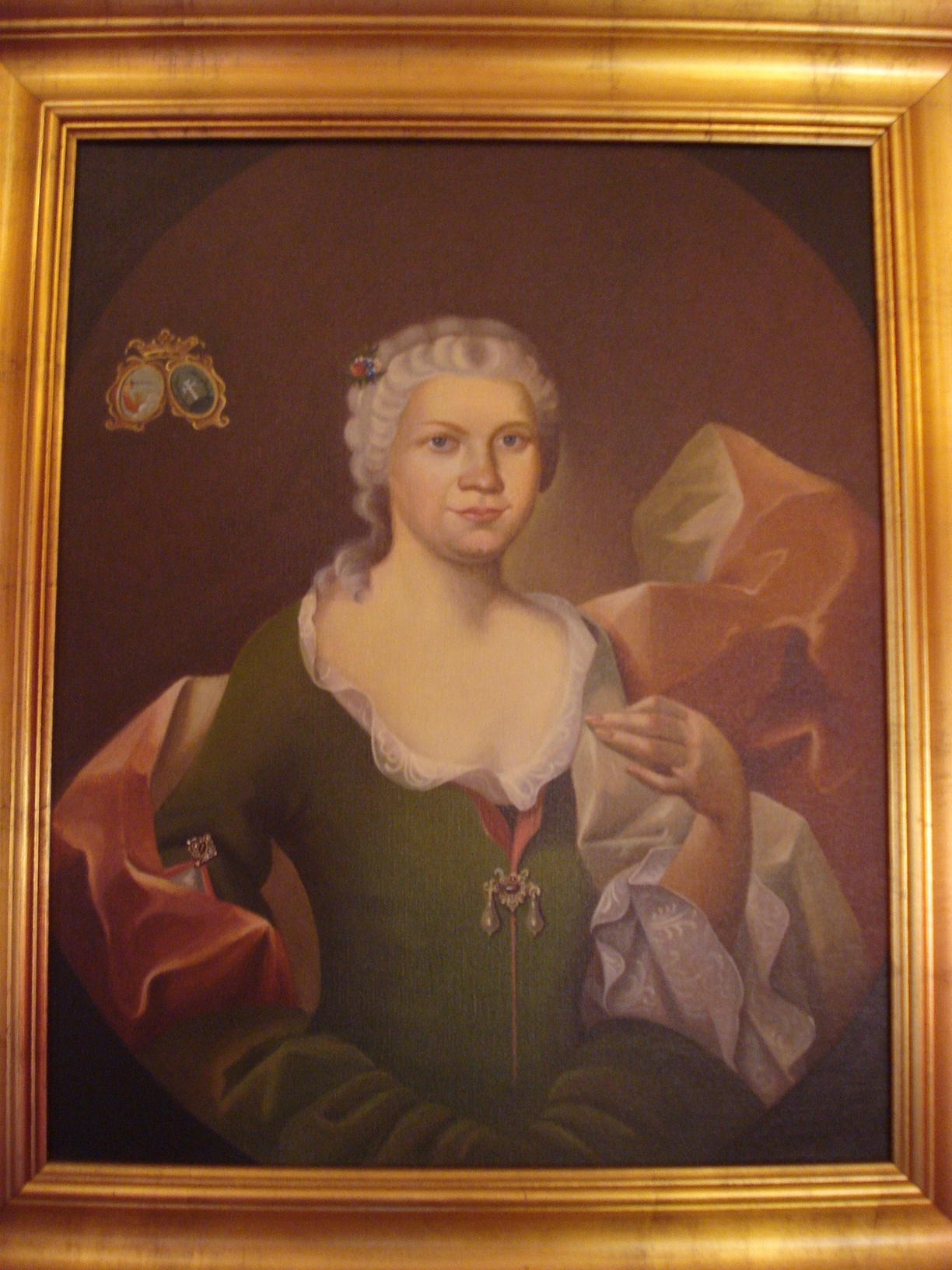
Countess Josephine Oršić, born Countess Zichy (1725-1778)

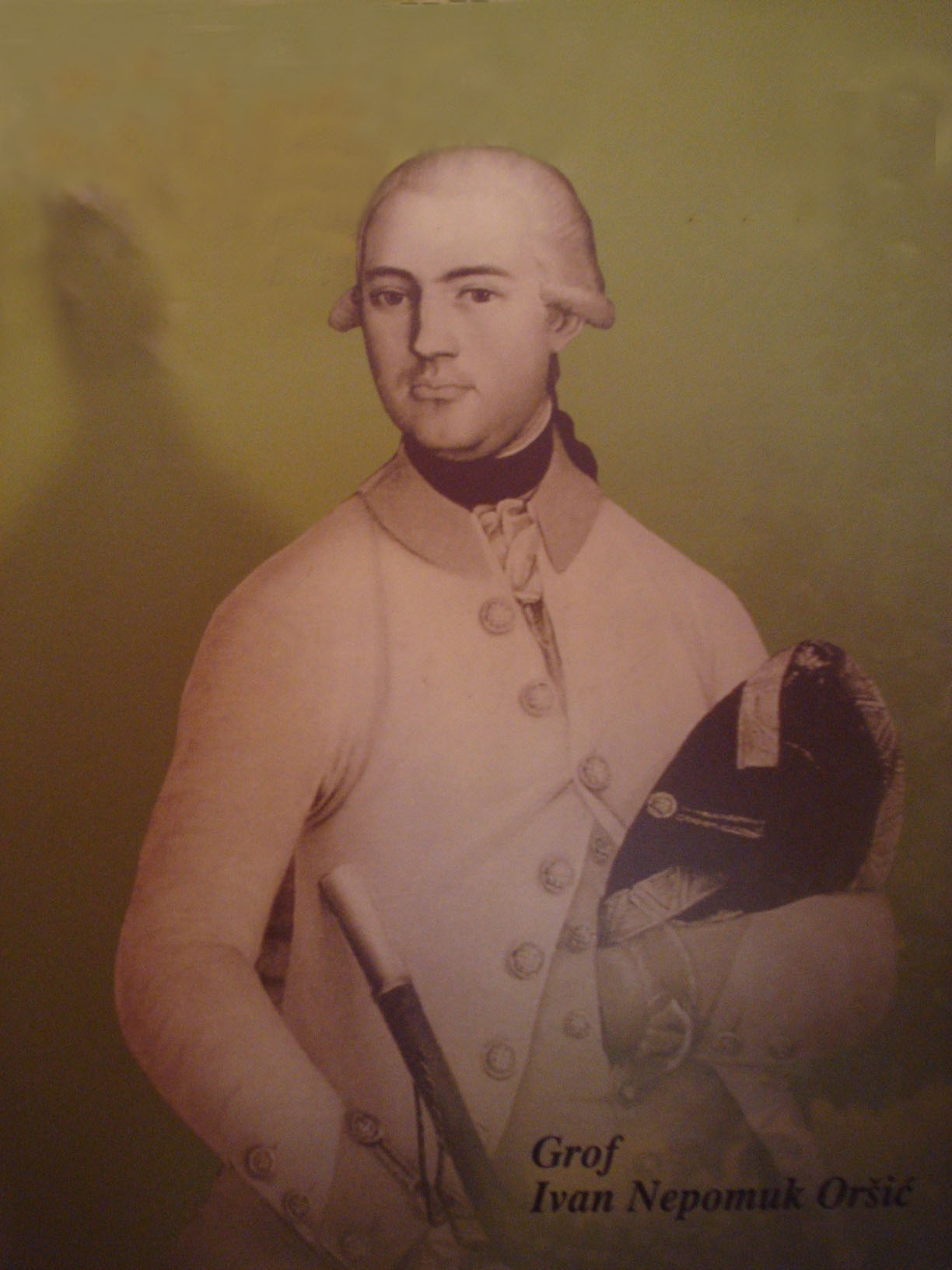
Count Ivan Nepomuk Oršić (1753–1792),
son of Krsto II

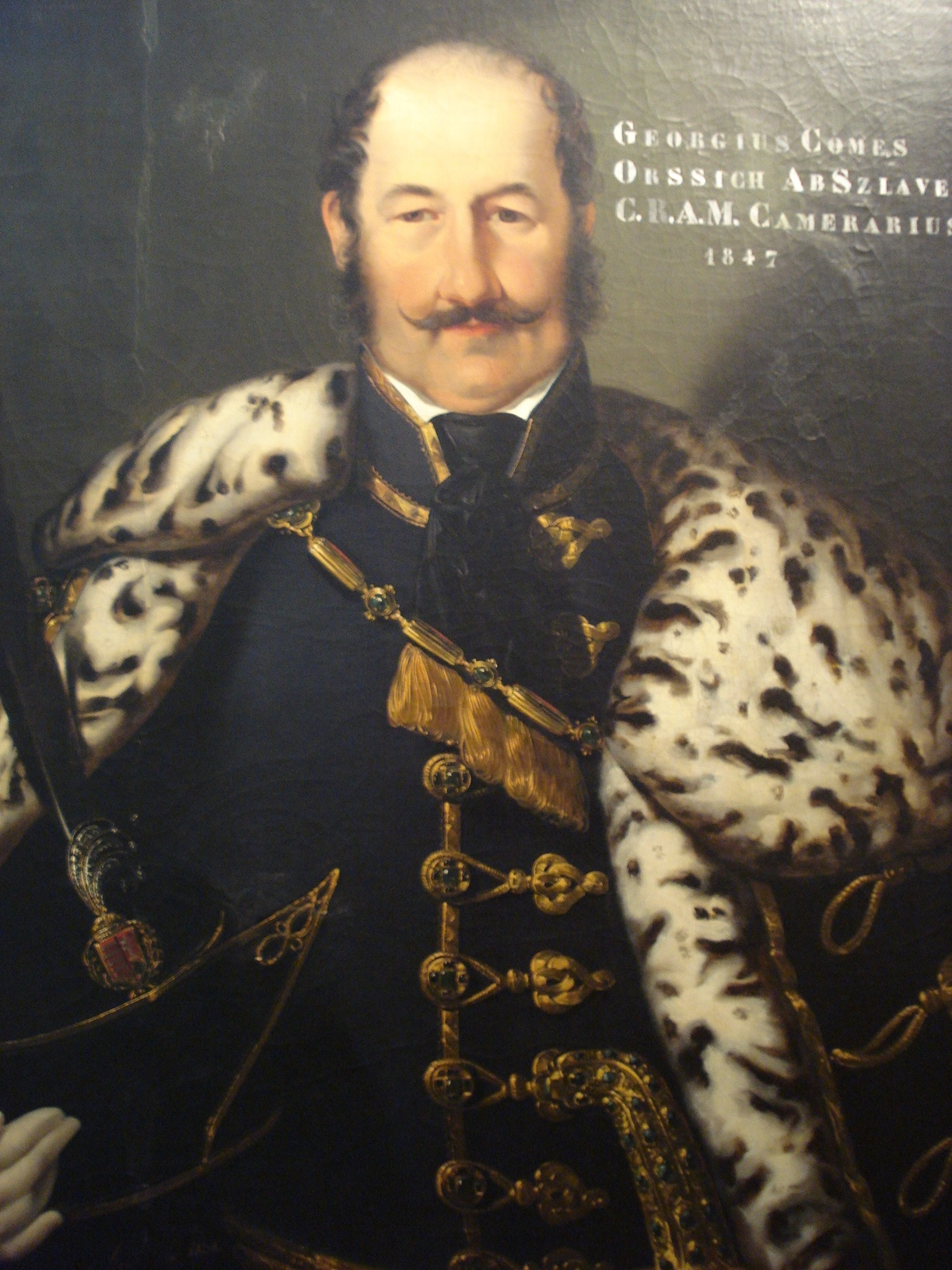
Count Juraj Oršić (1780–1847),
grandson of Krsto II

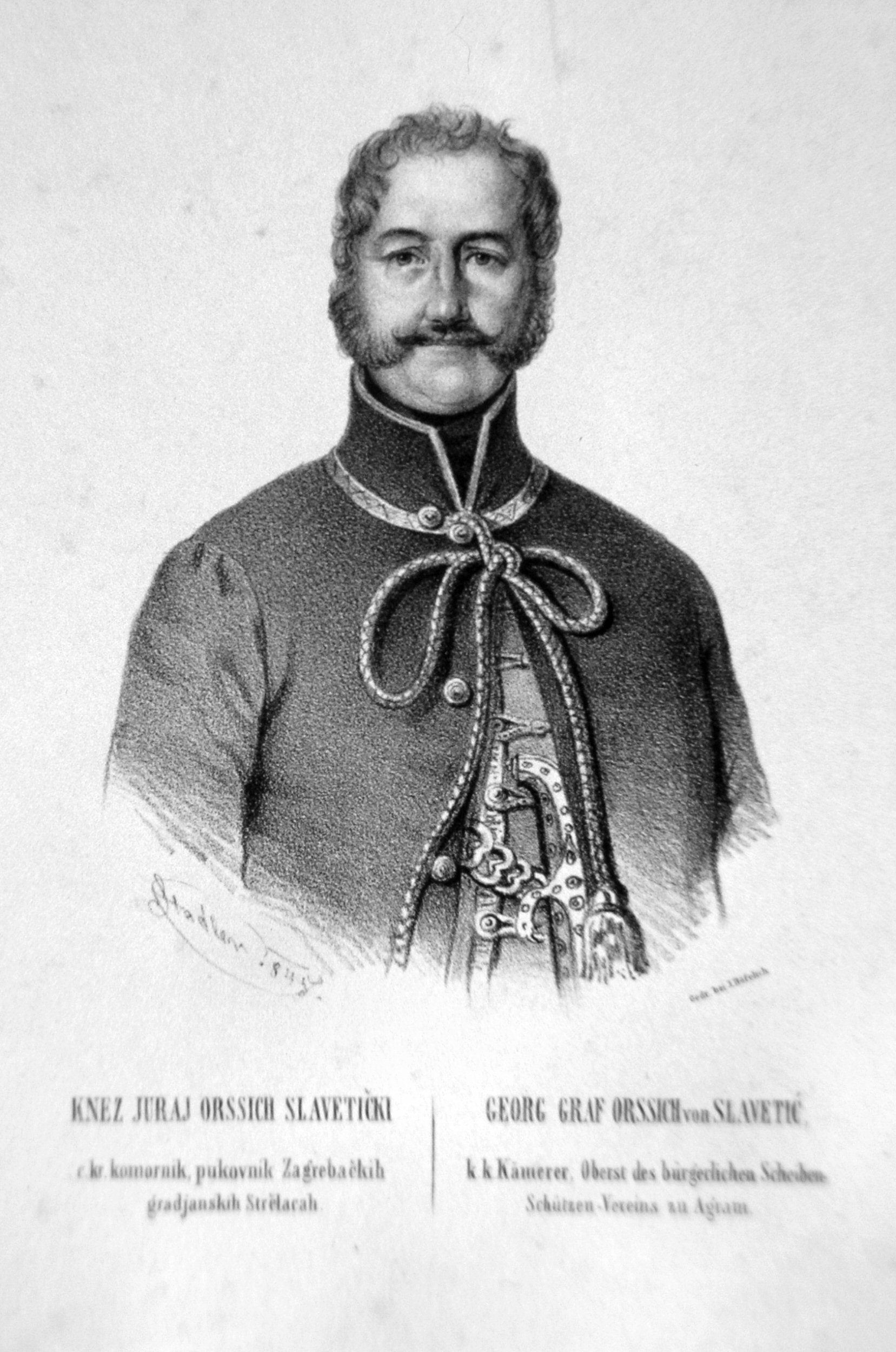
Another picture of Count Juraj (Georg) Oršić of Slavetić (1780-1847)

== See also ==
- History of Croatia
- Kingdom of Croatia (Habsburg)
- Military Frontier
