= Gornja Bistra =

- Village
- Location within Croatia
- Coordinates: 45°55′N 15°54′E
- Country: Croatia
- County: Zagreb County
- Municipality: Bistra

Area
  - Total: 20.2 km^{2} (7.8 sq mi)

Population (2021)
  - Total: 1,671
  - Density: 82.7/km^{2} (214/sq mi)
- Time zone: UTC+1 (CET)
  - Summer (DST): UTC+2 (CEST)

Gornja Bistra is a village in Croatia. It is located on the northern slopes of the Medvednica, underneath the ski slopes where the Snow Queen Trophy race is held. The area of the settlement is 20.25 km^{2}. According to the 2021 census, 1,671 inhabitants live in Gornja Bistra.

== Literature ==
- Obad Šćitaroci, Mladen; Bojanić Obad Šćitaroci, Bojana; Dundović, Boris (2013). "Manors and Gardens in Northern Croatia in the Age of Historicism" (PDF). Centropa. pp. 175–186. ISSN 1532-5563. Archived from the original (PDF) on 2025-05-05.
