= Ozalj Castle =

- Ozalj; Croatia
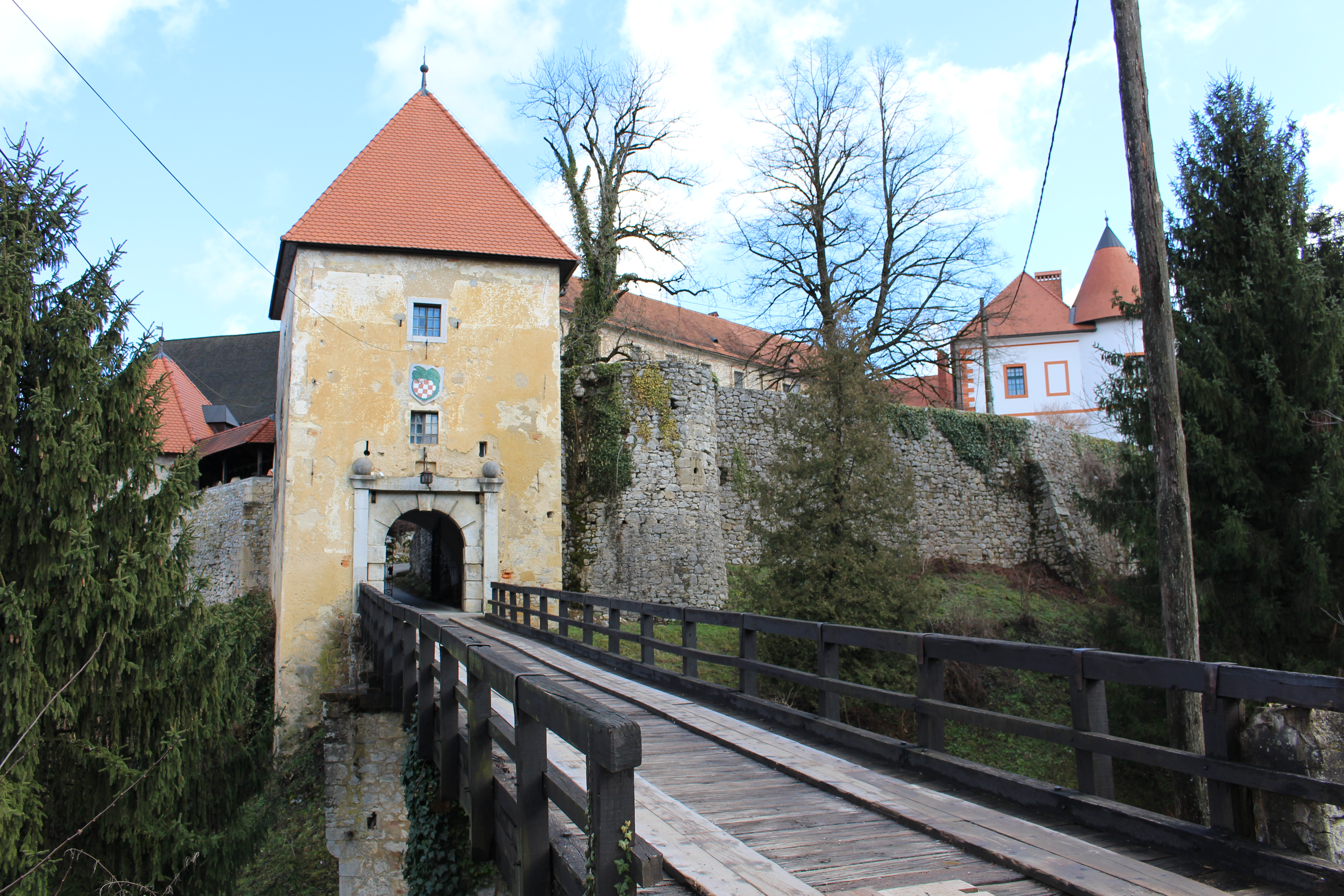
- Ozalj Castle

Site information
- Type: Castle
- Owner: Brethren of the Croatian Dragon
- Controlled by: Babonić family Frankopan family Zrinski family Perlas family Batthyány; Thurn und Taxis; Brethren of the Croatian Dragon

Location
- Location within Croatia
- Coordinates: 45.614398°N 15.47096°E

Site history
- Materials: Limestone

Cultural Good of Croatia
- Type: Protected cultural good
- Reference no.: Z-286

Ozalj Castle (Croatian: Stari grad Ozalj or Gradina Ozalj) is a castle in the town of Ozalj, Croatia.

== Description ==
The Ozalj fortress, located on the stone cliff perched above the Kupa River, is one of the best-known fortifications of this type in Croatia. It is a very old stronghold (first mentioned in 1244) that has been converted into a castle. The popularity of this castle is because this was the joint castle of the Croatian noble families of Frankopan and Zrinski. In fact, it was the scene of the ill-fated Zrinski–Frankopan conspiracy, which significantly marked the history of Croatia. In the castle there is a museum and a library, and it is in a relatively good state of repair.

== History ==
Ozalj was mentioned on 22 February 1481 in a document freeing the citizens of Grič from tariffs in Ozalj and elsewhere.

At the Slavonian Sabor of June 1579 in Zagreb, the danger of leaving the river crossings at Sveti Jakov, Luka and Rečica unguarded was noted, so for their fortification the Sabor allocated workers from the feudal estates of Ozalj, Jastrebarsko, Steničnjak, Završje, Slavetić, Turanj (Sveta Jana) and Kaptol Zagrebački.

During the fortification of Karlovac in 1588, Dubovac was part of its supply chain, being counted together with Dubovac, Novigrad, Bosiljevo and Ribnik. Ozalj owed the same as all of these four. Each owed 6 carts of timber, and although there were complaints about the conduct of the soldiers stationed in Karlovac, the order was complied with.

For the fortification of Ivanić line in 1598, Ozalj had to supply 25 labourers.

In 1605, General Veit Khisl had to defend some of his Karlovac-based German soldiers regarding an incident that occurred in 1603. He and his men were headed for the war against the Turks, and they paid for drinks from a widow in a nearby village. One of the soldiers ended up cursing at a woman, at which the widow protested with such force that up to 100 villagers attacked the soldiers, killing two and detaining many others. General Khisl protested the incident to the administrator of the Ozalj estate, Petar Baljardić, who promised recompense, but the soldiers never received it. Since Nikola Zrinski's men would not come to the Military Tribunal in Karlovac, Khisl asked Austrian Archduke Ferdinand II to compel them to.

== Gallery ==
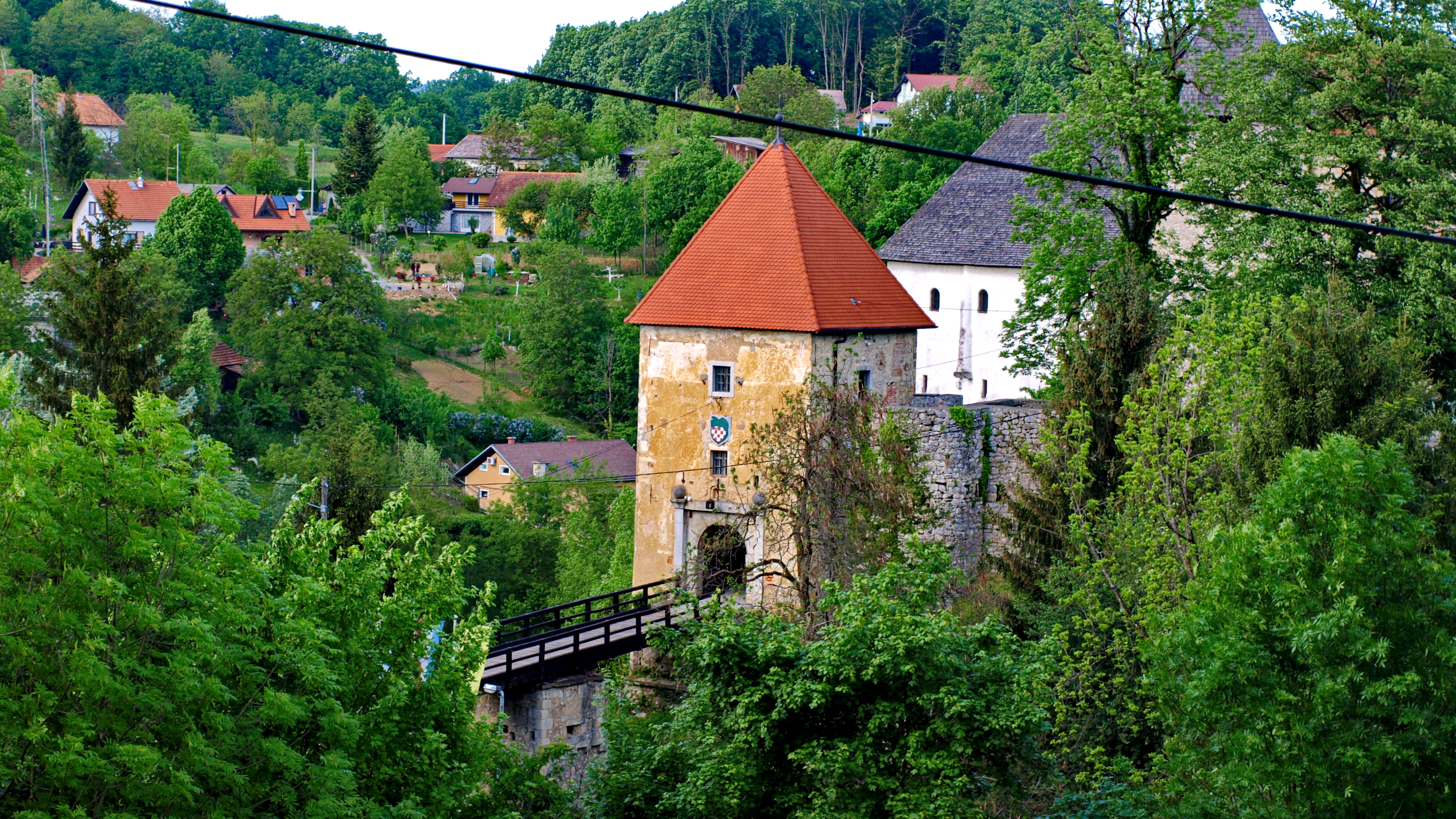
Entrance to the castle.

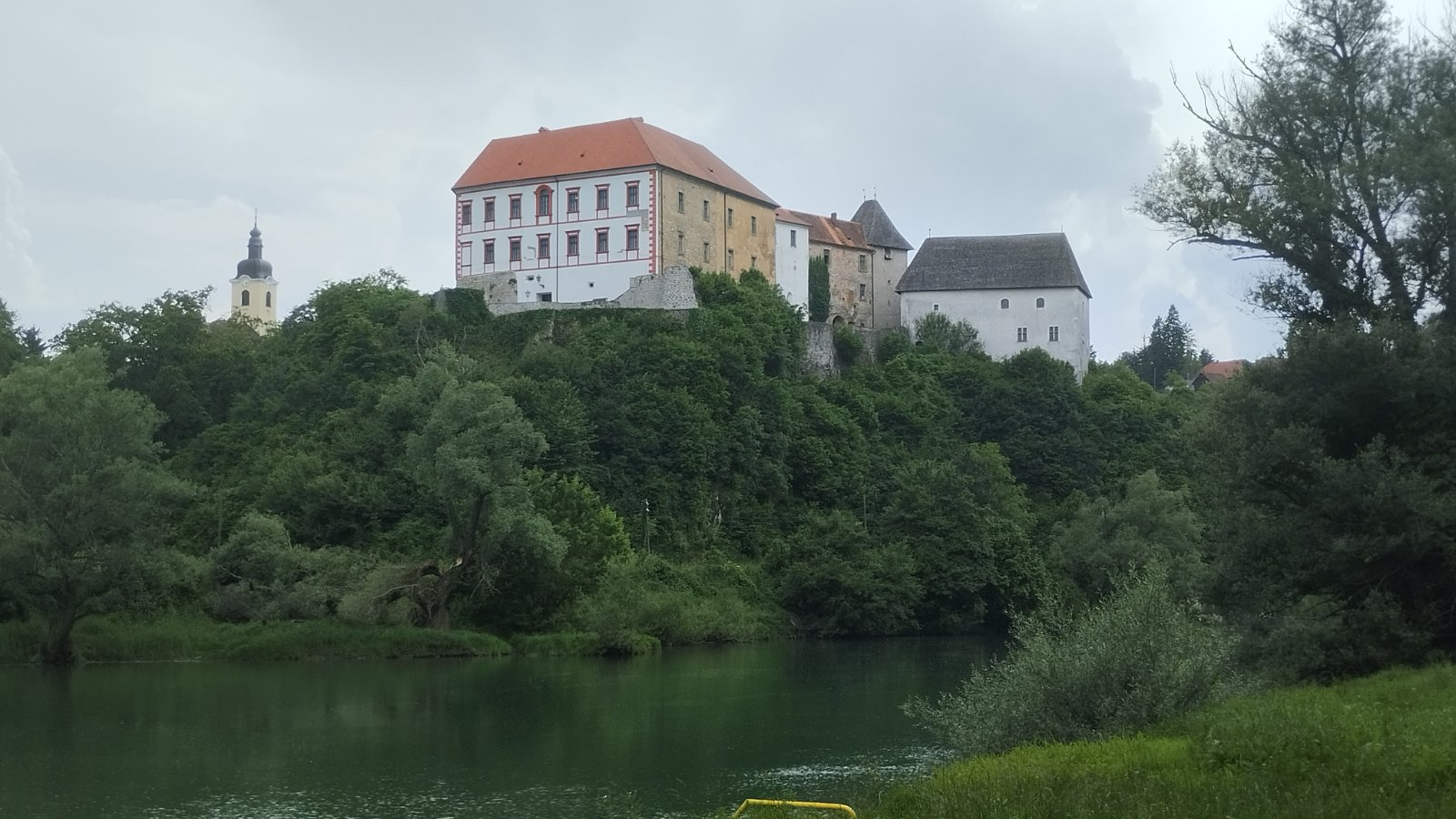
Castle from across Kupa river.

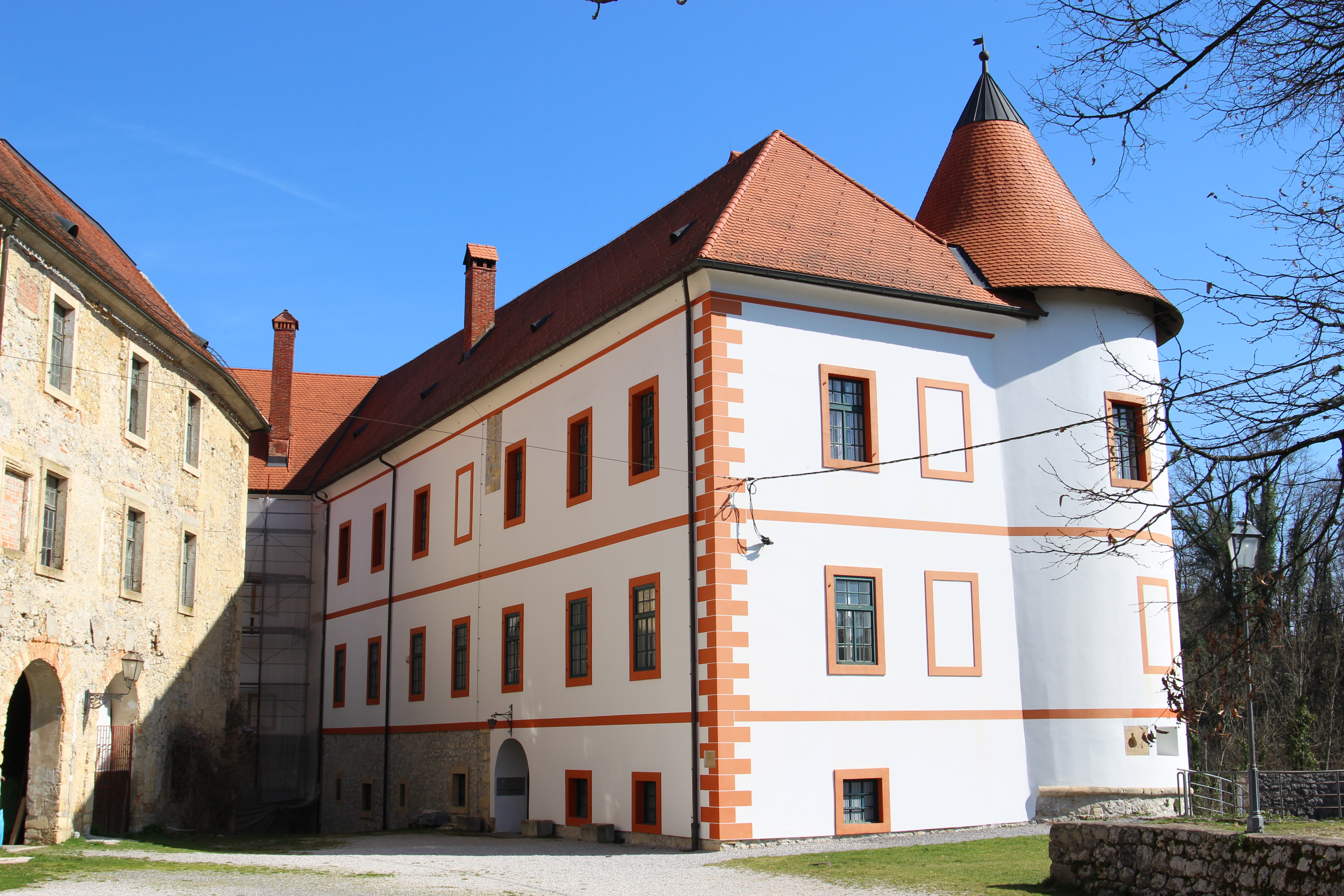
Renovated castle wing and inner courtyard

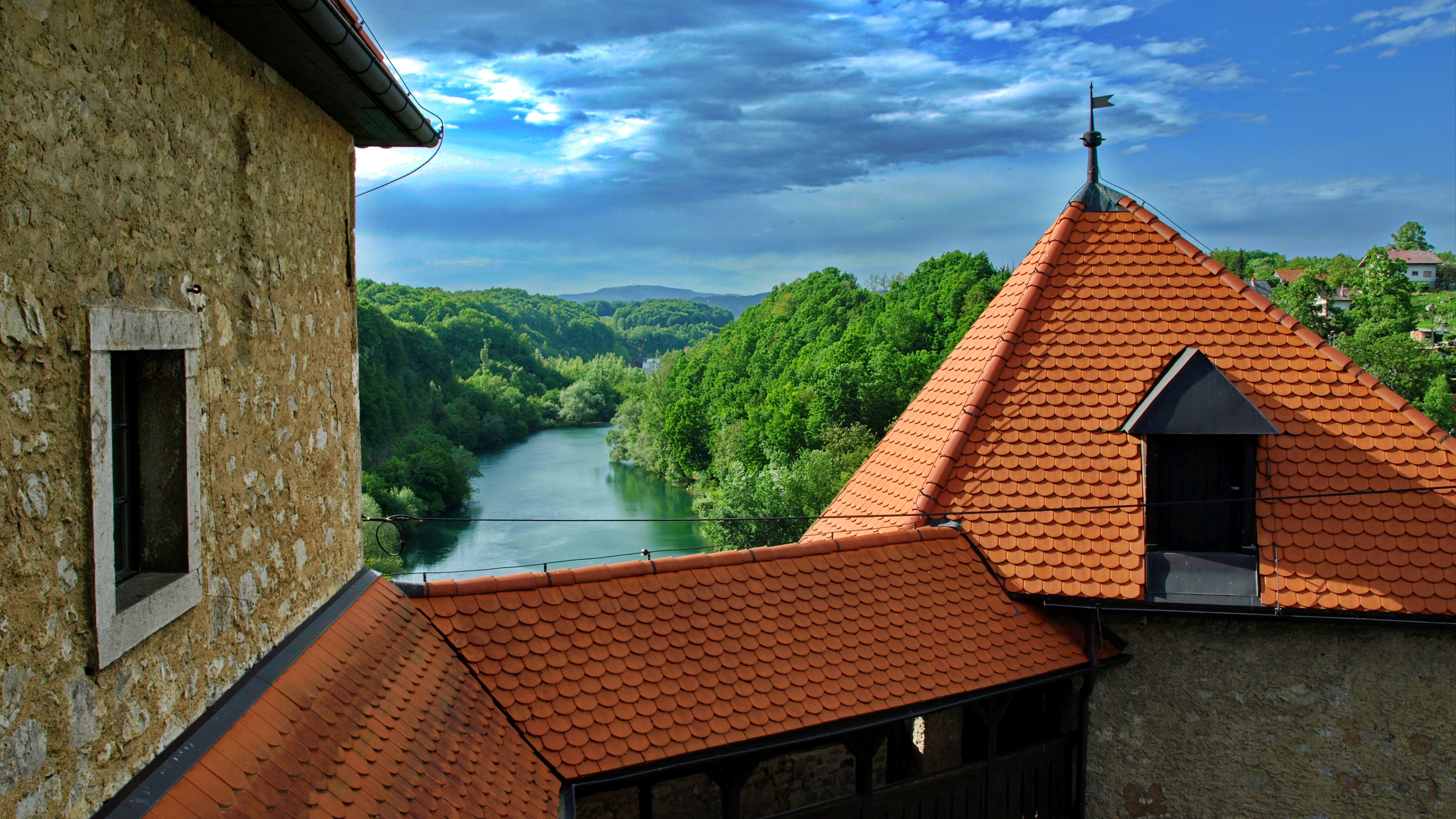
View from caslte to Kupa river

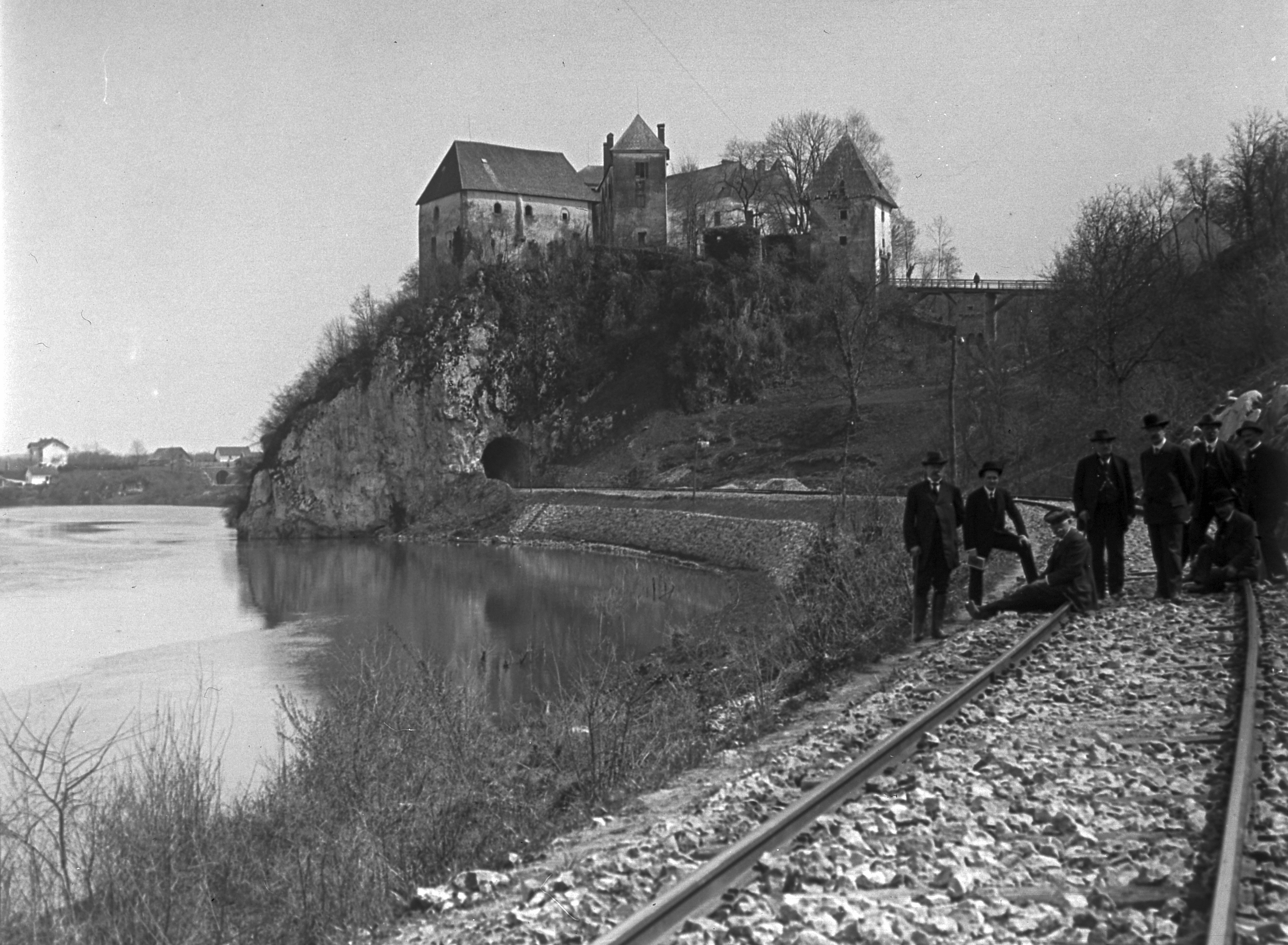
View of castle from 1909

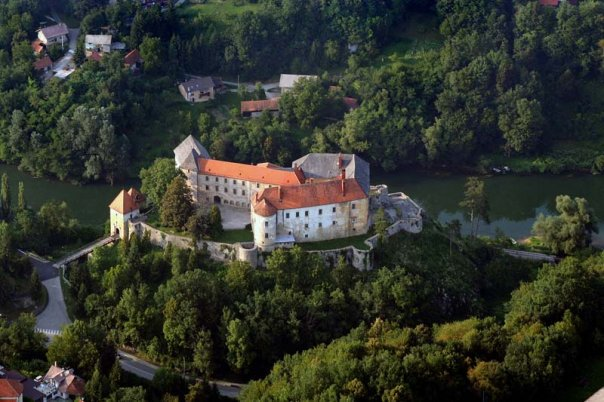
Aerial view

== See also ==
Media related to Ozalj Castle at Wikimedia Commons

- Frankopan
- Zrinski
- Zrinski–Frankopan conspiracy
- List of castles in Croatia
