= Liješće =

Liješće may refer to:

In Bosnia and Herzegovina:

- Liješće (Brod)
- Liješće (Srebrenica)

In Croatia:

- Liješće (Ozalj)

== See also ==
- Malo Lešče
