= Popovići =

Popovići may refer to:

- Popovići, Serbia, a village near Kraljevo
- Popovići, Dubrovnik-Neretva County, a village in Konavle, Croatia
- Popovići, Zadar County, a village near Benkovac, Croatia
- Popovići Žumberački, a former village near Ozalj, Croatia
- Popovići, Glamoč, a village near Glamoč, Bosnia and Herzegovina
- Popovići, Ilijaš, a village near Ilijaš, Bosnia and Herzegovina
- Popovići, Kalinovik, a village near Kalinovik, Bosnia and Herzegovina
- Popovići, Prnjavor, a village near Prnjavor, Bosnia and Herzegovina

== See also ==
- Popović (singular)
