= Liješće (Ozalj) =

- Settlement
- Location within Croatia
- Coordinates: 45°41′35″N 15°18′50″E
- Country: Croatia
- County: Karlovac County
- Municipality: Ozalj

Area
  - Total: 2.2 km^{2} (0.85 sq mi)

Population (2021)
  - Total: 28
  - Density: 13/km^{2} (33/sq mi)
- Time zone: UTC+1 (CET)
  - Summer (DST): UTC+2 (CEST)

Liješće is a settlement in Croatia, part of the Ozalj municipality in Karlovac County. It is located on the Slovene-Croatian border and is surrounded by the Slovene settlements of Malo Lešče, Brezovica pri Metliki and Bojanja vas. As of 2011, the population of Liješće was 37.
