= Griče =

Griče may refer to:

- Griče, Slovenia, a former village near Moravče
- Griče, Croatia, a village near Ribnik
