= Brezovica Žumberačka =

- Settlement
- Interactive map of Brezovica Žumberačka
- Location within Croatia
- Coordinates: 45°41′20″N 15°18′29″E
- Country: Croatia
- County: Karlovac County
- Town: Ozalj

Area
  - Total: 1.4 km^{2} (0.54 sq mi)

Population (2021)
  - Total: 17
  - Density: 12/km^{2} (31/sq mi)
- Time zone: UTC+1 (CET)
  - Summer (DST): UTC+2 (CEST)

Brezovica Žumberačka is a settlement in Croatia, part of the Town of Ozalj in Karlovac County. It is located along the Slovene-Croatian border, next to Brezovica pri Metliki, with which it de facto forms one settlement. De jure, it is a Croatian exclave surrounded by the Slovene villages of Brezovica pri Metliki and Malo Lešče.

The area of the settlement is 1.83 ha. As of 2011, the population is 19.

A depiction of the border
