= Draganić, Karlovac County =

Draganić
- Location within Croatia
- Coordinates: 45°36′N 15°36′E
- Country: Croatia
- County: Karlovac County

Area
  - Total: 72.5 km^{2} (28.0 sq mi)

Population (2021)
  - Total: 2,541
  - Density: 35.0/km^{2} (90.8/sq mi)
- Time zone: UTC+1 (CET)
  - Summer (DST): UTC+2 (CEST)
- Website: draganic.hr

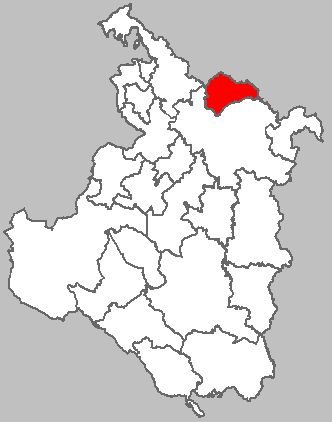
Image of Draganić municipality within the Karlovac County

Draganić is a municipality in Karlovac County, Croatia.

In the 2011 census, it consisted of a single settlement with a total population of 2,741. The municipality consists of the villages of Lug, Goljak, Mrzljaki, Jazvaci, Darići, Budrovci, Bencetici, Barkovići, Draganići, Lazina, Franetici, Vrbanci, and Vrh.

In the same census, 96% of the population were Croats.

Draganić is the birthplace of Ivan Biličić and Marija Barković, paternal grandparents of Bill Belichick, an American football head coach. Belichick is considered by many to be the greatest coach of all time and he holds several coaching records, including the most playoff wins, the most Super Bowl appearances and the most Super Bowl wins.

== Governance ==
=== Judiciary ===
Karlovac was once the seat of the kotar court for an 1870 population of 53,148. In 1875, the kotar court of Karlovac was responsible for the općine: Karlovac city, Banija, Rečica, Draganić, Ozalj, Novigrad, Ribnik, Bosiljevo and Severin.

=== Fiscal ===
When the tax obćine (Serbo-Croatian: porezne obćine) were drawn up in 1855, Draganić was the only one to receive its own obćina without subdivisions.
