= Sjeničak Lasinjski =

- Village
- Location of Sjeničak Lasinjski in Croatia
- Coordinates: 45°27′20″N 15°47′50″E
- Country: Croatia
- Region: Continental Croatia
- County: Karlovac
- Municipality: Lasinja

Area
  - Total: 24.6 km^{2} (9.5 sq mi)
- Elevation: 205 m (673 ft)

Population (2021)
  - Total: 106
  - Density: 4.31/km^{2} (11.2/sq mi)
- Time zone: UTC+1 (CET)
  - Summer (DST): UTC+2 (CEST)
- Postal code: 47213 Sjeničak Lasinjski
- Area code: (+385) 047

Sjeničak Lasinjski is a village in central Croatia, in the municipality of Lasinja, Karlovac County.

== History ==
Today's name Sjeničak originates from the medieval town of Steničnjak, built at the beginning of the 12th century. Name is derived from tit (sjenice in Croatian) and the municipality of Lasinja.

At the Slavonian Sabor of June 1579 in Zagreb, the dange of leaving the river crossings at Sveti Jakov, Luka and Rečica unguarded was noted, so for their fortification the Sabor allocated workers from the feudal estates of Ozalj, Jastrebarsko, Steničnjak, Završje, Slavetić, Turanj (Sveta Jana) and Kaptol Zagrebački.

On 21 September 1897, residents of Sjeničak Lasinjski rose in rebellion (known as Sjeničak rebellion, Croatian: Sjeničarska buna) against (perceived) Hungarisation and loss of privileges previously granted to them as border guards.

A number of young men from the village, Dr. Gojko Nikoliš being one of them, went to Spain to fight as members of the International Brigade in 1936-1937.

Sjeničak Lasinjski suffered significant demographic losses in the World War II with 352 of its residents perishing. Out of those, 137 were civilian victims of fascism, 68 were fallen partisans and 111 succumbed to typhoid.

== Culture ==
The first Serbian Orthodox Parish in the village, which included the village of Prkos Lasinjski, was established in 1715. The first school was established in 1834.

== Demographics ==
According to the 2011 census, the village of Sjeničak Lasinjski has 161 inhabitants. This represents 23.78% of its pre-war population according to the 1991 census.

The 1991 census recorded that 93.35% of the village population were ethnic Serbs (632/677), 1.48% were ethnic Croats (10/677), 1.62% were Yugoslavs (11/677), while 3.55% were of other ethnic origin (24/677).

Historical population 1857-2011
v

population	1042	1124	1106	1283	1367	1491	1377	1696	1073	1266	1191	1078	872	677	189	161
	1857	1869	1880	1890	1900	1910	1921	1931	1948	1953	1961	1971	1981	1991	2001	2011

Sources: Croatian Bureau of Statistics publications

== Sights ==
- Memorial to the victims of fascism and fallen partisans in WW2

== Notable natives and residents ==
- Sava Mrkalj (1783–1833) - linguist and first reformer of the south-Slavic/Serbian Cyrillic alphabet
- Gojko Nikoliš (1911–1995) - medical doctor, historian, volunteer in International Brigades in Spanish Civil War, partisan general, the first Head of the Partisan Medical Corps, member of SANU and People's Hero of Yugoslavia
- Miloš Kljajić (1916–1944) - antifascist and People's Hero of Yugoslavia after whom the village of Kljajićevo in Serbia was named
- Mile Mrkalj (1929–1993) - historian
