= Svetice, Karlovac County =

Settlement in Karlovac County, Croatia

Svetice
- Settlement
- Interactive map of Svetice
- Location of Svetice in Croatia
- Coordinates: 45°35′06″N 15°27′00″E
- Country: Croatia
- County: Karlovac County
- City: Ozalj

Area
  - Total: 1.9 km^{2} (0.73 sq mi)

Population (2021)
  - Total: 17
  - Density: 8.9/km^{2} (23/sq mi)
- Time zone: UTC+1 (CET)
  - Summer (DST): UTC+2 (CEST)
- Postal code: 47280 Ozalj
- Area code: +385 (0)47

Svetice is a settlement in the City of Ozalj in Croatia. In 2021, its population was 17.

== Demographics ==
Svetice: Population trends 1857–2021
v

population	40	66	85	77	85	91	72	73	86	91	75	66	51	47	31	21	17
	1857	1869	1880	1890	1900	1910	1921	1931	1948	1953	1961	1971	1981	1991	2001	2011	2021

Sources: Croatian Bureau of Statistics publications
