= Lasinja =

- Municipality
- Location of Lasinja in Croatia
- Coordinates: 45°31′43″N 15°51′10″E
- Country: Croatia
- Region: Central Croatia
- County: Karlovac County

Area
  - Municipality: 82.1 km^{2} (31.7 sq mi)
  - Urban: 5.5 km^{2} (2.1 sq mi)
- Elevation: 138 m (453 ft)

Population (2021)
  - Municipality: 1,322
  - Density: 16.1/km^{2} (41.7/sq mi)
  - Urban: 542
  - Urban density: 99/km^{2} (260/sq mi)
- Time zone: UTC+1 (CET)
  - Summer (DST): UTC+2 (CEST)
- Postal code: 47206
- Area code: (+385) 047
- Website: lasinja.hr

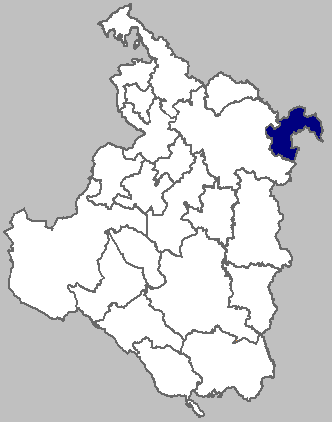
Lasinja municipality within Karlovac County

Lasinja is a village and a municipality in Karlovac County, Croatia. The prehistoric Lasinja culture is named after Lasinja.

== Demographics ==
According to the 2011 census, the municipality of Lasinja has 1624 inhabitants, 86.58% (1 406) of whom are ethnic Croats and 11.82% (192) who are ethnic Serbs.

=== Settlements ===
Municipality includes the following settlements:

- Banski Kovačevac - 120
- Crna Draga - 136
- Desno Sredičko - 213
- Desni Štefanki - 265
- Lasinja - 573
- Novo Selo Lasinjsko - 108
- Prkos Lasinjski - 52
- Sjeničak Lasinjski - 157
