= Novigrad na Dobri =

- Village
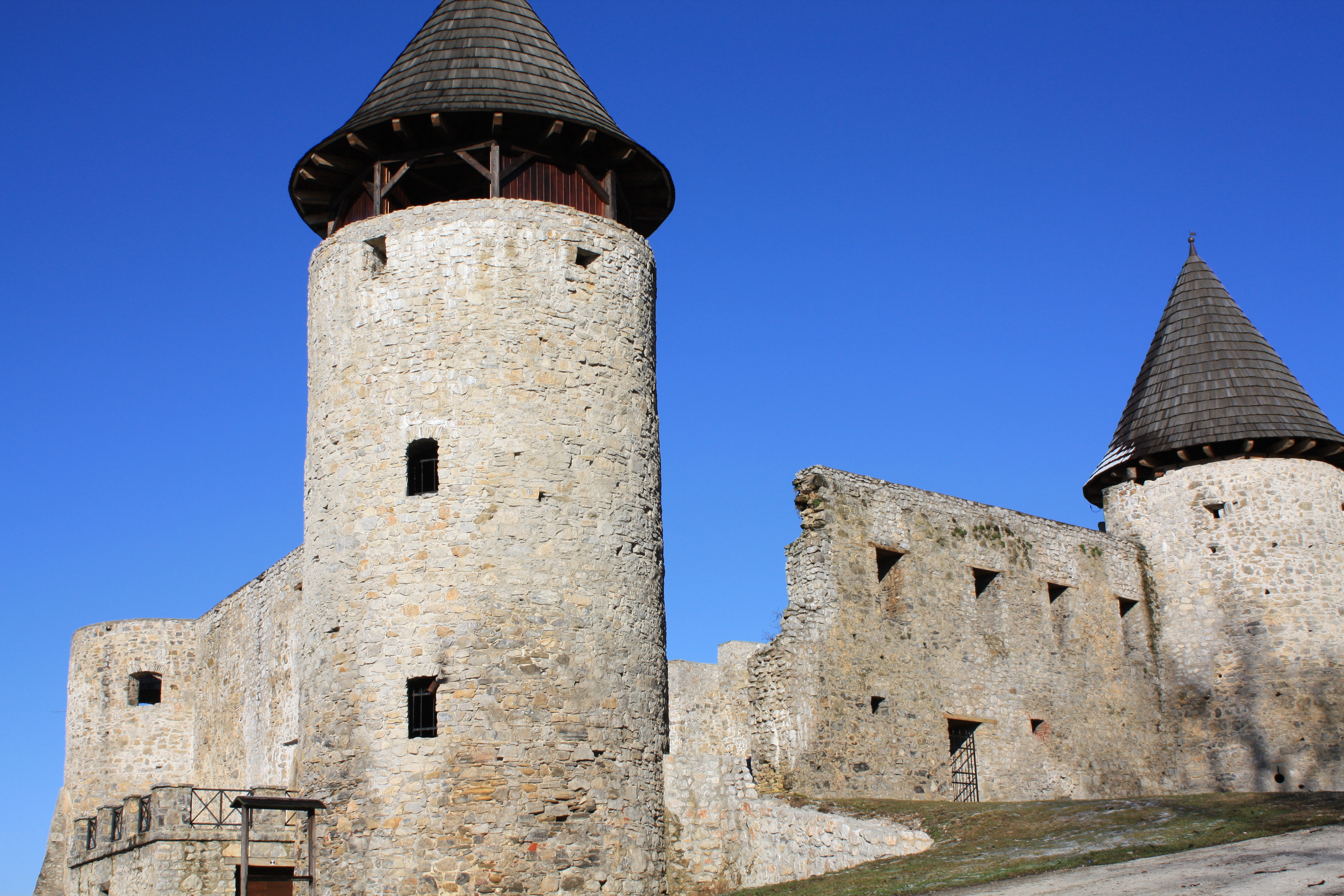
- The Castle of Novigrad na Dobri

- Location within Croatia
- Coordinates: 45.472126°N 15.443483°E
- Country: Croatia
- County: Karlovac County
- Municipality: Netretić

Area
  - Total: 1.0 km^{2} (0.39 sq mi)

Population (2021)
  - Total: 62
  - Density: 62/km^{2} (160/sq mi)
- Time zone: UTC+1 (CET)
  - Summer (DST): UTC+2 (CEST)

Novigrad na Dobri is a village in Karlovac County, Croatia. The name translates in English to "New town on the Dobra river".

Across the river Dobra, there is a 14th-century castle that once belonged to the Croatian noble family Frankopan.

== Name ==
It was recorded as Nouigrad on the 1673 map of Stjepan Glavač.

== Geography ==
The castle is situated above a cliff on the right bank of the Dobra, only a 5.7 kilometres (3.5 mi) drive from the Ž3141 road, from which it is prominently visible, as is the case from the more recently built A6 only 3.2 kilometres (2.0 mi) away. It is also only 5.3 kilometres (3.3 mi) from the junction of the D3 and D23. The castle is a 7.5 kilometres (4.7 mi) walk from Dubovac castle and 11 kilometres (6.8 mi) from Zvečaj castle.

A park was once maintained around the castle, but it is now overgrown.

The castle's floorplan is a scalene triangle, with a large circular tower on the north corner and two smaller circular towers on the other corners. The east and west walls have two small semi-towers. Multi-storeyed living quarters are situated between the towers. The inner court is surrounded by open arcades. The only entrance is on the south side.

== History ==
It is not known when Novigrad was built, (Note: Despite "1193" often being given.) nor when the Frankopan family came into possession of it. Its earliest mention dates to 1495 and it was not mentioned again in surviving documents until 1550.

In 1543, the Turks burned Novigrad, Ribnik and Metlika.

A 1558 legal document on the confiscation of the property of Stjepan IV Frankopan Ozaljski listed Novigrad, a walled castle with a substantial income from the toll bridge over the Dobra, over which the main road from Metlika to Budački and on to Kladuša, passed. Beneath the castle was a marketplace.

The castle was mentioned in 1561.

In 1578, the Turks attacked Novigrad, carrying off 126 of those living below it into captivity.

During the fortification of Karlovac in 1588, Novigrad was part of its supply chain, being counted together with Dubovac, Bosiljevo and Ribnik. Ozalj owed the same as all of these four. Each owed 6 carts of timber, and although there were complaints about the conduct of the soldiers stationed in Karlovac, the order was complied with.

For the fortification of Ivanić in 1598, Bosiljevo and Novigrad had to supply 30 labourers. Rečica was to supply Novigrad with as many carts and labourers as possible.

Following the construction of Karlovac, relative peace was achieved in the region, and Novigrad was resettled with refugees from Turkish territory among others.

On 8 June 1654, Juraj V Frankapan Tržački issued in Novigrad a document granting Stjepan Domitrović a selo in Osojnik, while ordering a resolution to the border dispute between Jadrč and Ponikve.

As a result of the loss of control over the castle by the Frankopans in their revolt, the castle was looted in 1670 by the troops of baron Friedrich Sauer, vice general of Karlovac.

The castle was transferred into the ownership of General of Karlovac Johann Joseph Herberstein, in whose ownership it remained until his death in 1689. Herberstein willed it to the Maltese Order.

In 1746, the Maltese Order sold the castle to baron Stjepan Patačić, who renovated it as a baroque castle.

Joseph II, Holy Roman Emperor once slept in the castle on his way to the coast.

Upon the territory's conquest by the French in 1809, the castle was purchased by French major Mirko Haraminčić.

After the expulsion of the French, the castle was transferred to the ownership of the Croatian and Slavonian State Land Treasury (Croatian: Hrvatski zemaljski erar), who sold it to Franjo Türk, who renovated it in the late 19th century.

At the beginning of the 20th century, the castle was renovated, and in the process many of its martial constructions were destroyed, with the exception of a few arrowslits.

In 1919, the castle was purchased by Baron Zdenko Turković.

In 1939, the castle ended up in the ownership of the Banovina of Croatia.

On 4 January 1944, (Note: 12 December 1944 according to a handwritten note on the first page of Program konzervacije i obnove starog grada Novigrada na Dobri.) the castle was burned by the Yugoslav Partisans. As a result, it remained in ruins for decades and has yet to be fully repaired.

Renovation of the castle in hopes of attracting tourists began in 1963. But these renovations were never completed, and in little time, no work was being done on restoring the castle.

Further renovation efforts were begun in 1994 under the župan of Karlovac County, Josip Jakovčić, together with Miroslav Preglej, Marina Šojat and Vladimir Peršin. As a result of these efforts, the Society of Friends of Novigrad na Dobri "Frankopan" (Croatian: Društvo prijatelja Novigrada na Dobri "Frankopan") was founded, beginning more serious restoration work in 1999 with the expertise of the Konzervatorski odjel u Karlovcu and financing by the Ministry of Culture.

== Governance ==
=== Judiciary ===
Karlovac was once the seat of the kotar court for an 1870 population of 53,148. In 1875, the kotar court of Karlovac was responsible for the općine: Karlovac city, Banija, Rečica, Draganić, Ozalj, Novigrad, Ribnik, Bosiljevo and Severin.

== Bibliography ==
- Kruhek, Milan (1976). Stari gradovi između Kupe i Korane [Old Castles Between the Kupa and the Korana] (PDF) (in Croatian).
- Melem Hajdarović, Mihela (2023-06-14). "Glavačeva karta Hrvatske iz 1673. – njezini toponimi, geografski sadržaj i historijskogeografski kontekst" [Glavač’s map of Croatia from 1673: Its toponyms, geographical content, and historical-geographical context]. Studia lexicographica. 17 (32): 47–78. doi:10.33604/sl.17.32.2. eISSN 2459-5578.
