= Požun, Croatia =

Požun
- Location of Požun in Croatia
- Coordinates: 45.617°N 15.469°E
- Country: Croatia
- County: Karlovac County
- Municipality: Ozalj

Area
  - Total: 0.3 km^{2} (0.12 sq mi)

Population (2021)
  - Total: 34
  - Density: 110/km^{2} (290/sq mi)
- Time zone: UTC+1 (Central European Time)

Požun is a settlement in Croatia, part of the town of Ozalj in Karlovac County. Požun sits on the left bank of the Kupa, opposite Ozalj Castle.

== Name ==
Požun is also the Croatian and Slovene name for Bratislava (formerly Slovak Prešporok; German: Pressburg or Preßburg; Latin: Posonium; Hungarian: Pozsony). The village of Požun may have been named after this city.

== History ==
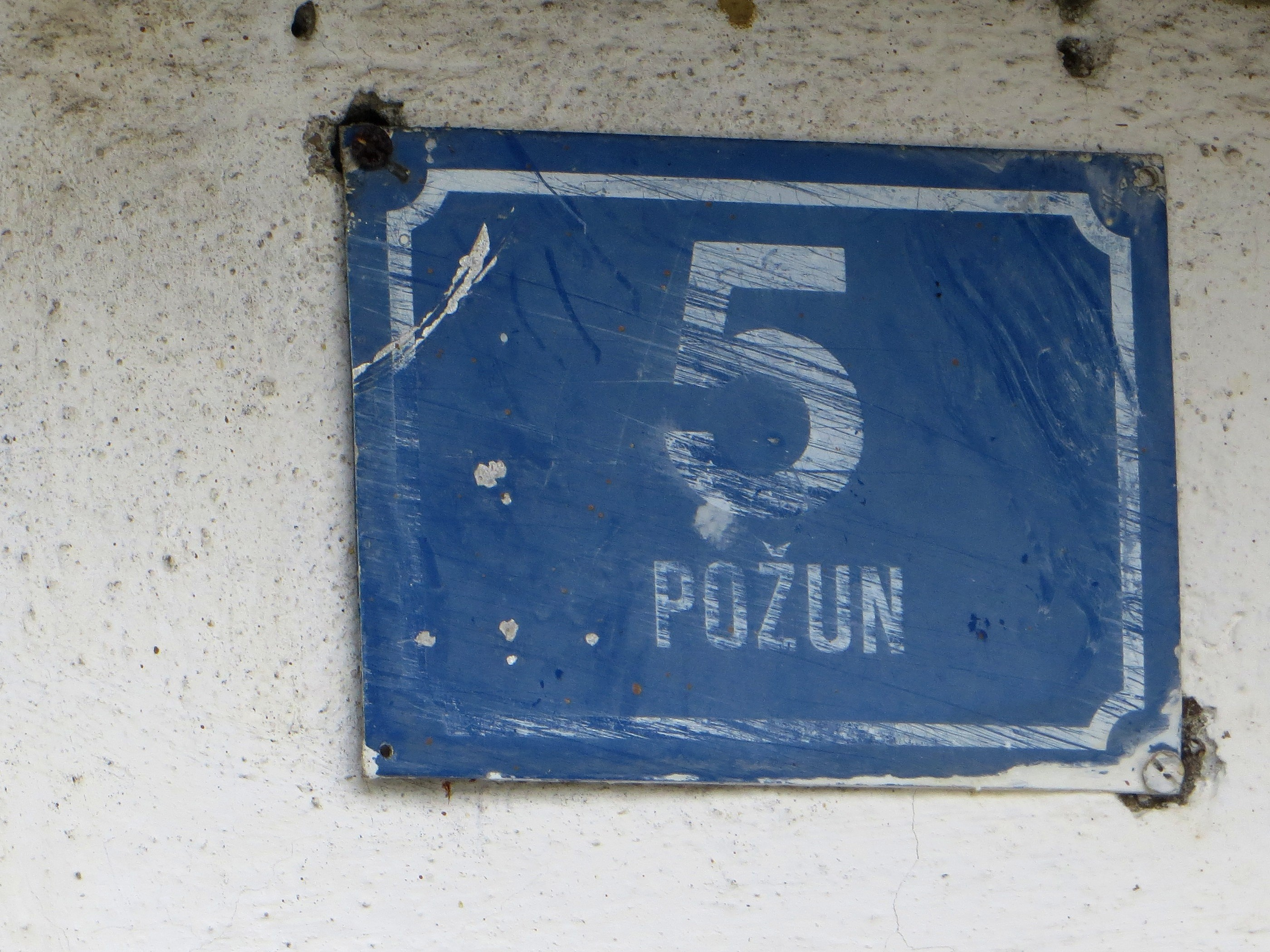
House number in Požun (Ozalj)

Little is known of the history of Požun. The museum in Ozalj Castle holds a stone axe found in Požun from the Neolithic Lengyel culture that dates from the 5th century B.C. This testifies to ancient settlement in the area, but it is unknown when the modern village of Požun was founded.

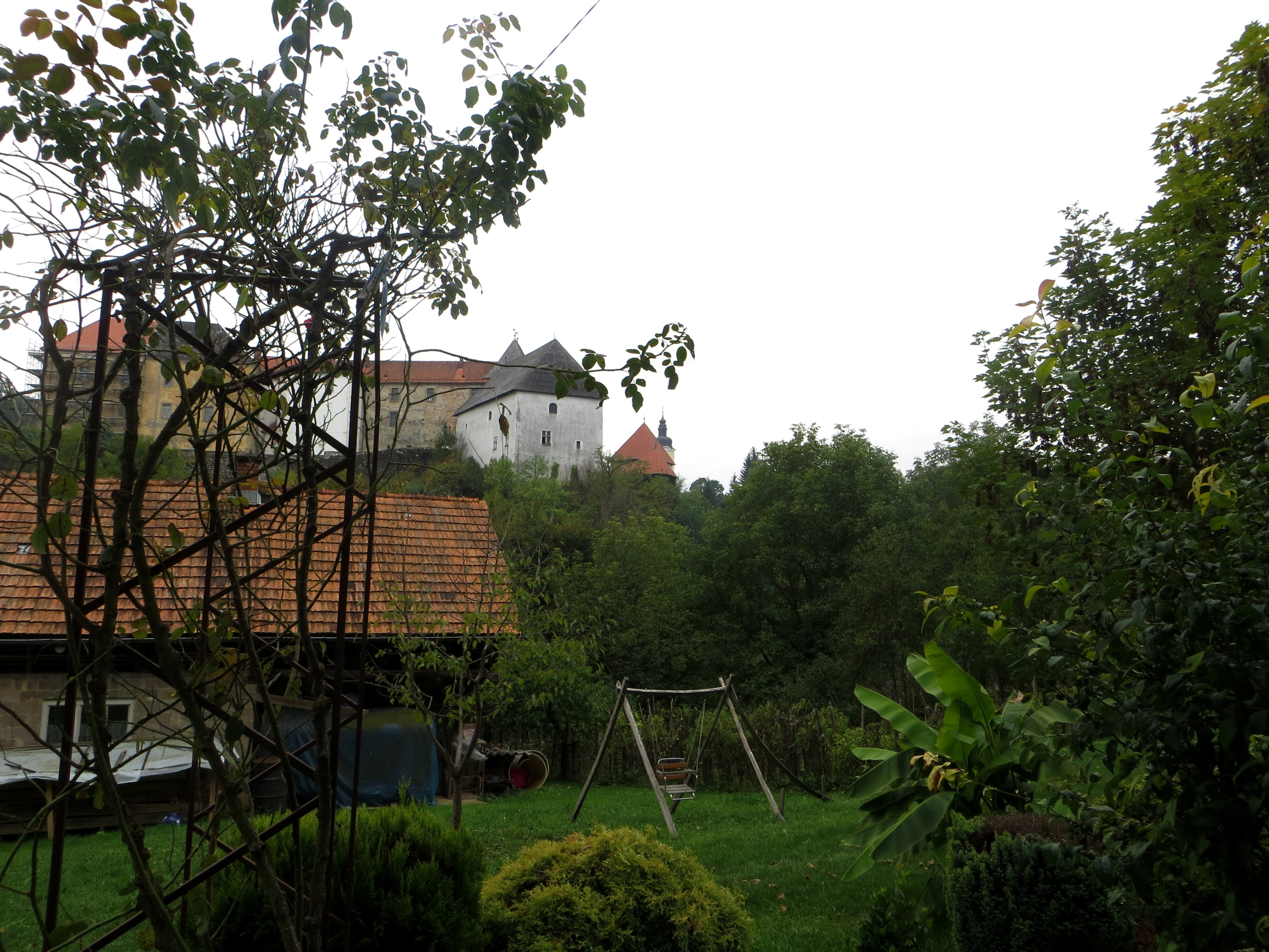
Ozalj Castle from Požun (Ozalj)

From 1102 to 1526, Croatia was ruled by the King of Hungary. After Hungary's defeat at the Battle of Mohács in 1526, a large swathe of Hungarian territory was occupied by the Ottoman Empire. The parts of Hungary not occupied by the Ottomans, including Croatia, entered the Austrian Habsburg monarchy. With Budapest in Ottoman hands, Poszony was designated the new capital of Hungary. The city became a coronation town and the seat of kings, archbishops (1543), the nobility and all major organisations and offices. Though they entered the monarchy separately, Croatia and Hungary were eventually united again within the monarchy and there were strong links between Poszony and Croatia in this period.

According to legend, Count Nikola Zrinski settled some Croats here from Poszony. There are two Count Nikola Zrinskis, however, and it is not clear to which this refers. The first lived from 1508 to 1566 and the second from 1620 to 1664. Without more exact information, the best that can be determined is that Požun was established at some point between the mid-16th and mid-17th century.

== Population ==
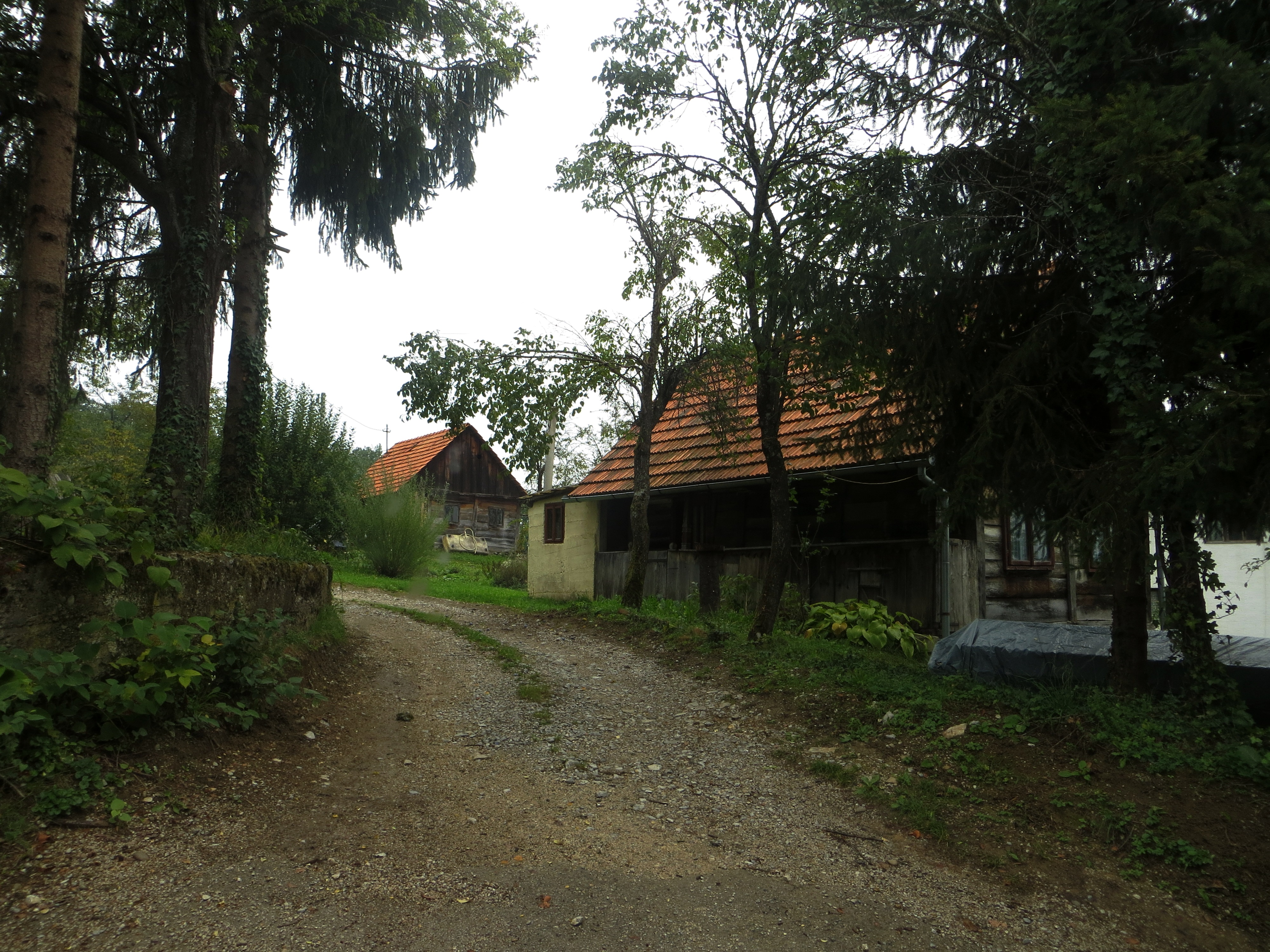
Houses in Požun (Ozalj)

According to the 2001 census, the settlement had 50 residents and 19 households.

According to the 2011 census, the settlement had 35 residents and 15 households. There were also 33 housing units, of which 21 were dwellings for permanent habitation.

Among residents of Požun, the following surnames are present: Čoraga, Jagunić, Volovšćak, Brajković, Tuškan, Volovščak, Kupres, Pavlaković, Badurina, Pilat, Radmanović and Fember. Čoraga is a rare surname in Croatia today, but it is the most common name in Požun (50% of the population).

Population over time 1857–2011
v

population	54	66	67	47	71	84	72	79	87	82	92	97	79	65	50	35
	1857	1869	1880	1890	1900	1910	1921	1931	1948	1953	1961	1971	1981	1991	2001	2011

Sources: Croatian Bureau of Statistics publications

== Gallery ==
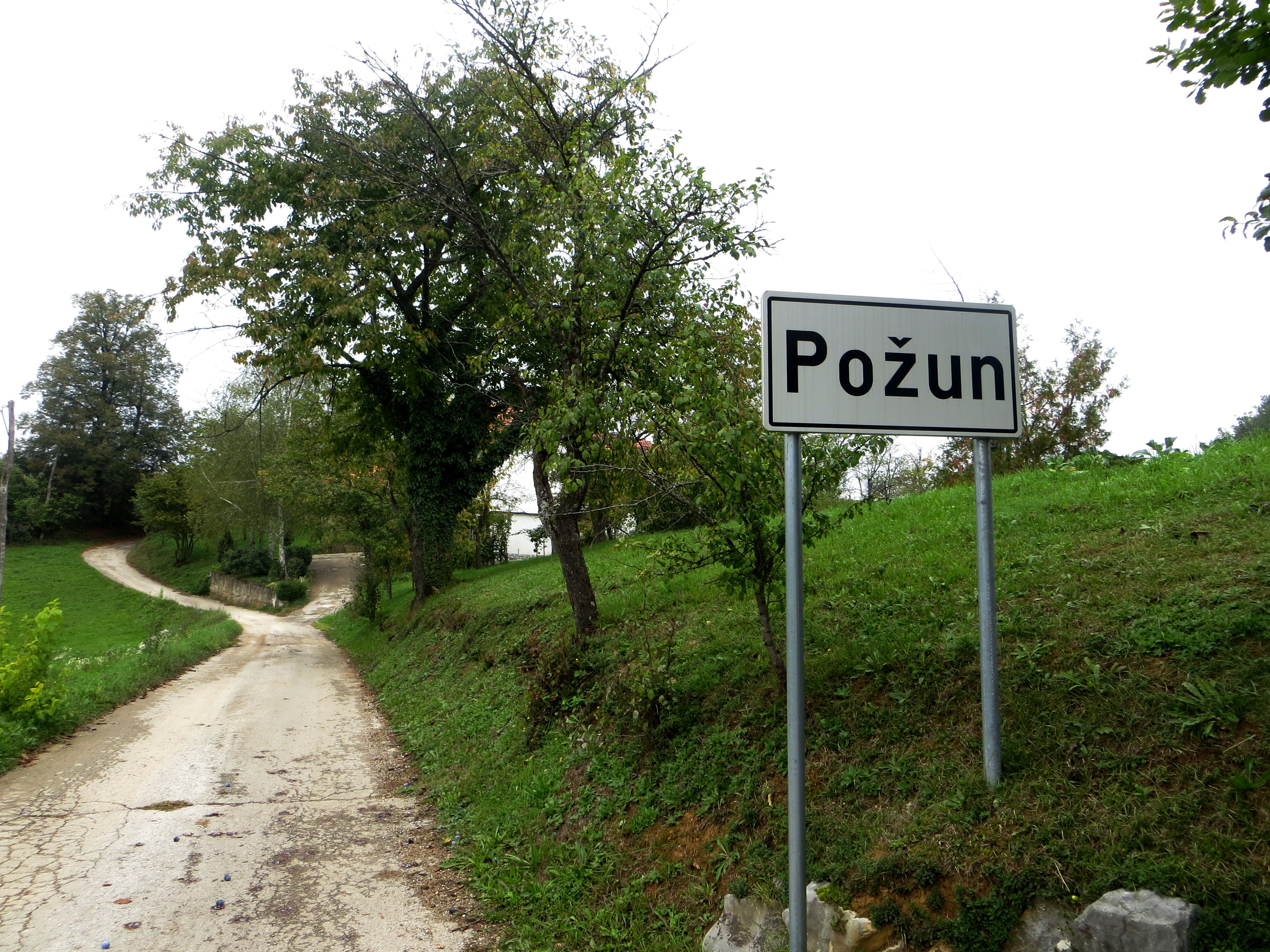
Sign at the border of Požun (Ozalj)

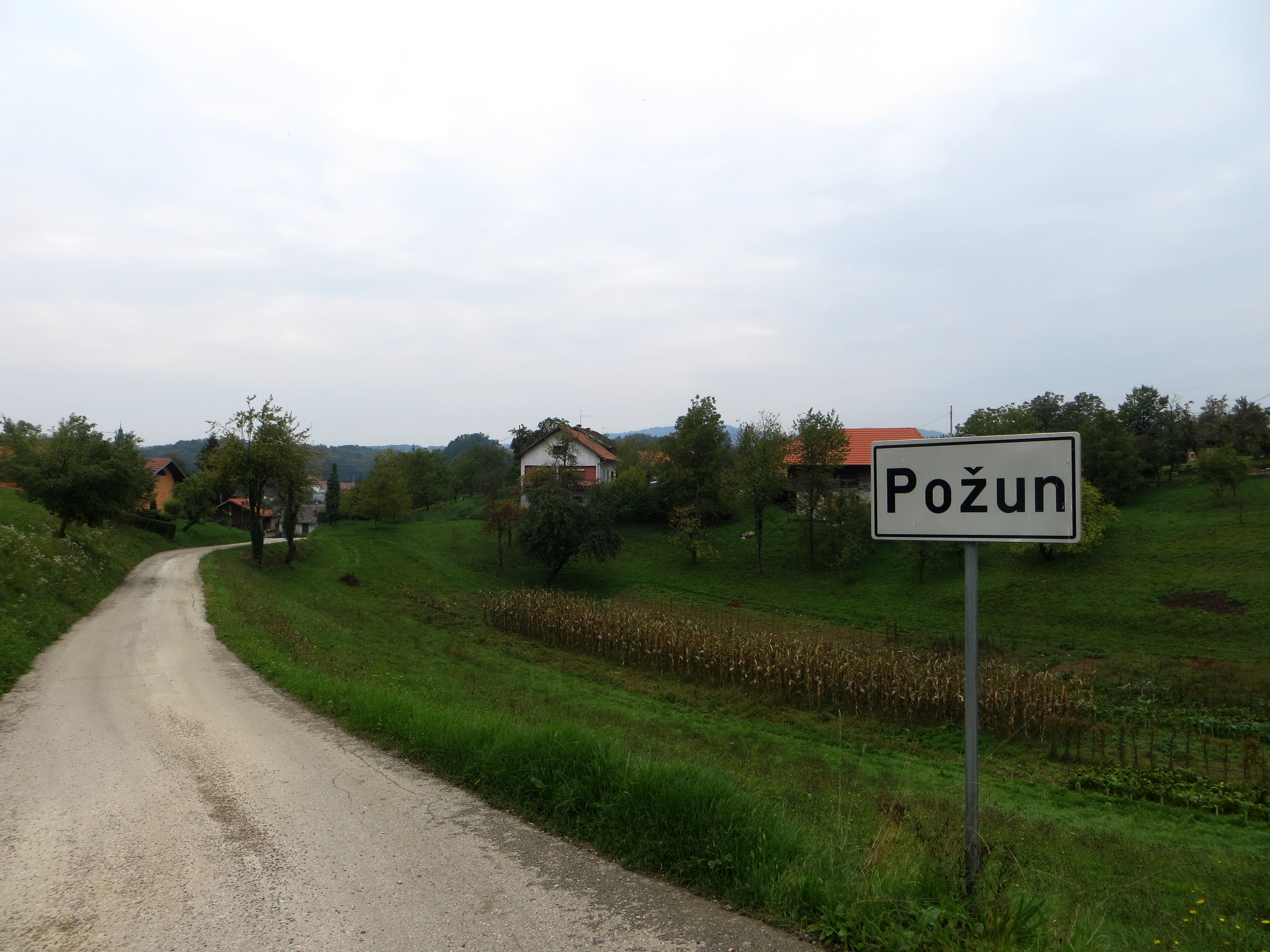
Sign at the border of Požun (Ozalj)

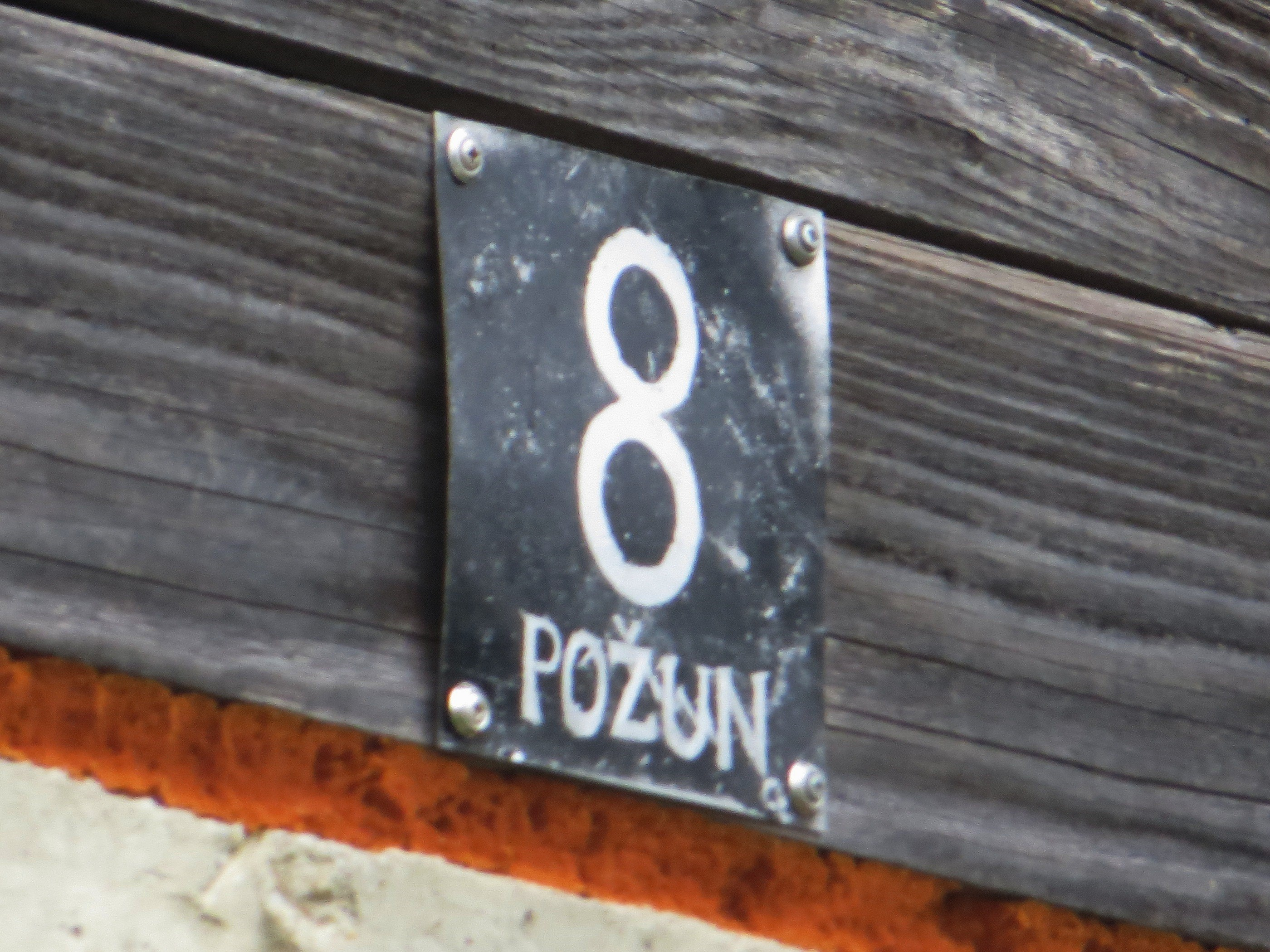
House number in Požun (Ozalj)

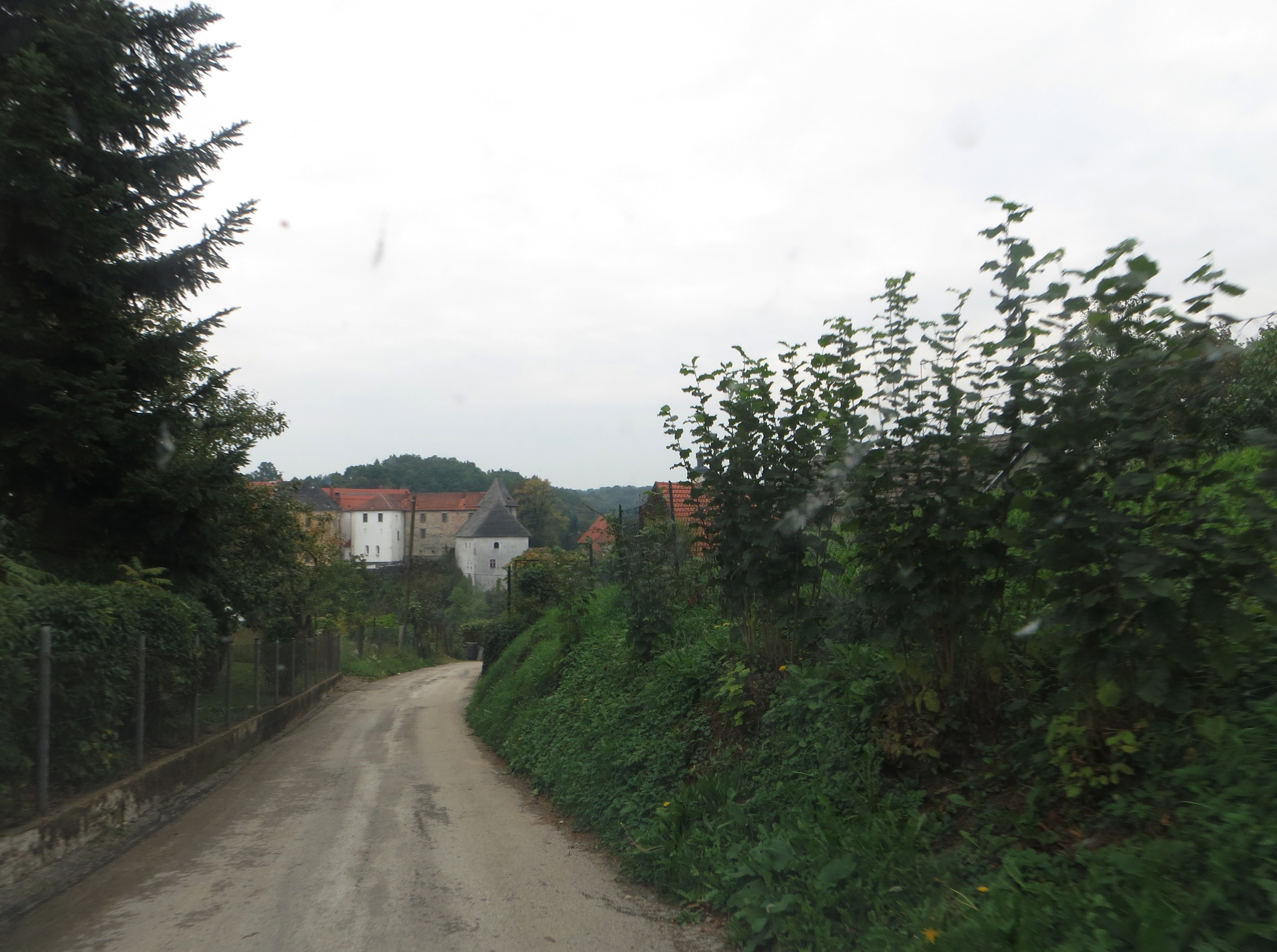
Ozalj Castle from Požun (Ozalj)

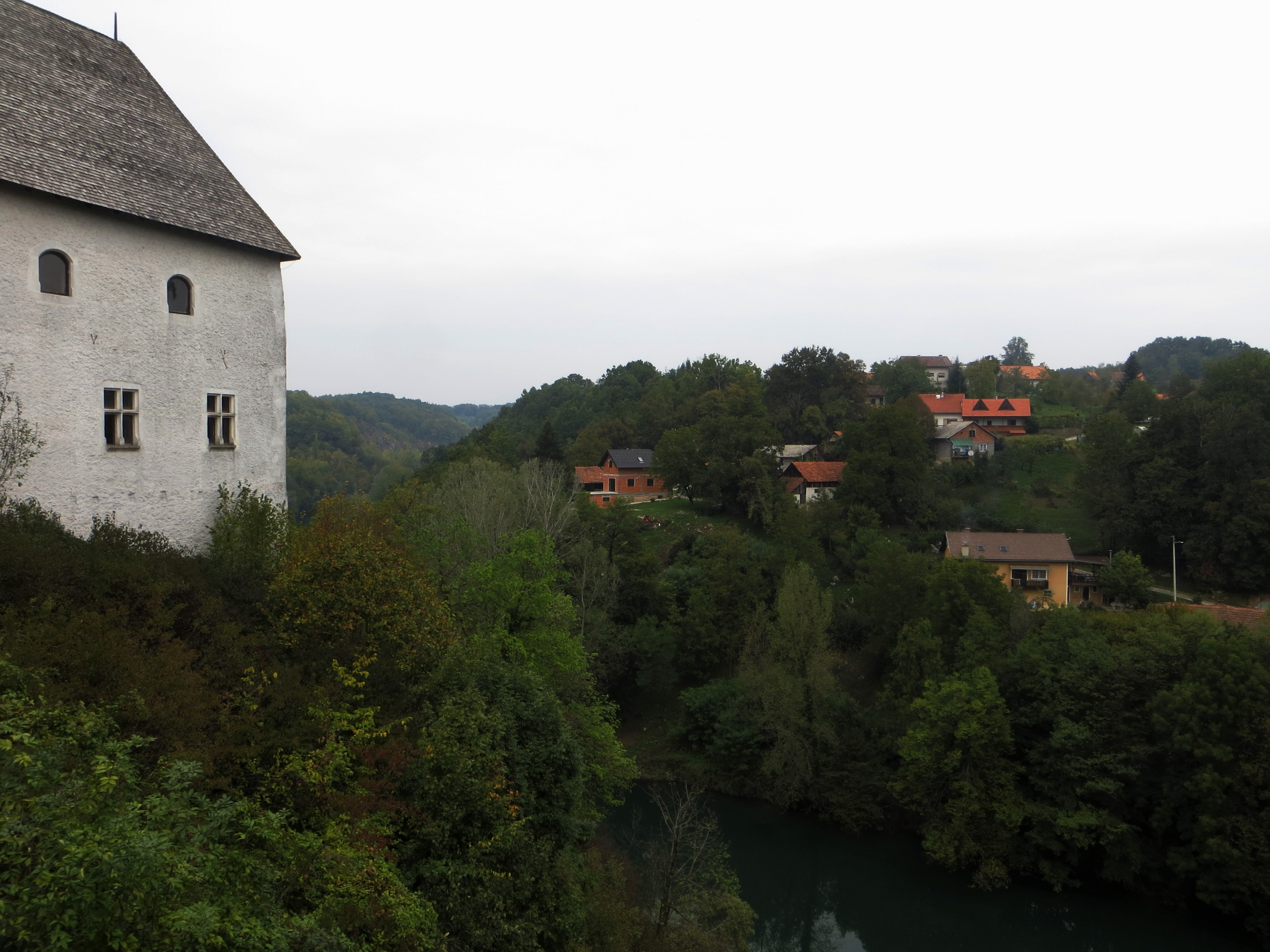
Požun (Ozalj) from Ozalj Castle

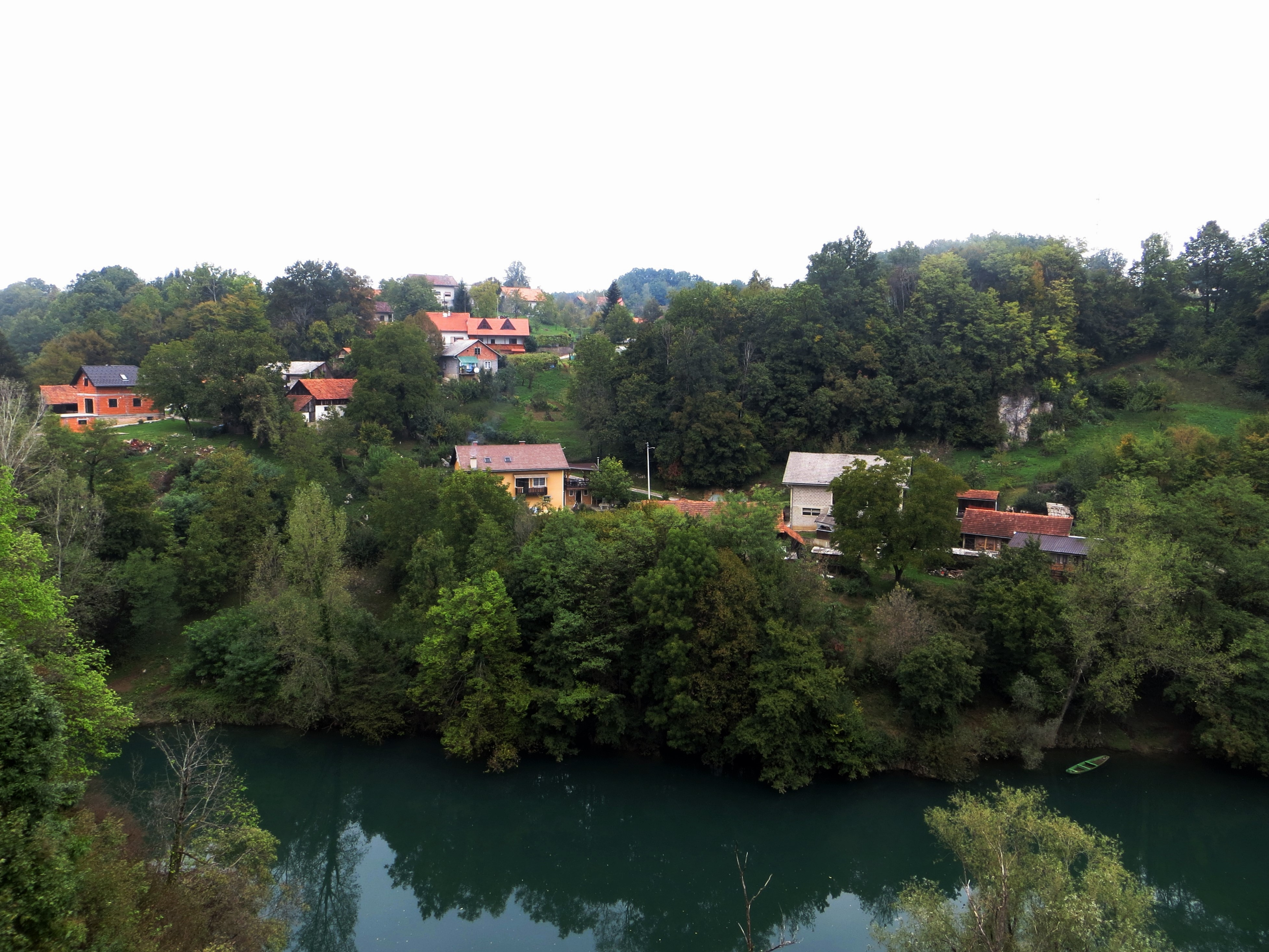
Požun (Ozalj) from Ozalj Castle
