= Podbrežje =

Settlement in Karlovac County, Croatia

- Settlement
- Interactive map of Podbrežje
- Location of Podbrežje in Croatia
- Coordinates: 45°37′41″N 15°30′00″E
- Country: Croatia
- County: Karlovac County
- City: Ozalj

Area
  - Total: 3.8 km^{2} (1.5 sq mi)

Population (2021)
  - Total: 258
  - Density: 68/km^{2} (180/sq mi)
- Time zone: UTC+1 (CET)
  - Summer (DST): UTC+2 (CEST)
- Postal code: 47280 Ozalj
- Area code: +385 (0)47

Podbrežje is a settlement in the City of Ozalj in Croatia. In 2021, its population was 258.

== Demographics ==
Podbrežje: Population trends 1857–2021
v

population	297	334	319	395	424	440	484	496	521	540	514	475	457	412	332	321	258
	1857	1869	1880	1890	1900	1910	1921	1931	1948	1953	1961	1971	1981	1991	2001	2011	2021

Sources: Croatian Bureau of Statistics publications
