= Nikola VI Zrinski =

Croatian count

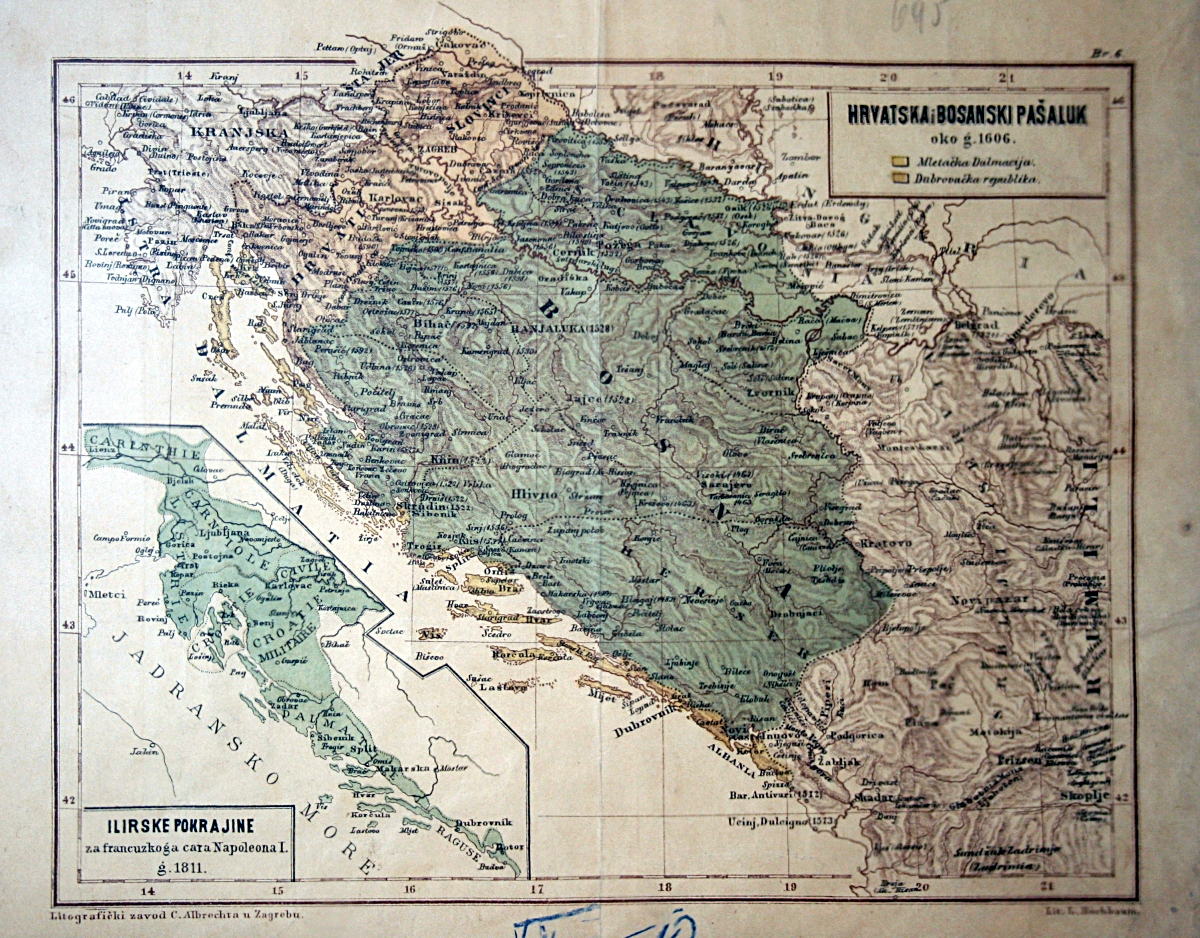
Kingdom of Croatia (pale brown), Republic of Dubrovnik (yellow), possession of Republic of Venice on Croatian coast (orange), and Ottoman Empire's Pashalik of Bosnia (green) in 1606, when Nikola VI Zrinski was head of his family.

Nikola VI Zrinski (Nicholas VI Zrinski, Hungarian: Zrínyi VI. Miklós), (c. 1570 in Čakovec(?) – 24 March 1625 in Čakovec), was a Croatian count, a member of the Zrinski noble family.

== Life ==
He was the son of Croatian count Juraj IV Zrinski and the grandson of the famous Ban of Croatia, Nikola IV Zrinski (1508–1566), the hero of Szigetvar. His younger brother Juraj V became the Croatian Ban in 1622.

Living mostly in his large Međimurje estate, the northernmost part of Croatia, with the strongly fortified Čakovec Castle, he held since 1608 the title of Captain general of Transdanubia, a region in Hungary, and fought the invasive Turkish forces.

After the death of his father in 1603 he inherited large estates throughout Croatia, which was at that time heavily endangered by the Ottomans and squeezed along its northwestern borders, with the remaining parts then called the "reliquiae reliquiarum olim inclyti regni Croatiae" ("remnants of the once great and glorious Kingdom of Croatia"). Nikola VI Zrinski possessed the following estates: Međimurje in the north, then Vrbovec, Rakovec, Lonjica and Božjakovina in Prigorje, Medvedgrad, Šestine, Lukavec and Brezovica at Zagreb, Ozalj, Ribnik, Dubovac and some other estates near Karlovac, Brod na Kupi, Čabar, Gerovo and several smaller manors in Gorski kotar, as well as Bakar, Grobnik, Hreljin, Grižane, Kraljevica and other properties on the Adriatic coast and its hinterland. On those estates there were about thirty castles and fortifications that protected and defended them.

Because of his marriage with countess Anna, daughter of Ferenc Nádasdy, as a son-in-law participated in 1610–1611 in the arrest and trial of Elizabeth Báthory, the Countess Dracula.

Since there were no children in his marriage with Anna, his brother Juraj V succeeded him when he died in 1625. Less than two years later, after Juraj's sudden death, Juraj sons and Nikola VI's nephews Nikola VII and Petar IV, both future distinguished Croatian Bans, became his successors.

== See also ==
- Zrinski family
- Zrinski family tree
- Čakovec Castle
