= Prkos =

Prkos may refer to:

- Prkos, Koprivnica-Križevci County, a village near Rasinja, Croatia
- Prkos, Zadar County, a village near Škabrnja, Croatia
- Prkos Lasinjski, a village in Karlovac County, Croatia
