= Luka Pokupska =

Coordinates: 45°30′54″N 15°40′12″E

- Village
- Interactive map of Luka Pokupska
- Country: Croatia
- County: Karlovac County

Area
  - Total: 20.3 km^{2} (7.8 sq mi)

Population (2021)
  - Total: 328
  - Density: 16.2/km^{2} (41.8/sq mi)
- Time zone: UTC+1 (CET)
  - Summer (DST): UTC+2 (CEST)

Luka Pokupska is a village in Croatia. It is connected by the D36 highway. There were 410 inhabitants in 2001.

== History ==
At the Slavonian Sabor of June 1579 in Zagreb, the dange of leaving the river crossings at Sveti Jakov, Luka and Rečica unguarded was noted, so for their fortification the Sabor allocated workers from the feudal estates of Ozalj, Jastrebarsko, Steničnjak, Završje, Slavetić, Turanj (Sveta Jana) and Kaptol Zagrebački.
