= Rečica, Croatia =

Rečica
- Location within Croatia
- Coordinates: 45°30′50″N 15°39′47″E
- Country: Croatia
- County: Karlovac
- City: Karlovac

Area
  - Total: 24.0 km^{2} (9.3 sq mi)

Population (2021)
  - Total: 489
  - Density: 20.4/km^{2} (52.8/sq mi)
- Time zone: UTC+1 (CET)
  - Summer (DST): UTC+2 (CEST)

Rečica is a village in Croatia located east of Karlovac, with a population of 538 (2011).

Rečica is a lowland village made up of seven smaller villages. It is settled in the region of Donje Pokuplje on the left bank of river Kupa, about ten kilometers from Karlovac. During the 17th and the 18th century, Rečica was an important traffic locality because it was a place of cargo (mainly grain) discharge during the low water level of Kupa. Farming is still one of the main industries along with wine growing and livestock breeding.

The first mention of Rečica in official documents was in the 15th century, as a separate manorial estate gathered around a wooden palace which was an aristocratic manor in Rečica. The most important cultural and historical monument of Rečica and its surroundings is the Drašković castle, a remnant of a much bigger seigniory. The castle's most famous owner is the count Janko Drašković, who lived here in the first half of the 19th century. There is also the Church of St John the Baptist which dates from the 18th century. Rečica also has an elementary school, an infirmary, a dentist, a veterinary, a grocery store and a cafe.

== History ==
At the Slavonian Sabor of June 1579 in Zagreb, the dange of leaving the river crossings at Sveti Jakov, Luka and Rečica unguarded was noted, so for their fortification the Sabor allocated workers from the feudal estates of Ozalj, Jastrebarsko, Steničnjak, Završje, Slavetić, Turanj (Sveta Jana) and Kaptol Zagrebački.

For the fortification of Ivanić in 1598, Bosiljevo and Novigrad had to supply 30 labourers. Rečica was to supply Novigrad with as many carts and labourers as possible.

== Governance ==
=== Judiciary ===
Karlovac was once the seat of the kotar court for an 1870 population of 53,148. In 1875, the kotar court of Karlovac was responsible for the općine: Karlovac city, Banija, Rečica, Draganić, Ozalj, Novigrad, Ribnik, Bosiljevo and Severin.
