= Dubovac Castle =

Dubovac Castle Utvrđeni grad Dubovac
- Karlovac, in Karlovac County; Croatia
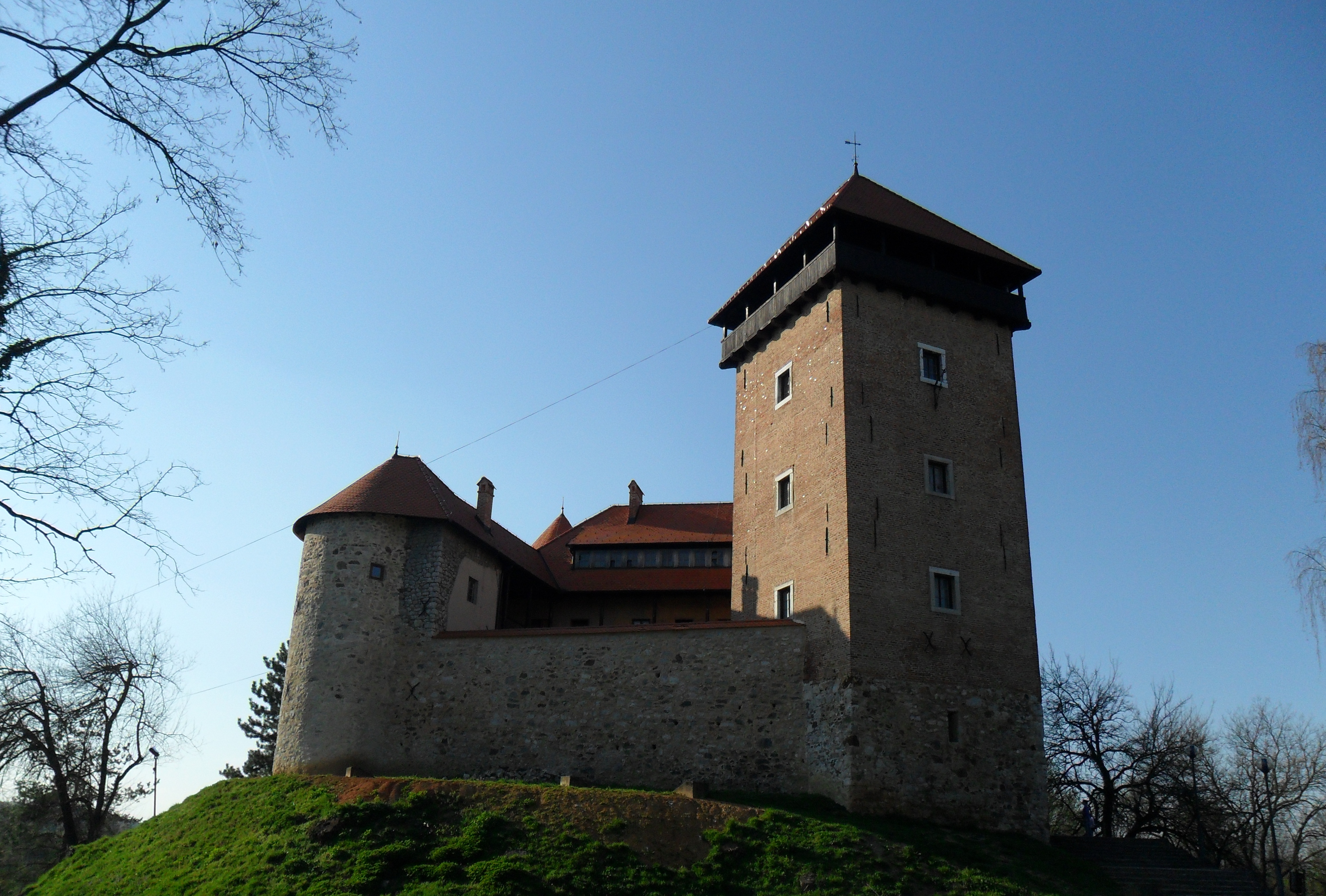
- Dubovac Castle

Site information
- Type: Castle
- Controlled by: Frankopan and Zrinski

Location
- Location within Croatia
- Coordinates: 45.495°N 15.528°E

Site history
- Built: 13th-15th century
- Materials: Limestone

Dubovac Castle is a castle in Karlovac, Croatia.

The Dubovac Castle overlooks the city of Karlovac in central Croatia.

== Name ==
It was recorded as Dubouetz on the 1673 map of Stjepan Glavač.

== History ==
Its square tower was probably built during the 13th century.

In the 15th century, the castle was rebuilt in Renaissance style.

Dubovac was mentioned on 22 February 1481 in a document freeing the citizens of Grič from tariffs in Dubovac and elsewhere.

During the fortification of Karlovac in 1588, Dubovac was part of its supply chain, being counted together with Novigrad, Bosiljevo and Ribnik. Ozalj owed the same as all of these four. Each owed 6 carts of timber, and although there were complaints about the conduct of the soldiers stationed in Karlovac, the order was complied with.

In 1604, Nikola VI Zrinski tried to buy the castle, for which along with other properties Emperor Rudolf II sought 93,495 florins.

The castle had various owners—from Slavonian nobleman family Sudar to famous Croatian counts and dukes Frankopan and Zrinski. From 1671 until 1809, the Dubovac was owned by the Karlovac generals. In 1837, a new owner, Count Laval Nugent, rebuilt the castle in the spirit of romanticism. Dubovac was once again renovated in 1952 in relation to graphics from the end of the 18th century." There is a photograph of the castle at that site.

The castle was used for several years recently as a hotel, and the damage done to the interior to accommodate rooms is now being repaired. There are museum exhibits and a large model of the countryside. Guide materials indicate that the fortress was built on a hill constructed by the people in order to maximize defenses and views of the surrounding areas.

The castle recently was featured on a commemorative Croatian postage stamp, complete with photograph.

== Bibliography ==
- Melem Hajdarović, Mihela (2023-06-14). "Glavačeva karta Hrvatske iz 1673. – njezini toponimi, geografski sadržaj i historijskogeografski kontekst" [Glavač’s map of Croatia from 1673: Its toponyms, geographical content, and historical-geographical context]. Studia lexicographica. 17 (32): 47–78. doi:10.33604/sl.17.32.2. eISSN 2459-5578.
