= Dvorište Vivodinsko =

Dvorište Vivodinsko Dvorišće Vivodinsko
- Location of Dvorišće Vivodinsko in Croatia
- Coordinates: 45.612908°N 15.477718°E
- Country: Croatia
- County: Karlovac County
- Municipality: Ozalj

Government
  - Mayor: Biserka Vranić (SDP)

Area
  - Total: 1.5 km^{2} (0.58 sq mi)

Population (2021)
  - Total: 22
  - Density: 15/km^{2} (38/sq mi)
- Postal code: 47280

Dvorište Vivodinsko is a village near Ozalj, Karlovac County, Croatia.

== Location ==
It is situated 23 km from Karlovac and 8 km northwest of Ozalj.

== Historical population ==
Population changes
1857	1869	1880	1890	1900	1910	1921	1931	1948	1953	1961	1971	1981	1991	2001	2011
100	116	130	148	138	126	113	129	149	136	113	120	60	78	42	27
