= Tomašnica =

- Village
- Location within Croatia
- Coordinates: 45°32′5″N 15°28′1″E
- Country: Croatia
- County: Karlovac County
- Municipality: Ozalj

Area
  - Total: 5.1 km^{2} (2.0 sq mi)

Population (2021)
  - Total: 138
  - Density: 27/km^{2} (70/sq mi)

Tomašnica is a small village in the Republic of Croatia, in Karlovac County. It is located on the left bank of the Dobra river in a region called Gornje (Upper) Pokuplje, about 10 km from Karlovac towards Netretić. It belongs to the municipality of Ozalj and has a population of 158 (as of the 2011 census).

== Population ==
In 2021, Tomašnica had a population of 138.

== Characteristics ==
Tomašnica is a village in Karlovac County, Croatia, known for its natural surroundings—hills, forests, vineyards, creeks, and springs—and its hospitable people. During World War II 41 residents of Tomašnica lost their lives. The village is connected to the neighboring village of Zadobarje by a wooden bridge.

People from the area around Netretić are often referred to as Brajci. In Tomašnica and the surrounding region, locals speak a mixture of all three Croatian dialects, a mixed dialect known as brajski govor or govor ozaljskog književnog kruga.

Many Tomaščani (people from Tomašnica) now live abroad, particularly in Australia and Canada, and many return to Croatia during the summer to visit their homeland.
