= Gorica Svetojanska =

Coordinates: 45°43′N 15°36′E

- Settlement
- Location within Croatia
- Country: Croatia
- County: Zagreb
- Town: Jastrebarsko

Area
  - Total: 2.5 km^{2} (0.97 sq mi)

Population (2021)
  - Total: 114
  - Density: 46/km^{2} (120/sq mi)
- Time zone: UTC+1 (CET)
  - Summer (DST): UTC+2 (CEST)

Gorica Svetojanska is a settlement in the Jastrebarsko administrative area of Zagreb County, Croatia. As of 2011 it had a population of 116.

== History ==
At the Slavonian Sabor of June 1579 in Zagreb, the dange of leaving the river crossings at Sveti Jakov, Luka and Rečica unguarded was noted, so for their fortification the Sabor allocated workers from the feudal estates of Ozalj, Jastrebarsko, Steničnjak, Završje, Slavetić, Turanj (Sveta Jana) and Kaptol Zagrebački.
