= Furjanići =

- Location of Furjanići in Croatia
- Coordinates: 45.65°N 15.4333°E
- Country: Croatia
- County: Karlovac County
- Municipality: Ozalj

Government
  - Mayor: Biserka Vranić (SDP)

Area
  - Total: 0.7 km^{2} (0.27 sq mi)

Population (2021)
  - Total: 29
  - Density: 41/km^{2} (110/sq mi)
- Postal code: 47280

Furjanići is a village near Ozalj, Karlovac County, Croatia.

== Location ==
It is situated 20 km from Karlovac and 6 km northwest of Ozalj, on the left bank of the river Kupa.

== Historical population ==
Population changes
| 1857 | 1869 | 1880 | 1890 | 1900 | 1910 | 1921 | 1931 | 1948 | 1953 | 1961 | 1971 | 1981 | 1991 | 2001 | 2011 |
| 74 | 81 | 86 | 82 | 82 | 78 | 76 | 78 | 66 | 70 | 77 | 72 | 58 | 52 | 41 | 32 |
