= Slavetić =

Coordinates: 45°42′N 15°33′E

- Settlement
- Location within Croatia
- Country: Croatia
- County: Zagreb
- Town: Jastrebarsko

Area
  - Total: 4.5 km^{2} (1.7 sq mi)

Population (2021)
  - Total: 57
  - Density: 13/km^{2} (33/sq mi)
- Time zone: UTC+1 (CET)
  - Summer (DST): UTC+2 (CEST)

Slavetić is a settlement in the Jastrebarsko administrative area of Zagreb County, Croatia. As of 2011 it had a population of 84 people.

== History ==
At the Slavonian Sabor of June 1579 in Zagreb, the danger of leaving the river crossings at Sveti Jakov, Luka and Rečica unguarded was noted, so for their fortification the Sabor allocated workers from the feudal estates of Ozalj, Jastrebarsko, Steničnjak, Završje, Slavetić, Turanj (Sveta Jana) and Kaptol Zagrebački.

For the fortification of Ivanić in 1598, Turanj (Sveta Jana) and Oršića Grad had to supply 4 carts.
