= Lović Prekriški =

- Interactive map of Lović Prekriški
- Location within Croatia
- Coordinates: 45°39′54″N 15°27′11″E
- Country: Croatia
- County: Karlovac
- City: Ozalj

Area
  - Total: 3.1 km^{2} (1.2 sq mi)

Population (2021)
  - Total: 47
  - Density: 15/km^{2} (39/sq mi)
- Time zone: UTC+1 (CET)
  - Summer (DST): UTC+2 (CEST)

Lović Prekriški is a village in central Croatia, in the administrative area of the city of Ozalj, population 72 (census 2011).

The village is part of the Žumberak nature park and includes the hamlets of Dugi Vrh, Maljani, Malkovići, Žapčići and Careva Draga, four historical church chapel buildings, as well as two archeological zones, Sv. Križ and Grad.
