= Ferenci, Karlovac County =

Ferenci
- Location of Ferenci in Croatia
- Coordinates: 45.612908°N 15.477718°E
- Country: Croatia
- County: Karlovac County
- Town: Ozalj

Area
  - Total: 3.0 km^{2} (1.2 sq mi)

Population (2021)
  - Total: 37
  - Density: 12/km^{2} (32/sq mi)
- Postal code: 47280

Ferenci is a village near Ozalj, Karlovac County, Croatia.

== Location ==
It is situated 20 km (12 mi) from Karlovac and 6 km (3.7 mi) northeast of Ozalj. It lies near the left bank of the river Kupa.

== History ==
Before the signing of the Treaty of Trianon, Ferenci belonged to the Jaska part of Zagreb County.

== Historical population ==
Changes of population
1857	1869	1880	1890	1900	1910	1921	1931	1948	1953	1961	1971	1981	1991	2001	2011
108	158	135	144	175	158	192	218	192	200	208	183	148	111	65	51
