= Fratrovci Ozaljski =

- Location of Fratrovci Ozaljski in Croatia
- Coordinates: 45.622222°N 15.43889°E
- Country: Croatia
- County: Karlovac County
- Town: Ozalj

Area
  - Total: 1.3 km^{2} (0.50 sq mi)

Population (2021)
  - Total: 20
  - Density: 15/km^{2} (40/sq mi)
- Postal code: 47280

Fratrovci Ozaljski is a village in Ozalj, Karlovac County, Croatia. It is situated 17 km from Karlovac. Before the signing of the Treaty of Trianon, it was part of Zagreb County.

Historical population
Year	Pop.	±%
1857	216	—
1869	202	−6.5%
1880	192	−5.0%
1890	198	+3.1%
1900	191	−3.5%
1910	183	−4.2%
1921	169	−7.7%
1931	177	+4.7%
1948	196	+10.7%
1953	191	−2.6%
1961	164	−14.1%
1971	147	−10.4%
1981	114	−22.4%
1991	107	−6.1%
2001	66	−38.3%
2011	48	−27.3%
