= Ribnik, Croatia =

Ribnik
- Municipality
- Municipality of Ribnik; Općina Ribnik
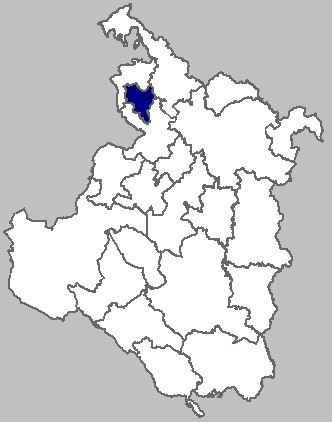
- Map of Ribnik municipality within Karlovac County

- Location of Ribnik in Croatia
- Coordinates: 45.5754°N 15.3514°E
- Country: Croatia
- Region: Central Croatia
- County: Karlovac County

Area
  - Municipality: 40.5 km^{2} (15.6 sq mi)
  - Urban: 5.6 km^{2} (2.2 sq mi)

Population (2021)
  - Municipality: 362
  - Density: 8.94/km^{2} (23.2/sq mi)
  - Urban: 98
  - Urban density: 18/km^{2} (45/sq mi)
- Website: ribnik.hr

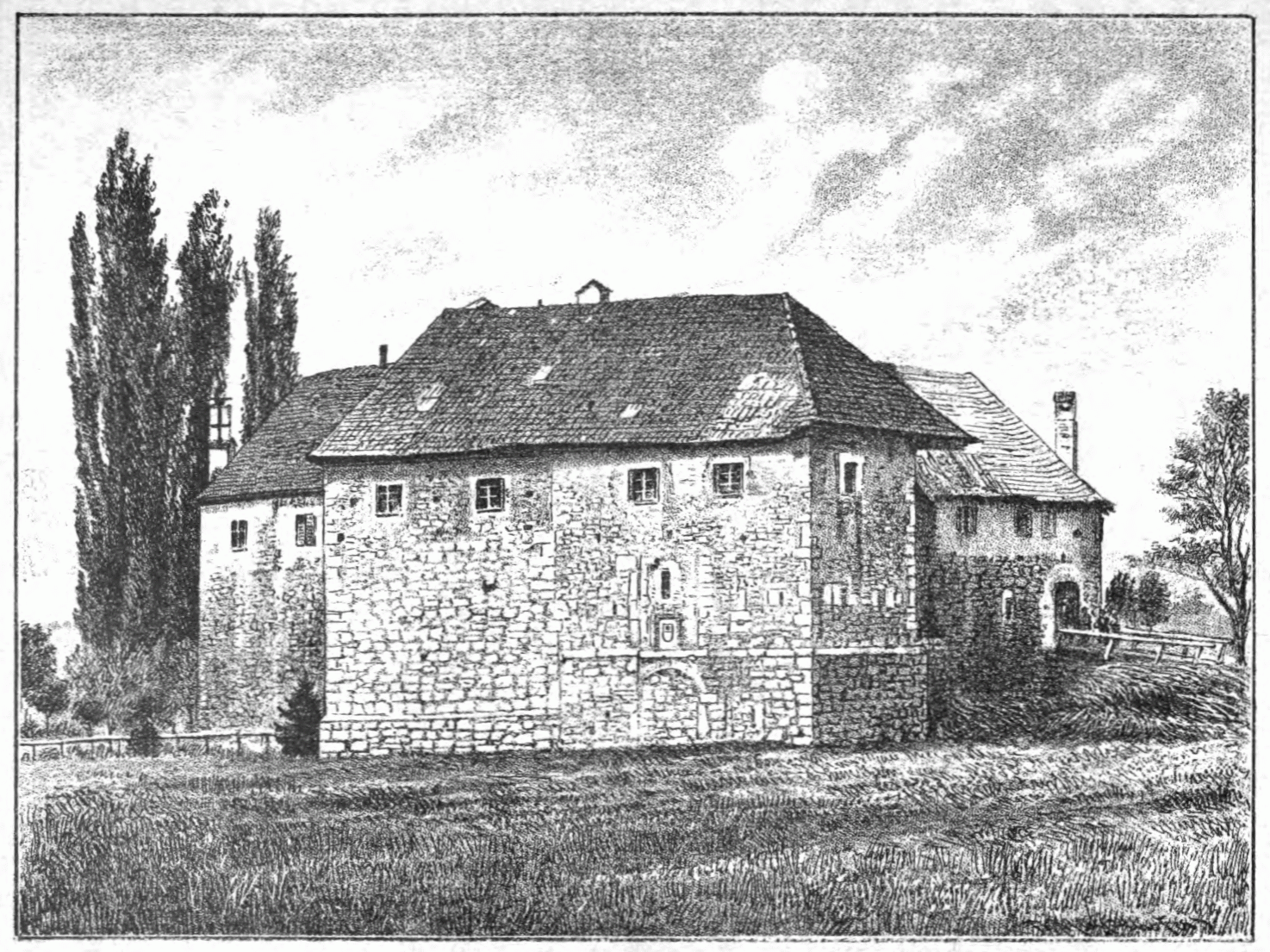
Ribnik Castle

Ribnik is a village and a municipality in Karlovac County, Croatia.

== Name ==
It was recorded as Ribnik on the 1673 map of Stjepan Glavač.

== History ==
Ribnik was mentioned on 22 February 1481 in a document freeing the citizens of Grič from tariffs in Ribnik and elsewhere.

During the fortification of Karlovac in 1588, Ribnik was part of its supply chain, being counted together with Dubovac, Novigrad and Bosiljevo. Ozalj owed the same as all of these four. Each owed 6 carts of timber, and although there were complaints about the conduct of the soldiers stationed in Karlovac, the order was complied with.

== Demographics ==
In the 2011 census, there were a total of 475 inhabitants in the municipality, 98.74% of whom are Croats, in the following settlements:

- Donja Stranica, population 2
- Drenovica Lipnička, population 7
- Gorica Lipnička, population 13
- Gornja Stranica, population 1
- Gornji Goli Vrh Lipnički, population 2
- Griče, population 63
- Jarnevići, population 33
- Jasenovica, population 25
- Lipnik, population 65
- Martinski Vrh, population 21
- Novaki Lipnički, population 16
- Obrh, population 7
- Ravnica, population 15
- Ribnik, population 113
- Skradsko Selo, population 25
- Sopčić Vrh, population 18
- Veselići, population 49

== Governance ==
=== Judiciary ===
Karlovac was once the seat of the kotar court for an 1870 population of 53,148. In 1875, the kotar court of Karlovac was responsible for the općine: Karlovac city, Banija, Rečica, Draganić, Ozalj, Novigrad, Ribnik, Bosiljevo and Severin.

== Bibliography ==
- Melem Hajdarović, Mihela (2023-06-14). "Glavačeva karta Hrvatske iz 1673. – njezini toponimi, geografski sadržaj i historijskogeografski kontekst" [Glavač’s map of Croatia from 1673: Its toponyms, geographical content, and historical-geographical context]. Studia lexicographica. 17 (32): 47–78. doi:10.33604/sl.17.32.2. eISSN 2459-5578.
