= Popovići Žumberački =

- Village
- Location within Croatia
- Coordinates: 45.715°N 15.28°E
- Country: Croatia
- County: Karlovac County
- Municipality: Ozalj

Area
  - Total: 7.2 km^{2} (2.8 sq mi)

Population (2021)
  - Total: 0
  - Density: 0.0/km^{2} (0.0/sq mi)
- Time zone: UTC+1 (CET)
  - Summer (DST): UTC+2 (CEST)

Popovići Žumberački is an uninhabited settlement in Žumberak, on the border of Croatia and Slovenia.
