= Brezovica pri Metliki =

- Interactive map of Brezovica pri Metliki
- Location in Slovenia
- Coordinates: 45°41′28.74″N 15°18′12.18″E
- Country: Slovenia
- Traditional region: White Carniola
- Statistical region: Southeast Slovenia
- Municipality: Metlika

Area
  - Total: 0.77 km^{2} (0.30 sq mi)
- Elevation: 363.8 m (1,194 ft)

Population (2002)
  - Total: 57
- Postal code: 8331

Brezovica pri Metliki (pronounced [ˈbɾéːzɔʋitsa pɾi mɛˈtlìːki]) is a settlement in the Municipality of Metlika in the White Carniola area of southeastern Slovenia, right on the border with Croatia. The area is part of the traditional region of Lower Carniola and is now included in the Southeast Slovenia Statistical Region. It surrounds the small Croatian enclave of Brezovica Žumberačka.

== Name ==
The name of the settlement was changed from Brezovica to Brezovica pri Metliki in 1953.

== History ==
During the Second World War, the Partisans operated an underground mimeograph print shop in a vineyard cottage in Brezovica pri Metliki. The cottage was burned by Anti-Communist Volunteer Militia forces in 1942. On 1 May 1944 the Partisans held a political meeting in the village that was attended by the Allied liaison officer Major William M. Jones, who was also a speaker at the event.

=== Enclave border dispute ===
The local border; green area = Slovenia, yellow line = road

In 2015, the complex border line in this area attracted the attention of the Polish tourist Piotr Wawrzynkiewicz, who learned from Wikipedia that there was a small unclaimed piece of land and claimed it for his micronation, "Kingdom of Enclava". The novelty attracted international media attention at the time. Later, the Slovene Ministry of Foreign Affairs stated that this was Slovenia's territorial claim, also claimed by Croatia, to be resolved by the Permanent Court of Arbitration at The Hague, in which a decision was rendered 29 June 2017. Wawrzynkiewicz then relocated his novelty to an unclaimed Croat-Serb border area.

One enclave (Brezovica Žumberačka) belonging to Croatia had already existed at this location (see diagram). A second enclave was created on 29 June 2017 when the Permanent Court of Arbitration decided that a disputed 2.4 ha parcel adjoining the enclave is part of Slovenia, thus completing the encirclement of the second Croatian enclave. It was this parcel that had been claimed as "Enclava". When the arbitration decision was issued, Croatia refused to implement it.
