= Griče, Slovenia =

Griče
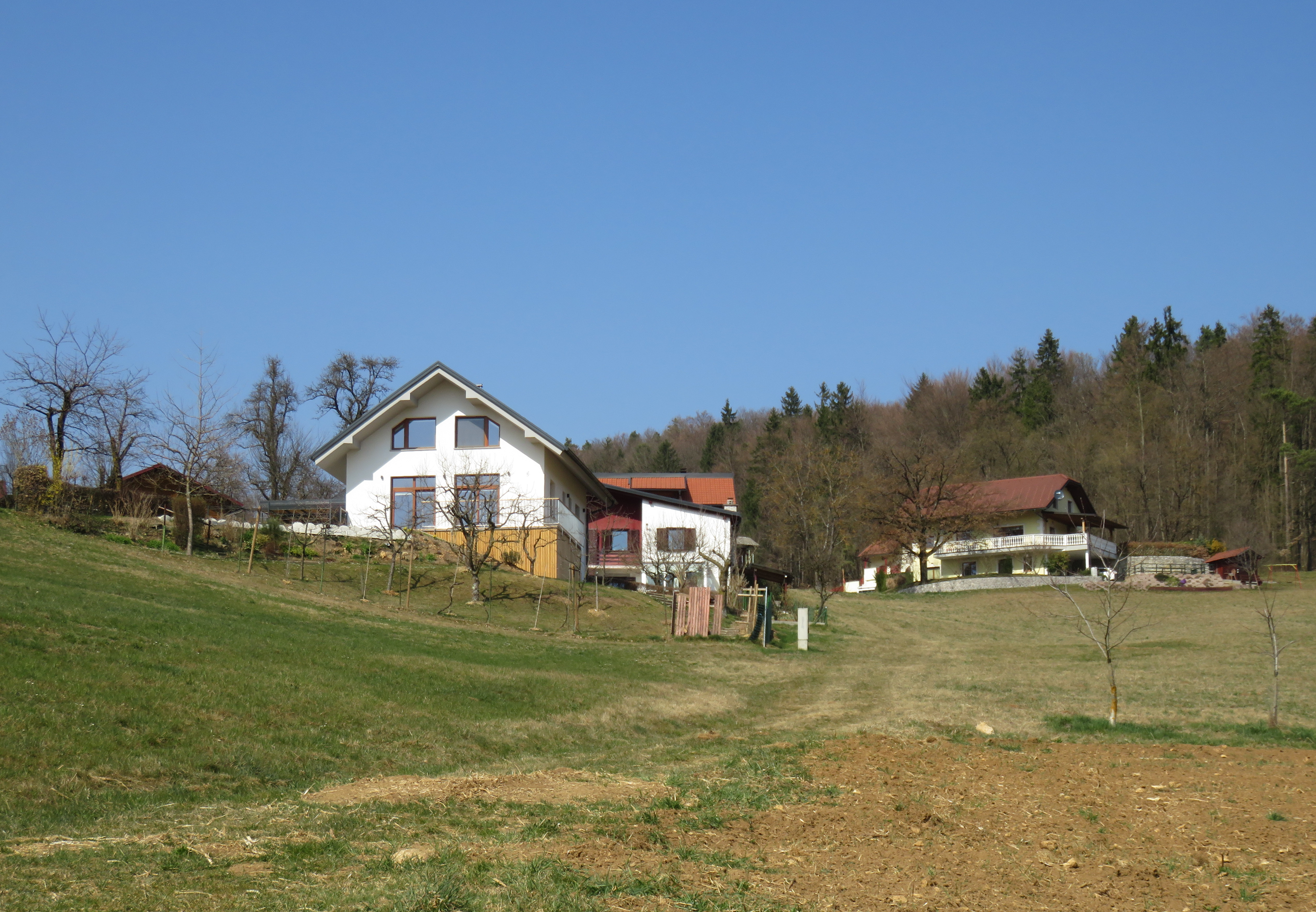

- Location in Slovenia
- Coordinates: 46°8′40″N 14°43′23″E
- Country: Slovenia
- Traditional region: Upper Carniola
- Statistical region: Central Slovenia
- Municipality: Moravče
- Elevation: 409 m (1,342 ft)

Griče (Slovene pronunciation: [ˈɡɾiːtʃɛ], in older sources also Grič, German: Gritsch) is a former settlement in the Municipality of Moravče in central Slovenia. It is now part of the village of Dole pri Krašcah. The area is part of the traditional region of Upper Carniola. The municipality is now included in the Central Slovenia Statistical Region.

== Geography ==
Griče lies in the extreme northeastern part of the village of Dole pri Krašcah, on the border with the territory of neighboring Prikrnica.

== History ==
Griče had a population of three living in one house in 1900. Griče was annexed by Prikrnica in 1952, ending its existence as an independent settlement. Griče became part of Dole pri Krašcah through a territorial adjustment in 2006.
