= Popovich (disambiguation) =

Popovich or Popović is a surname.

Popovich may also refer to:

- Popovich, Varna Province, a village in Bulgaria
- 8444 Popovich, an asteroid
- Popovich Hall, home of the Marshall School of Business at the University of Southern California
- Karina Popovich, founder of Makers for COVID-19
