= Prkos Lasinjski =

- Village
- Location of Prkos Lasinjski in Croatia
- Coordinates: 45°30′18″N 15°48′32″E
- Country: Croatia
- Region: Continental Croatia
- County: Karlovac
- Municipality: Lasinja

Area
  - Total: 5.3 km^{2} (2.0 sq mi)
- Elevation: 146 m (479 ft)

Population (2021)
  - Total: 48
  - Density: 9.1/km^{2} (23/sq mi)
- Time zone: UTC+1 (CET)
  - Summer (DST): UTC+2 (CEST)
- Postal code: 47206 Lasinja
- Area code: (+385) 047

Prkos Lasinjski is a village in central Croatia, in the municipality of Lasinja, Karlovac County.

== History ==
Prkos Lasinjski suffered heavy demographic losses in the World War II with nearly 480 of its residents perishing. Out of those, 428 people were civilian victims of fascism and 23 were fallen partisans. During the WWII Genocide by the Croatian fascist Ustaše regime, on 21 December 1941, hundreds of Serbs from the village were taken to the Brezje forest and massacred.

== Demographics ==
According to the 2011 census, the village of Prkos Lasinjski has 52 inhabitants. This represents 36.62% of its pre-war population according to the 1991 census.

The 1991 census recorded that 92.25% of the village population were ethnic Serbs (131/142), 2.11% were ethnic Croats (3/142), 2.82% were Yugoslavs (4/142), while 2.82% were of other ethnic origin (4/142).

Historical population 1857-2011
v

population				363	403	435	435	570	235	285	288	214	176	142	38	52
	1857	1869	1880	1890	1900	1910	1921	1931	1948	1953	1961	1971	1981	1991	2001	2011

Sources: Croatian Bureau of Statistics publications

== Sights ==
- Memorial to the victims of fascism and fallen partisans in WW2
