= Malo Lešče =

- Interactive map of Malo Lešče
- Location in Slovenia
- Coordinates: 45°41′47.47″N 15°18′33.54″E
- Country: Slovenia
- Traditional region: White Carniola
- Statistical region: Southeast Slovenia
- Municipality: Metlika

Area
  - Total: 0.47 km^{2} (0.18 sq mi)
- Elevation: 382.1 m (1,254 ft)

Population (2002)
  - Total: 29
- Postal code: 8331

Malo Lešče (pronounced [ˈmaːlɔ ˈleːʃtʃɛ]) is a settlement in the Municipality of Metlika in the White Carniola area of southeastern Slovenia, right on the border with Croatia. It is included in the traditional region of Lower Carniola and is now part of the Southeast Slovenia Statistical Region.
