= Ozalj =

- Town
- Grad Ozalj; Town of Ozalj
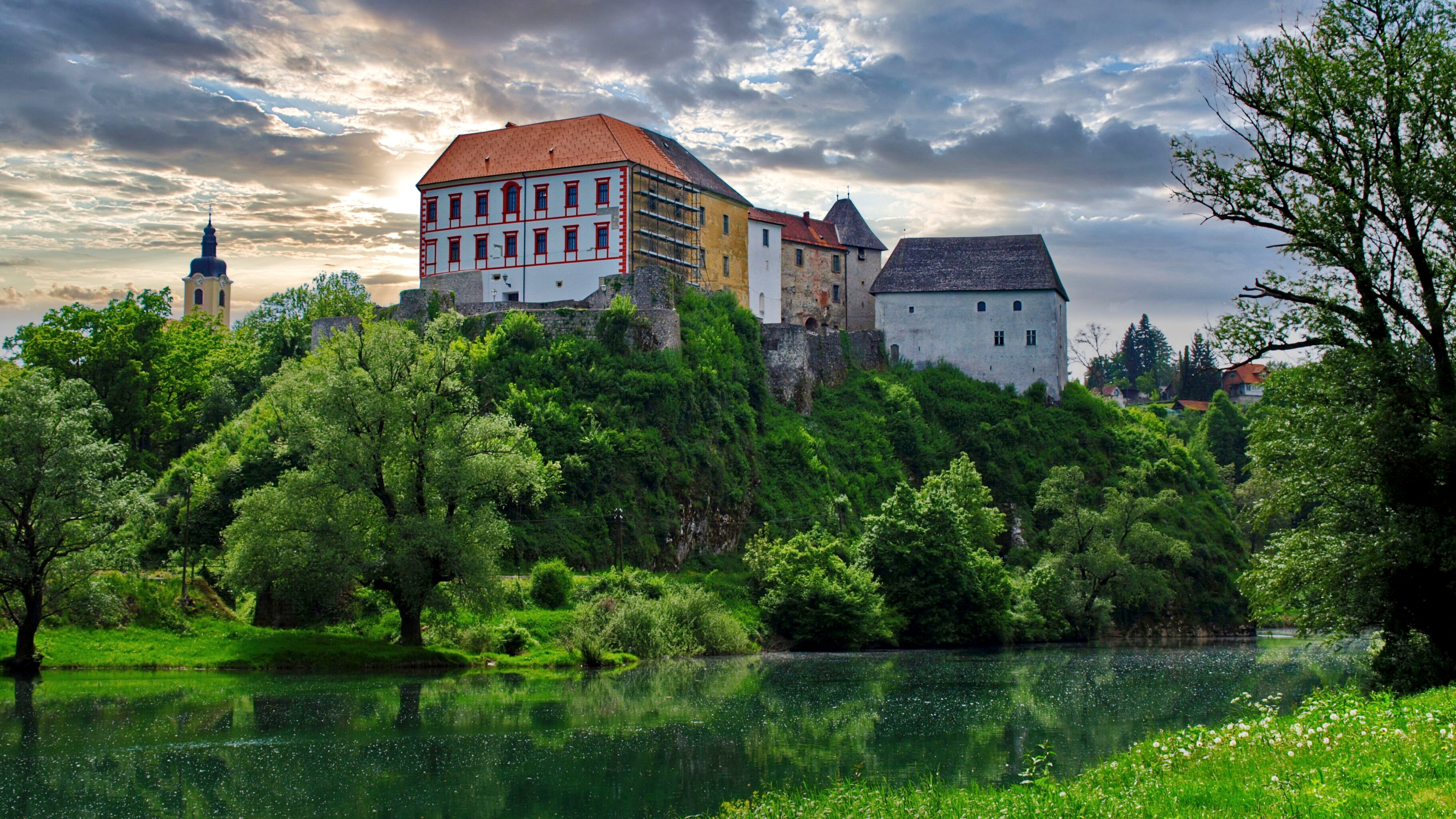
- Ozalj Castle

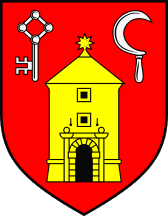
- Seal
- Interactive map of Ozalj
- Location of Ozalj within Croatia
- Coordinates: 45.612908°N 15.477718°E
- Country: Croatia
- Region: Central Croatia (Pokuplje)
- County: Karlovac County

Government
  - Mayor: Lidija Bošnjak (Ind.)

Area
  - Town: 179.4 km^{2} (69.3 sq mi)
  - Urban: 5.7 km^{2} (2.2 sq mi)

Population (2021)
  - Town: 5,837
  - Density: 32.54/km^{2} (84.27/sq mi)
  - Urban: 1,053
  - Urban density: 180/km^{2} (480/sq mi)
- Time zone: UTC+1 (Central European Time)
  - Summer (DST): UTC+2 (CEST)
- Postal code: 47280 Ozalj
- Website: ozalj.hr

Ozalj (Note: pronounced [ôzaʎ], Hungarian: Ozaly, German: Wosail or Woseil) is a town in central Croatia, located north of Karlovac and southwest of Jastrebarsko, on the Kupa River. It is close to Žumberak in the north and the border with Slovenia in the northwest, with Metlika being the closest Slovenian town.

== History ==
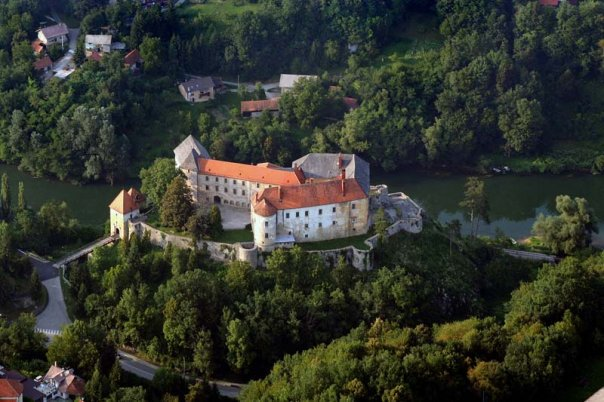
Ozalj Castle

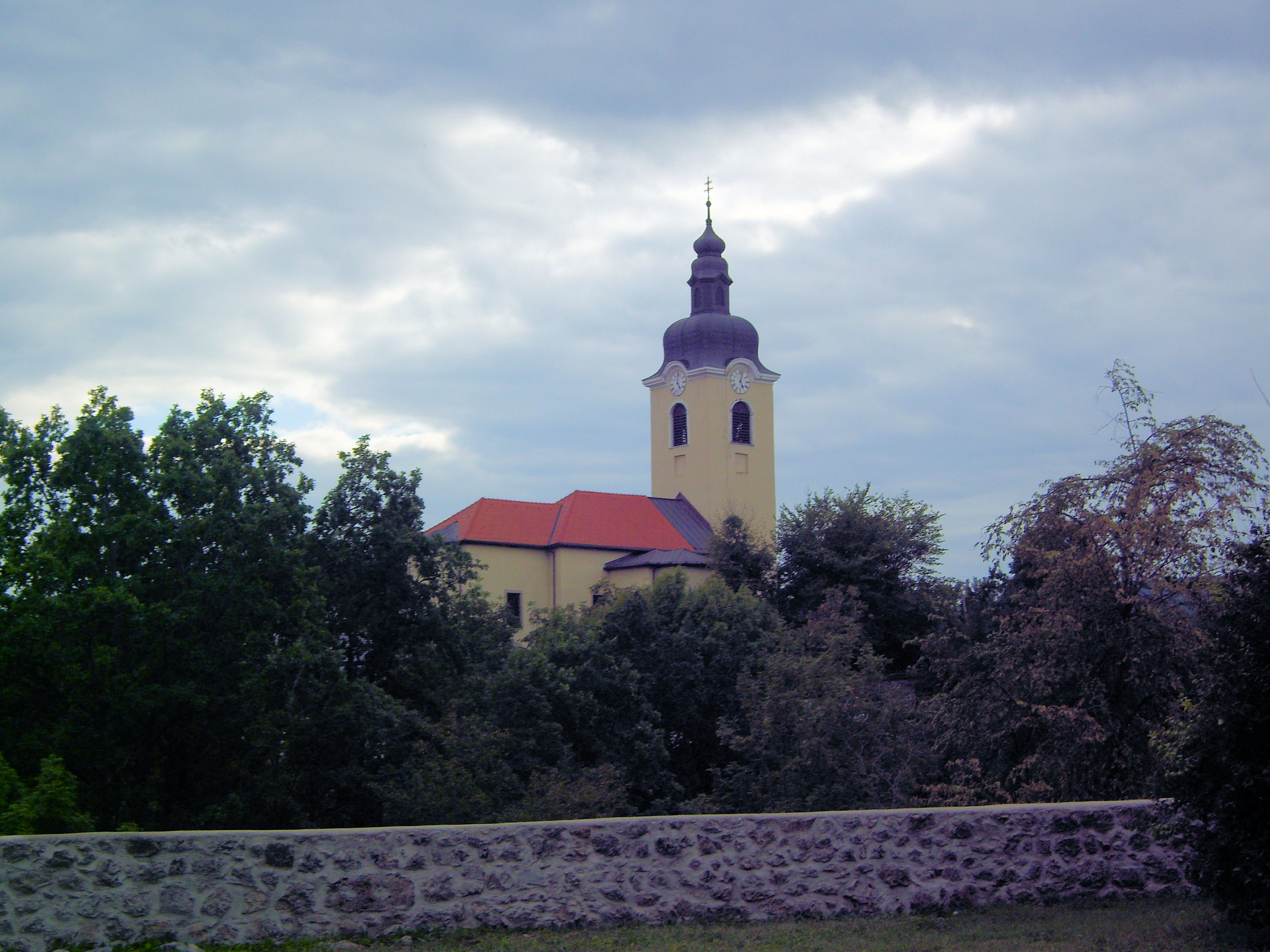
St.Vitus Church

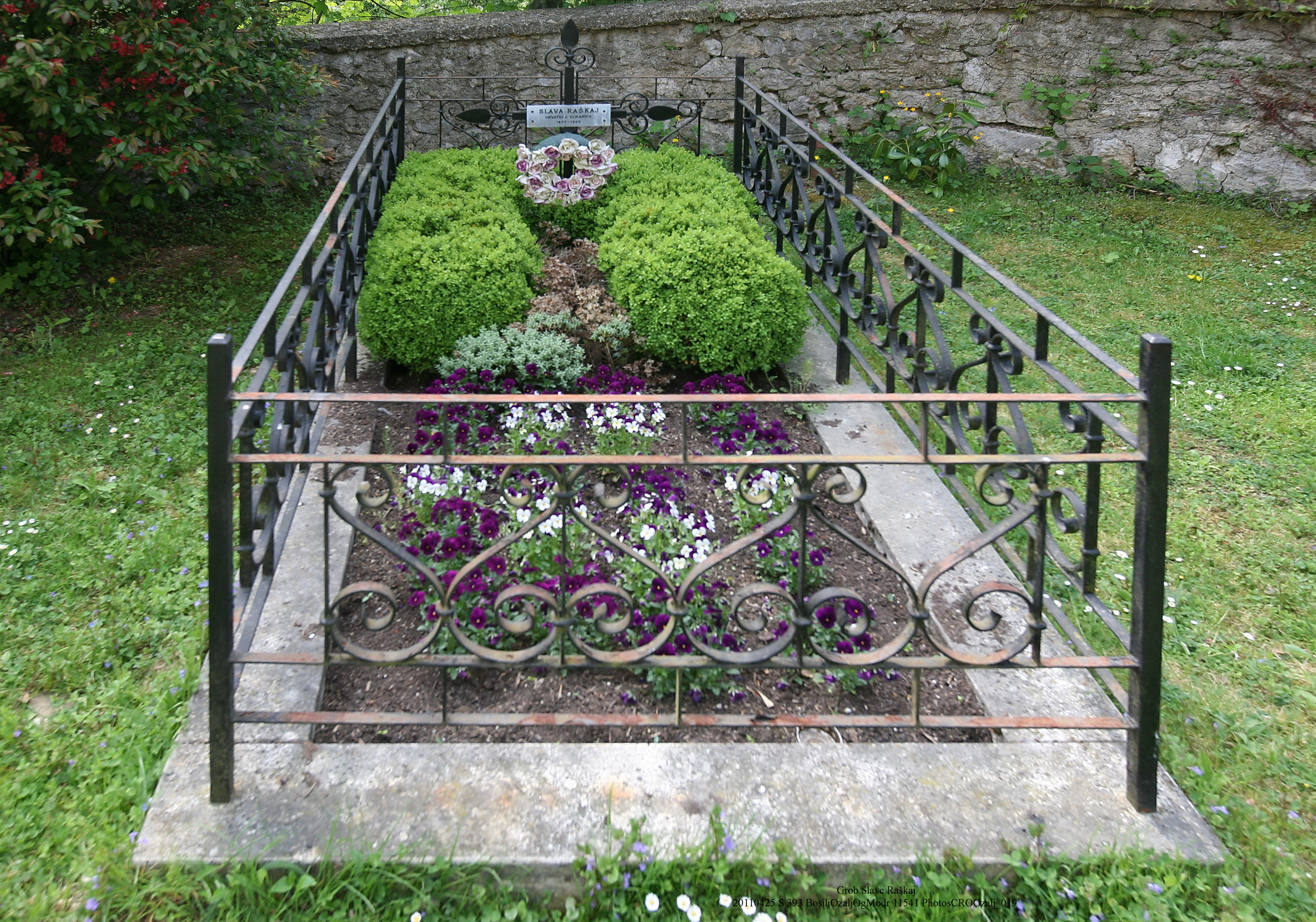
Grave of Slava Raškaj

The town was built on a cliff over the Kupa river and the first mention of it dates from 1244, as a free royal town. The Frankopan family owned it since 1398, then it passed to the Zrinski family in 1550, and it stayed theirs until 1671. The city commemorates 30 April as its day, in memory of the event in 1671 when Petar Zrinski and Fran Krsto Frankopan were executed.

The patron saint of the town is St. Vitus, whose feast is celebrated on 15 June.

== Munjara ==
Munjara is the old hydroelectric plant. This plant has three 3.5 megawatt generators and was built between 1907 and 1908.

== Demographics ==
The town of Ozalj itself has a population of 1,053, with a total of 5,837 people in the municipality. 97.36% of the population are Croats (census 2021).

Town of Ozalj: Population trends 1857–2021
v

population	11780	13354	13610	14309	14126	14047	13574	14839	14769	14432	13125	11634	9744	9988	7932	6817	5837
	1857	1869	1880	1890	1900	1910	1921	1931	1948	1953	1961	1971	1981	1991	2001	2011	2021

Sources: Croatian Bureau of Statistics publications

The administrative area of the Town consists of 96 smaller settlements, the full list of which is (population 2021):

- Badovinci, population 23
- Belinsko Selo, population 2 ▲
- Belošići, population 23 ▲
- Boševci, population 62 ▼
- Brašljevica, population 26 ▼
- Bratovanci, population 44 ▼
- Brezje Vivodinsko, population 6 ▼
- Breznik, population 5 ▼
- Brezovica Žumberačka, population 17 ▼
- Budim Vivodinski, population 10 ▼
- Bulići, population 3 ▲
- Cerje Vivodinsko, population 22
- Cvetišće, population 0
- Dančulovići, population 19 ▼
- Dojutrovica, population 28 ▼
- Doljani Žumberački, population 14 ▼
- Donji Lović, population 11 ▼
- Donji Oštri Vrh Ozaljski, population 45 ▼
- Dragoševci, population 9 ▲
- Dučići, population 29 ▼
- Durlinci, population 69 ▼
- Dvorišće Ozaljsko, population 39 ▼
- Dvorište Vivodinsko, population 22 ▼
- Ferenci, population 37 ▼
- Fratrovci Ozaljski, population 20 ▼
- Furjanići, population 29 ▼
- Galezova Draga, population 25 ▼
- Galin, population 0 ▼
- Goleši Žumberački, population 2 ▼
- Goli Vrh Ozaljski, population 6
- Gorniki Vivodinski, population 22 ▼
- Gornje Pokupje, population 150 ▼
- Gornji Lović, population 27 ▼
- Gornji Oštri Vrh Ozaljski, population 9 ▲
- Goršćaki Ozaljski, population 11
- Grandić Breg, population 37
- Grdun, population 118 ▼
- Gudalji, population 0
- Hodinci, population 29 ▼
- Hrastovica Vivodinska, population 0
- Ilovac, population 42 ▼
- Jaškovo, population 385 ▼
- Kamenci, population 0
- Kašt, population 32 ▼
- Keseri, population 1 ▼
- Kuljaji, population 6 ▼
- Kunčani, population 0
- Levkušje, population 171 ▼
- Liješće, population 28 ▼
- Lović Prekriški, population 47 ▼
- Lukšići Ozaljski, population 46
- Lukunić Draga, population 20 ▼
- Mali Erjavec, population 129 ▼
- Malinci, population 0
- Novaki Ozaljski, population 54 ▼
- Obrež Vivodinski, population 75 ▼
- Ozalj, population 1053 ▼
- Pećarići, population 0 ▼
- Petruš Vrh, population 5 ▼
- Pilatovci, population 19 ▼
- Podbrežje, population 258 ▼
- Podgraj, population 135 ▲
- Police Pirišće, population 74 ▼
- Polje Ozaljsko, population 221 ▼
- Popovići Žumberački, population 0
- Požun, population 34 ▼
- Radatovići, population 15 ▼
- Radina Vas, population 4 ▼
- Rajakovići, population 0
- Rujevo, population 10 ▼
- Sekulići, population 0 ▼
- Slapno, population 241 ▼
- Soldatići, population 15 ▼
- Sršići, population 3 ▼
- Stojavnica, population 21 ▼
- Svetice, population 17 ▼
- Svetičko Hrašće, population 108 ▼
- Šiljki, population 5
- Škaljevica, population 68 ▲
- Tomašnica, population 138 ▼
- Trešćerovac, population 18 ▼
- Trg, population 169 ▼
- Varaštovac, population 7 ▼
- Veliki Erjavec, population 11 ▼
- Vini Vrh, population 2 ▼
- Vivodina, population 75 ▼
- Vrbanska Draga, population 18 ▼
- Vrhovac, population 307 ▼
- Vrhovački Sopot, population 90 ▲
- Vrškovac, population 117 ▼
- Vuketić, population 16 ▼
- Vuksani, population 10 ▲
- Zajačko Selo, population 161
- Zaluka, population 18 ▼
- Zorkovac, population 193 ▼
- Zorkovac Vivodinski, population 14 ▼
- Zorkovac na Kupi, population 81 ▼

== Governance ==
Representatives of the Ozalj kotar at the Croatian Parliament:

- Hinko Francisci (1884–1887)
- Petar Junković (1887–1892)

=== Judiciary ===
Karlovac was once the seat of the kotar court for an 1870 population of 53,148. In 1875, the kotar court of Karlovac was responsible for the općine: Karlovac city, Banija, Rečica, Draganić, Ozalj, Novigrad, Ribnik, Bosiljevo and Severin.

== Notable people ==
- Juraj Križanić (1618–1683), earliest recorded pan-Slavist
- Jelena Zrinski (1643–1703), countess
- Slava Raškaj (1877–1906), painter
- John Malkovich's paternal grandparents, from Malkovići near Lović Prekriški
