= Kotar (subdivision) =

Kotar is a lower administrative-territorial unit or unit of local self-government.

It was used in the Habsburg Monarchy and Austria-Hungary (1848–1918), later in the regions of the Kingdom of Serbs, Croats, and Slovenes (1921–29), banovinas of the Kingdom of Yugoslavia (1929–41) (where it was called a srez), grand župas of the Independent State of Croatia (NDH) (1941–45), and in post-WWII Yugoslavia until 1955.

In Yugoslavia, a kotar consisted of municipalities (Serbo-Croatian: općina). Larger cities were usually not included in the counties but were separate units. After the enactment of the Law on the Organisation of Municipalities and Counties in 1955, the county gradually transformed into a community of municipalities, and its previous powers and territorial scope were taken over by the municipality. Thus, in 1955, the People's Republic of Croatia was divided into 27 counties, and in later years further changes were made to the organization of local government.

The term was used once again in May 1992, when the Croatian Parliament designated two "kotars" as areas of self-governance with a Serbian majority population: Dvor Kotar in Sisak-Moslavina County and Knin Kotar in Zadar-Knin County. Both of these kotars were abolished in 1996.

A city settlement in Croatia can be divided into subdivisions called četvrt (lit. 'quarter') or kotar, and the term is also found in the name of the region of Gorski kotar.

== Bibliography ==
- "Kotar". Hrvatska enciklopedija (in Croatian). Leksikografski zavod Miroslav Krleža. 2021.
