= Settlement (Croatia) =

Third-level administrative subdivision of Croatia

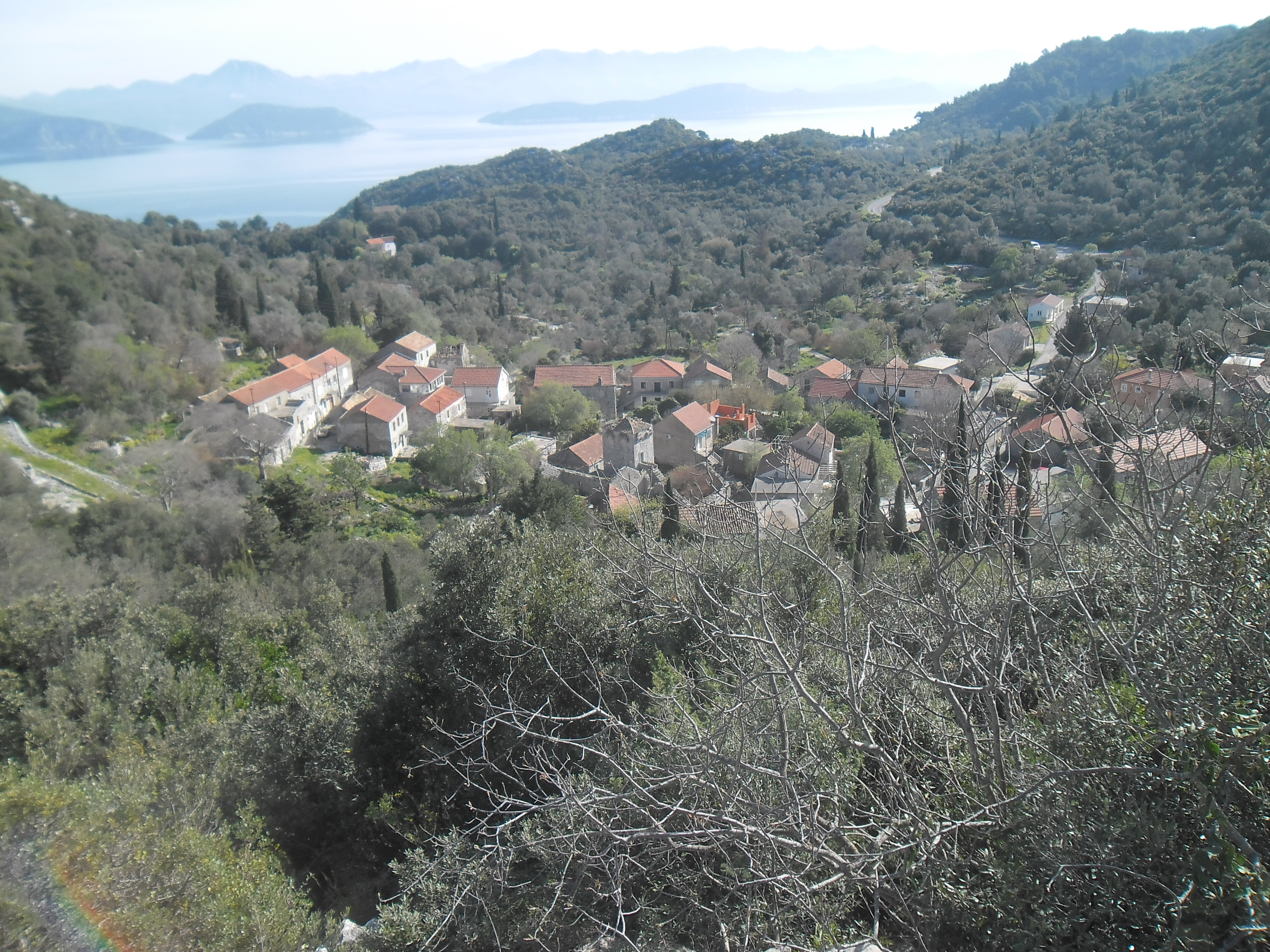
Naselje Korita

Settlements in Croatia, in Croatian naselje (pl. naselja) are the third-level spatial division of the country, and usually indicate existing or former human settlement. Each Croatian city or town (grad, pl. gradovi) or municipality (općina, pl. općine) consists of one or more settlements. A settlement can be part of only one second-level spatial division, whose territory is the sum of exclusive settlement territories. Settlements are not necessarily incorporated places, as second-level local authorities (towns and municipalities), known as jedinice lokalne samouprave, delegate some of their functions to so-called jedinice mjesne samouprave (gradski kotar, gradska četvrt, or područje mjesnog odbora).

The Croatian Bureau of Statistics publishes their decennial census data on the basis of official settlement (naselje) data from the Register of Spatial Units by the State Geodetic Administration. As of 2023, there are 6 757 settlements in Croatia.

Rural individual settlements are usually referred to as selo (village; pl. sela). Municipalities (or communes) in Croatia comprise one or more either urban or rural settlements. A city usually includes an eponymous large settlement and several urban, suburban or rural settlements. A municipality is usually named by the largest or most urban settlement and typically includes several rural settlements. The Constitution of Croatia allows a naselje or a part thereof to form some form of local government. This form of local government is typically used to subdivide larger municipalities and cities; municipality may comprise several units named mjesni odbor (local committee/board), a city usually consists of several units (which may comprise one or more settlements) named gradski kotar/gradska četvrt (city district or borough; pl. gradski kotari/gradske četvrti), and/or mjesni odbor (local committee/board; pl. mjesni odbori).

Historically, the methodology of delineating settlements in Croatia changed substantially in the first decade after World War II, when the number of settlements was recorded at 12,044 in the 1948 census, but then reduced to 6,704 in the 1953 census. At the time, the definition of a settlement was an inhabited place with a separate name, an independent settlement was a settlement that had a distinct territory, and a non-independent one was one that was inside another one's territory. Independent ones therefore included cities, towns, market towns, villages and places where people were settled or colonized.

== See also ==
- Census-designated place
- Cadastral municipality (katastarska općina)
- Kotar (subdivision)
