= Plešivica, Jastrebarsko =

Coordinates: 45°44′N 15°40′E

Plešivica
- Settlement
- Location within Croatia
- Country: Croatia
- County: Zagreb
- Town: Jastrebarsko

Area
  - Total: 3.5 km^{2} (1.4 sq mi)

Population (2021)
  - Total: 269
  - Density: 77/km^{2} (200/sq mi)
- Time zone: UTC+1 (CET)
  - Summer (DST): UTC+2 (CEST)

Plešivica is a settlement in the Jastrebarsko administrative area of Zagreb County, Croatia. As of 2011 it had a population of 292 people.

== Name ==
The name Plješivica is common for mountains and hills with meadows on top, derived from the adjective plešiv "bare, treeless". The toponym can be either a proper noun or an appellative. Other examples of the proper name include:

- Plješivica (mountain range)
- Plješevica on Bukovica by Bilišane (peak group)
- Plišivica on Brdo by Blato na Cetini (peak)
- Plešivica on Brkini by Sežana (peak and village)
- Plišivica on Crnogorka by Banjevci (peak)
- Plišivica on Crnogorka by Pirovaz (peak)
- Plješivica on Dinara by Golubić (mountain and stream)
- Plešivica on Kostelsko gorje by Žužemberk (peak and village)
- Plješivica on Krpelj by Kamensko (peak)
- Plišivica on Labinštica by Prapatnica (peak)
- Plišivica on Orah by Orah (peak)
- Plišivica on Orlice by Vrpolje (peak)
- Plešivica on Ormoško-Ljutomerska gora by Ljutomer (peak and village)
- Plišivica on Prača by Ljubitovica (peak)
- Pleševica on Velebit by Jablanac (sub-range)
- Plišivica on Svilaja by Zelovo (mountain)
- Plješivica (1634 m) on Velebit by Krasno (peak)
- Pljišivica (1560 m) on Velebit by Krasno (peak)
- Plješevica on Zagrebačka gora by Velika Gora (peak)
- Plešivica on Žumberak by Jastrebarsko (sub-range and village)
- Plješivica on Žumberak by Gornje Prekrižje (peak)
- Plešivica on Žumberak by Noršić Selo (peak)
- Plišivica by Mitlo (hill)
- Plešivica by Čukovec (hamlet)
- Plješevica by Donje Sokolovo (mountain)
- Plišivica by Donji Muć (hill)
- Pleševica by Ervenik (hill)
- Pleševica by Jazvenik (field)
- Plišivica by Kladnjice (mountain)
- Plješevica by Kožlovac (hill)
- Plješivica by Plavno (mountain)
- Plješivica by Radašinovci (peak)
- Plešivica by Severin (village)
- Plešivica by Selnica (hill and village)
- Plješevica by Rogatica (village)
- Plišivica by Tribunj (hill)
- Plješevica by Trijebovo (peak)
