= Lička Plješivica =

Mountain of the Dinaric Alps in Croatia

Plješivica
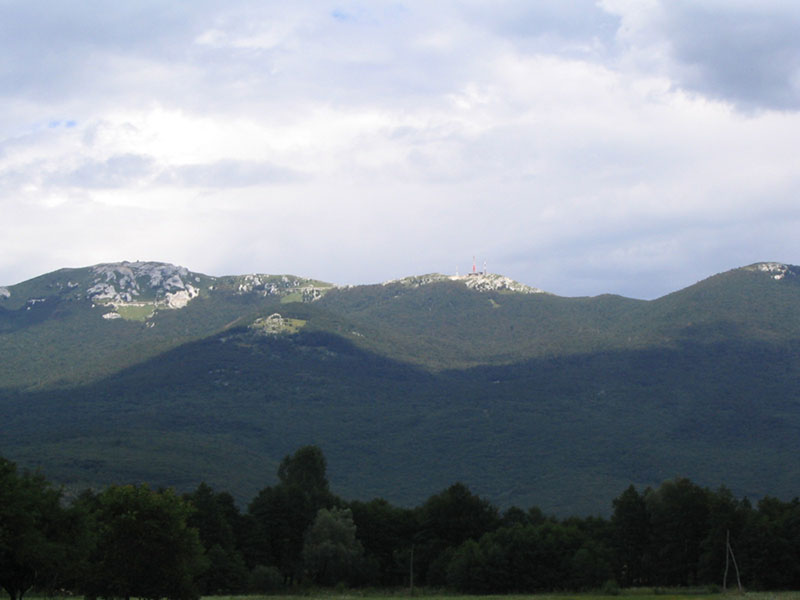

Highest point
- Peak: Ozeblin
- Elevation: 1,657 m (5,436 ft)
- Coordinates: 44.578861°N 15.875944°E

Geography
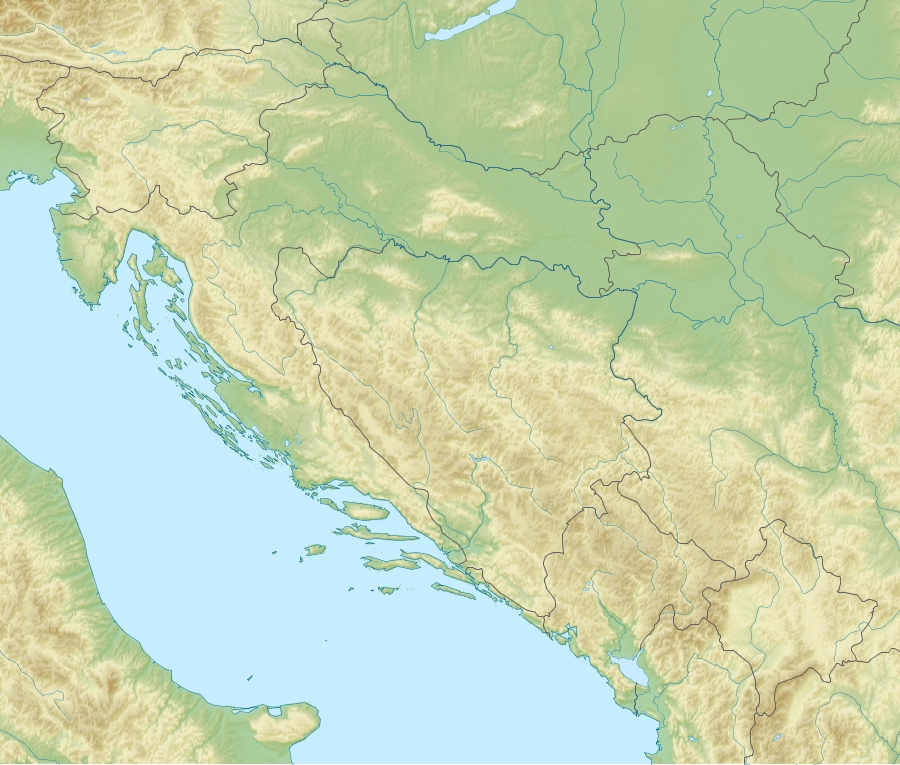
- Location within Dinaric Alps
- Location: Croatia, Bosnia and Herzegovina
- Parent range: Dinaric Alps

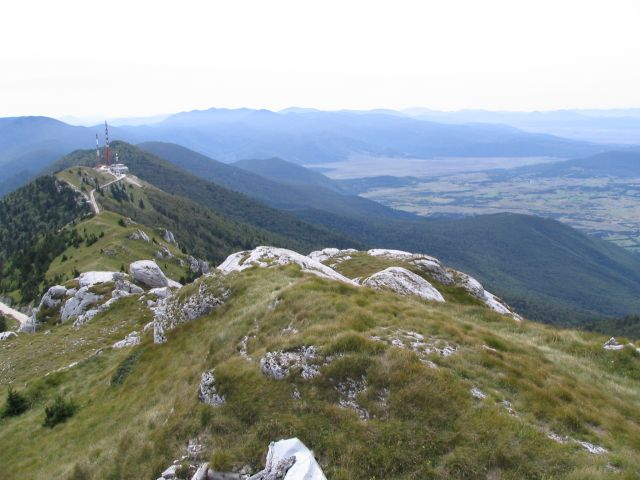
Lička Plješivica: view from Gola Plješivica

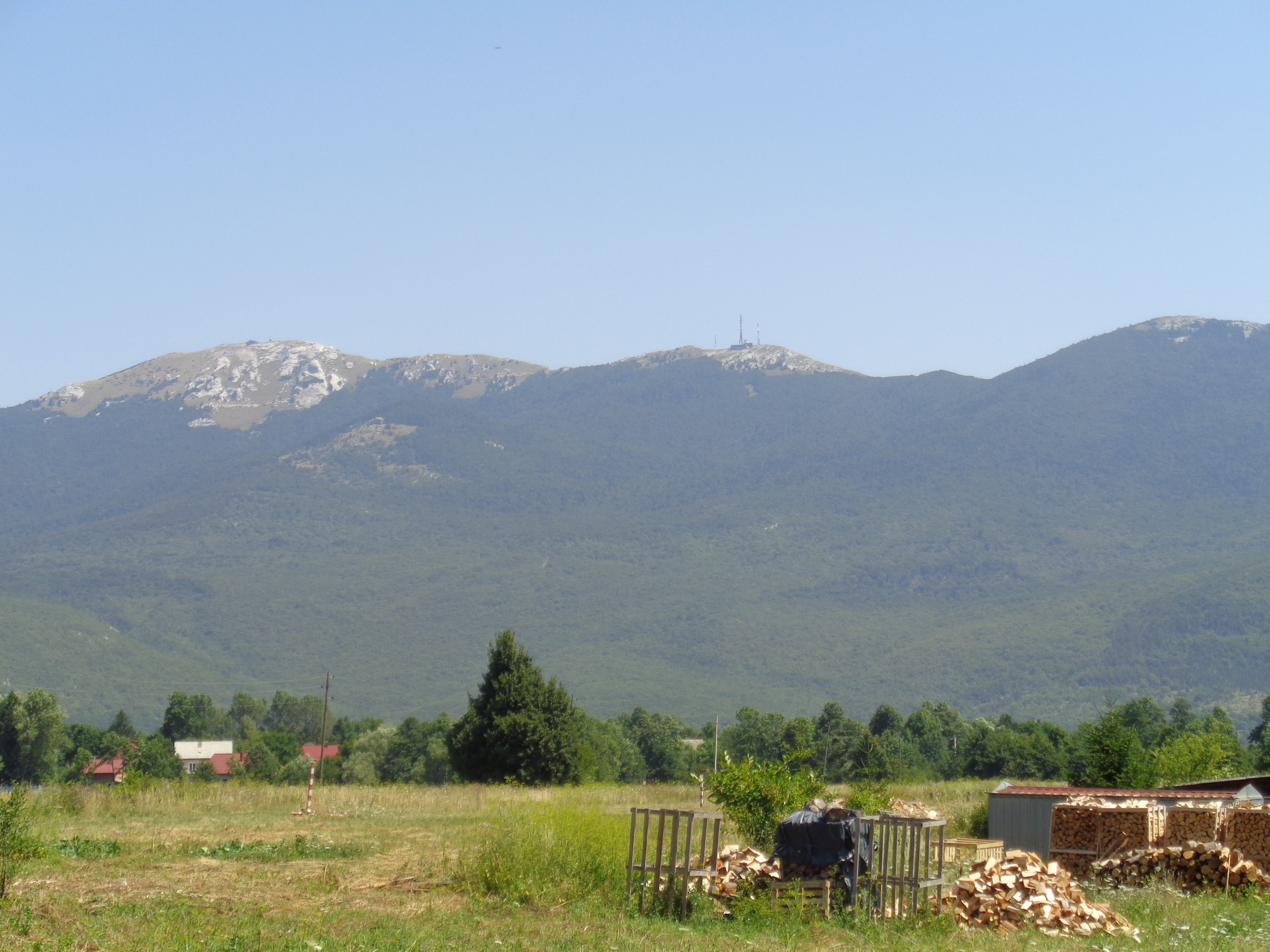
Lička Plješivica: view from Korenica

Plješevica (pronounced [pʎɛ̌ʃɛʋitsa]), also called Lička Plješivica (i.e., "Plješivica of Lika"), is a mountain located on the border between Bosnia and Herzegovina and Croatia, and is part of the Dinaric Alps.

== Name ==
The name Plješivica is common for mountains and hills with meadows on top, derived from the adjective plešiv "bare, treeless". The toponym can be either a proper noun or an appellative. Other examples of the proper name include:

- Plješevica on Bukovica by Bilišane (peak group)
- Plišivica on Brdo by Blato na Cetini (peak)
- Plešivica on Brkini by Sežana (peak and village)
- Plišivica on Crnogorka by Banjevci (peak)
- Plišivica on Crnogorka by Pirovaz (peak)
- Plješivica on Dinara by Golubić (mountain and stream)
- Plešivica on Kostelsko gorje by Žužemberk (peak and village)
- Plješivica on Krpelj by Kamensko (peak)
- Plišivica on Labinštica by Prapatnica (peak)
- Plišivica on Orlice by Vrpolje (peak)
- Plešivica on Ormoško-Ljutomerska gora by Ljutomer (peak and village)
- Plišivica on Prača by Ljubitovica (peak)
- Pleševica on Velebit by Jablanac (sub-range)
- Plišivica on Svilaja by Zelovo (mountain)
- Plješivica (1634 m) on Velebit by Krasno (peak)
- Pljišivica (1560 m) on Velebit by Krasno (peak)
- Plješevica on Zagrebačka gora by Velika Gora (peak)
- Plešivica on Žumberak by Jastrebarsko (sub-range and village)
- Plješivica on Žumberak by Gornje Prekrižje (peak)
- Plešivica on Žumberak by Noršić Selo (peak)
- Plišivica by Mitlo (hill)
- Plešivica by Čukovec (hamlet)
- Plješevica by Donje Sokolovo (mountain)
- Plišivica by Donji Muć (hill)
- Pleševica by Ervenik (hill)
- Pleševica by Jazvenik (field)
- Plišivica by Kladnjice (mountain)
- Plješevica by Kožlovac (hill)
- Plješivica by Plavno (mountain)
- Plješivica by Radašinovci (peak)
- Plešivica by Severin (village)
- Plešivica by Selnica (hill and village)
- Plješevica by Rogatica (village)
- Plišivica by Tribunj (hill)
- Plješevica by Trijebovo (peak)
- Plišivica on Orah by Orah (peak)

== Geography ==
Plješivica is part of the Dinaric Alps, and it stretches in the northwest–southeast direction, extending from Bihać at its northwesternmost point and the mountain pass that separates it from Mala Kapela, along the Krbava field on Croatian side to the southwest and the Una River valley around Ripač on the Bosnian side to the northeast, continuing upstream along the Una by making its canyon southwestern slopes and ending near Donji Lapac.

Inside the north parts of the mountain there used to be the Željava Air Base, the largest underground airbase in SFR Yugoslavia. On the top of Gola Plješevica there was military complex with intercept and surveillance radar "Celopek".

The highest peaks:

- Ozeblin at 1,657 meters, in the south-central part of the mount, located between Udbina and Donji Lapac
- Gola Plješevica at 1,646 meters, located in the northern part, between Bihać and Korenica
- Tabla at 1,613 meters and Trovrh at 1,602 meters, in the north-central region, between Bjelopolje and Melinovac
- Crni vrh at 1,604 meters and Rudi Lisac at 1,608 meters, to the south of Ozeblin

A bit further to the south of Plješivica is Kremen at 1,591 meters. A categorization of the highest points of Croatia by professor Vladimir Volenec, first published in 1990 and revised in 2015, has combined the latter peak into the massif of Plješivica. The area in the south of Ozeblin and east of Kremen also includes other mountain tops like Javornik (1,292 m), Jasenov vrh (1,279 m), Razboj (Paverov vrh 1,269 m) and Strma Čemernica (Gutešin vrh 1,416 m).

To the west is Mrsinj at 1,268 meters.

== Climate ==
Between 1981 and 1988, the highest temperature recorded at the Plješevica weather station was 27.5 °C (81.5 °F), on 28 July 1983. The coldest temperature was −23.5 °C (−10.3 °F), on 7 January 1985.

== Bibliography ==
=== Alpinism ===
- Poljak, Željko (February 1959). "Lička Plješivica". Kazalo za "Hrvatski planinar" i "Naše planine" 1898—1958 (PDF). Naše planine. Vol. XI. pp. 13–14. ISSN 0354-0650.

=== Biology ===
- Šašić, Martina; Nahirnić, Ana; Tarmann, Gerhard M. (2016-12-31). "Zygaenidae (Lepidoptera) in the Lepidoptera collections of the Croatian Natural History Museum". Natura Croatica: Periodicum Musei Historiae Naturalis Croatici. 25 (2): 233–248. doi:10.20302/NC.2016.25.19. eISSN 1848-7386.
