= Plešivica =

Plešivica may refer to:

== Croatia ==
- Plešivica, Selnica, a village near Selnica, Međimurje County
- Plešivica, Primorje-Gorski Kotar County, a village near Vrbovsko
- Plešivica, Jastrebarsko, a village in Zagreb County
- Plešivica (mountain), a mountain of the Žumberak range

== Slovenia ==
- Plešivica, Brezovica
- Plešivica, Ljutomer
- Plešivica, Sežana
- Plešivica, Žužemberk
