= Ivančići =

Ivančići may refer to:

- Ivančići, Bosnia and Herzegovina, a village near Ilijaš
- Ivančići, Croatia, a village near Jastrebarsko
