= Volujak =

Volujak (Serbian Cyrillic: Волујак) may refer to:

- Volujak, Kreševo, a village in Bosnia and Herzegovina
- Volujak (mountain), mountain on the border of Bosnia and Herzegovina and Montenegro
- Volujak, Kosovo, hamlet in Kosovo
- Maja e Vjelakut, in Kosovo
- Voluyak, a village in Sofia City Province, Bulgaria

== See also ==
- Goljak
