= Plešivec =

Plešivec may refer to:

- Plešivec, Slovakia
- Plešivec, Velenje, Slovenia
- Plešivec (Ore Mountains), Czech Republic
- Pleshivets (scientific transliteration Plešivec), a village in Ruzhintsi municipality, Vidin Province, Bulgaria
- Plešivica, Ljutomer, Slovenia, named Plešivec in older sources
