= Zdihovo =

Zdihovo may refer to:

- Zdihovo, Kočevje, an abandoned settlement near Kočevje, Slovenia
- Zdihovo, Zagreb County, a village near Jastrebarsko, Croatia
- Zdihovo, Primorje-Gorski Kotar County, a village near Vrbovsko, Croatia
