= Cvetković, Jastrebarsko =

Coordinates: 45°39′N 15°39′E

- Settlement
- Location within Croatia
- Country: Croatia
- County: Zagreb
- Town: Jastrebarsko

Population (2011)
  - Total: 616
- Time zone: UTC+1 (CET)
  - Summer (DST): UTC+2 (CEST)

Cvetković is a settlement in the Jastrebarsko administrative area of Zagreb County, Croatia. As of 2011 it had a population of 616.
