= Desinec =

Desinec may refer to:

- Desinec, Croatia, is a group of two villages northeast of Jastrebarsko in central Croatia
- Desinec, Slovenia, a settlement in the Črnomelj municipality in southeastern Slovenia
