= Sava Sekulić =

Sava Sekulić Сава Секулић
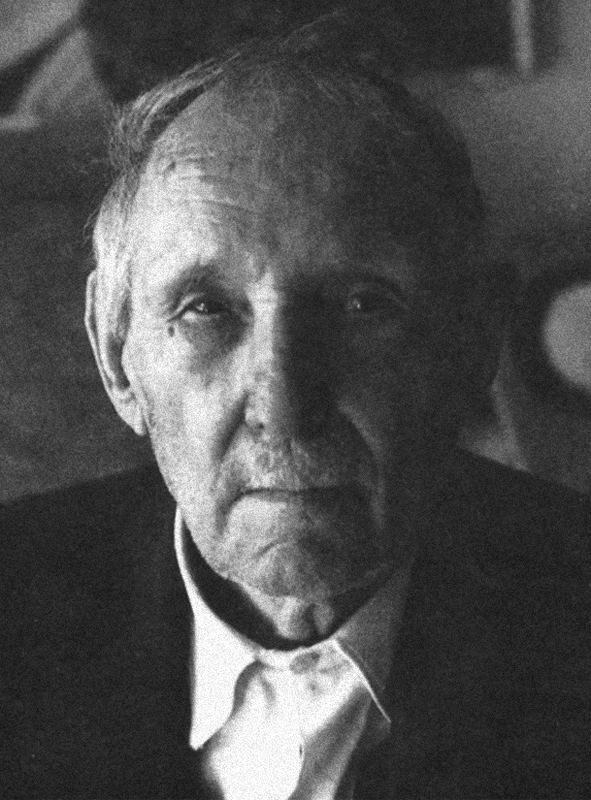
- Portrait of Sava Sekulić
- Born: Sava Sekulić; 17 February 1902; Bilišane, Kingdom of Dalmatia, Austria-Hungary
- Died: 26 January 1989 (aged 86); Belgrade, SR Serbia, Yugoslavia
- Known for: Painter
- Movement: Outsider art, Naïve art

Sava Sekulić (Serbian Cyrillic: Сава Секулић; 17 February 1902 – 26 January 1989) was a Serbian Naïve and Outsider art painter.

== Biography ==
He was born in the village of Bilišane in Dalmatinska Zagora near Obrovac, as a Serb in the Kingdom of Dalmatia, in 1902. His father died when he was 10 years old, after which his mother remarried, and Sekulić was raised by his uncle and his aunt. He did not attended formal schooling; He learnt to read and write from his father. Sekulić used to quote his father's last words: "Learn by yourself, draw and write with a stone in your hand". During World War I, he was injured at the age of 15, and lost one eye. He began writing poetry at the age of 22 and started painting in 1932, although he did not devoted himself exclusively to painting. In 1943, during World War II he worked as a builder. After his retirement in 1962, Sekulić increasingly focused on painting as well as his poetry, using visual art to further develop his poetic ideas. As a self-taught artist, his work reflects his personal and associative approach. He died in Belgrade, Serbia, in 1989.

== Artistic style ==
Sekulić painting style is described as universal, timeless and limitless. His work tends towards generalization, moving from the individual towards the universal. His paintings are associated with L'art brut style, both within Serbia and worldwide. Allegories and metaphors appear in most of his works. With his visions, he reduced a unique pictorial definition, and minimized the subject matter to a metaphor. Most of his works are compositions of human figures, portraits and scenes with historical and beings. While painting historical people, he portrayed the victims as heroes, and members of his family as mythological creatures. However, his most complex figure is a woman.

Many of his works are philosophical stories and moralizing lessons. Figures are simplified, flat and highly stylised. In the background of every painting is an original story derived from numerous popular legends and beliefs such as: pagan, Christian, mythological, historical or contemporary. The myths, with the pronounced respect for animals, primordial parents and beliefs on summing up people and animals, are presented in his paintings by duplication and compaction of human and animal figures (such as fish, bird, horse, cow, snake, octopus, deer, bull or he-goat), multiplication of heads and limbs. The artist prefigured the symbiosis of anthropomorphic and zoomorphic figures, where all the alchemy of his pictorial expression is clearly visible. Paradoxically, Sekulić's style counteracts the narrative aspect of the painting and concentrates exclusively on the pictorial value, with the strength on an unconscious neo-primitive.

His style has been described as characterised by a "restricted palette". He often painted surfaces with different applications of transparent colours, one over the other, without waiting for the earlier layer to dry, resulting in the blending and assimilation of colours. In his paintings, a single dominant colour often prevailed, which sometimes created a monochromatic effect. He occasionally only partly painted the background, thus leaving areas of the surfaces unpainted. By doing so, Sekulić eliminated any illusion of spatial depth.

Sekulić's paintings are characterized by several inventive features, including a blending of the real and the surreal, often with elements resembling automatism. His work places strong emphasis on perception, which may shape how viewers engage with it. For some observers, the subtle structure of purely pictorial phenomena may not be immediately apparent; it can initially be perceived as visual intrigue and later invite deeper intellectual interpretation. Sava Sekulić is regarded as a notable Serbian outsider and naïve painter, and his work has received recognition beyond his national context.

== Exhibitions and awards ==
He participated in independent and group shows in Serbia (Belgrade, Aranđelovac, Jagodina, Niš, Novi Sad) and overseas, presenting in main international exhibitions such as in: Munich, Paris, Cologne. He was awarded globally for his work, including posthumously at the Fifth World Triennial of Naïve and Marginal Art IN SITA in Bratislava, 2000. His most significant works are preserved in the collections of Museum of Naïve and Marginal Art - MNMA, Jagodina, Serbia and in the Zander Collection, Cologne, Germany.

Recent exhibitions

- 2021 Berlin, Galerie Michael Haas, Von Sava zu Sava. Sava Sekulić (2 July - 28 August)
- 2019 Belgrade, Gallery RTS, Intuition at the Margins (24 October – 20 November)
- 2018 Belgrade, Cvijeta Zuzorić Art Pavilion, Magic vitality of the marginal (18 – 30 October)
- Belgrade, House of King Peter I, Self-Taught Visionaries of Serbia (27 March - 10 April*)
- 2017 Paris, Halle Saint Pierre, Turbulences dans les Balkans (7 September 2017 – 31 July)
- 2016 Bönnigheim, Zander Collection, 27 Artists, 209 Works. (23 March – 19 January 2017)
- 2016 Belgrade, Heritage House, Sava Sekulić, the Self-taught (20 October - 12 November)
- 2015 Bönnigheim, Zander Collection, CCC – Sava Sekulić Self-Taught (1 November - 21 February 2016)
- 2003 New York, Phyllis Kind Gallery, Sava Sekulić (12 September - 25 October)
- 2001 Köln, Galerie Susanne Zander, Sava Sekulić (22 June - 28 July)
- 1998 Bönnigheim, Museum Charlotte Zander, Sava Sekulić (7 March - 16 June)
- Belgrade, Gallery of Central Military Club, Art in Spiritual Exile (29 May - 15 July)
- Prague, Gallery of Luka Praha Museum, THE ART OF OUTSIDERS IN SERBIA (9 April – 30 April)

== Gallery ==
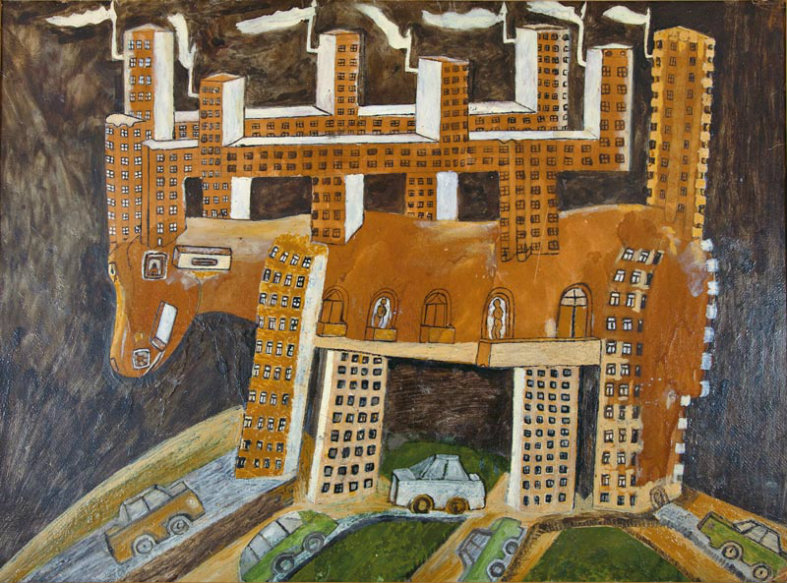
Deer-City, 1948, MNMA, Jagodina

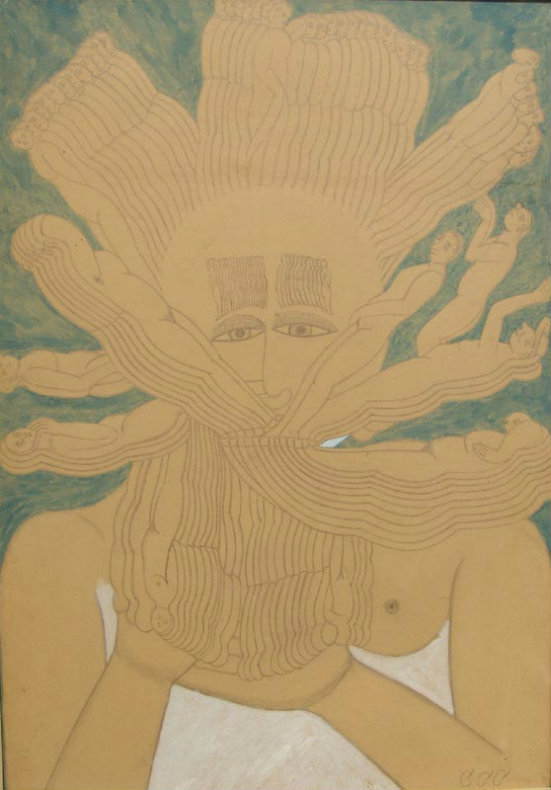
When everyone takes their own, 1965, MNMA, Jagodina

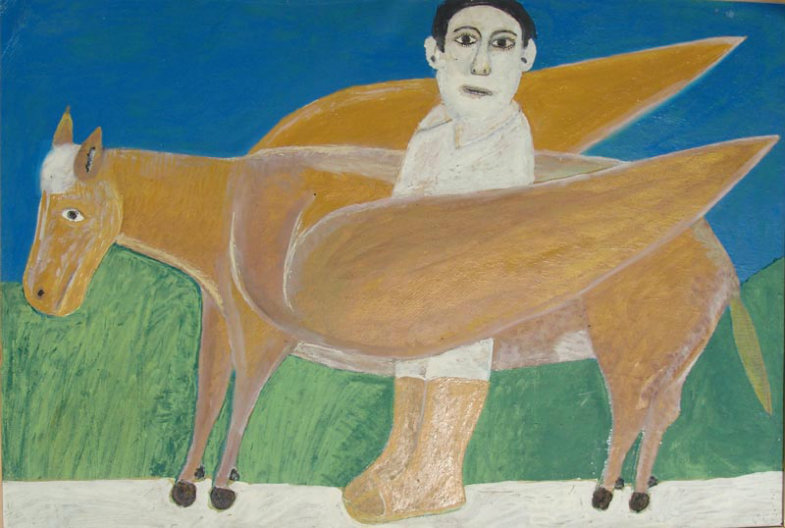
Jabučilo and Momčilo, 1974, MNMA, Jagodina

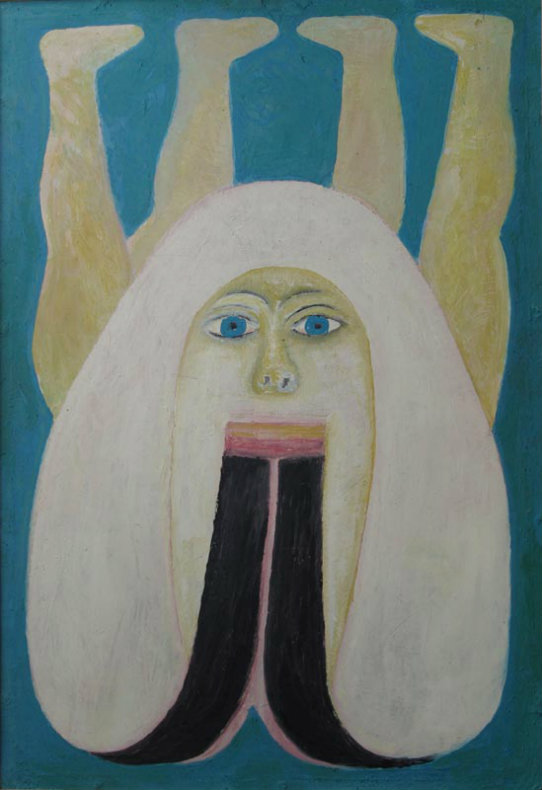
Nature Walks over the Sky, 1974, MNMA, Jagodina

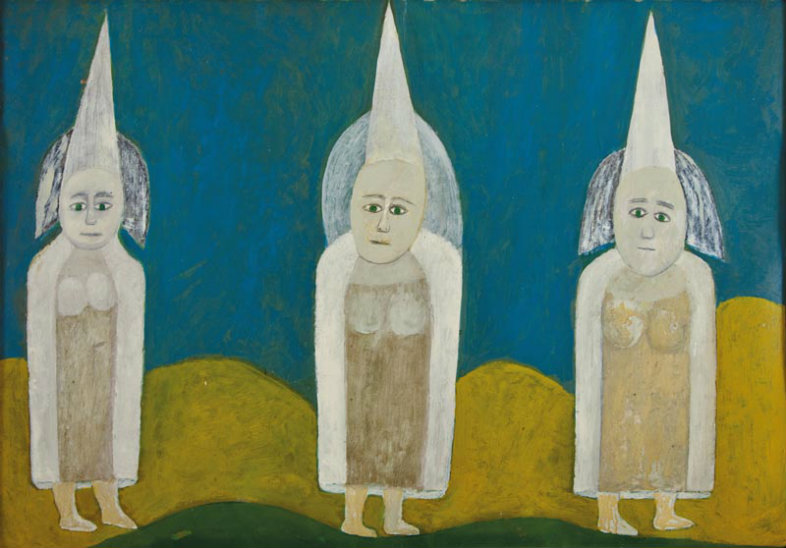
The Germ of Life, 1974, MNMA, Jagodina

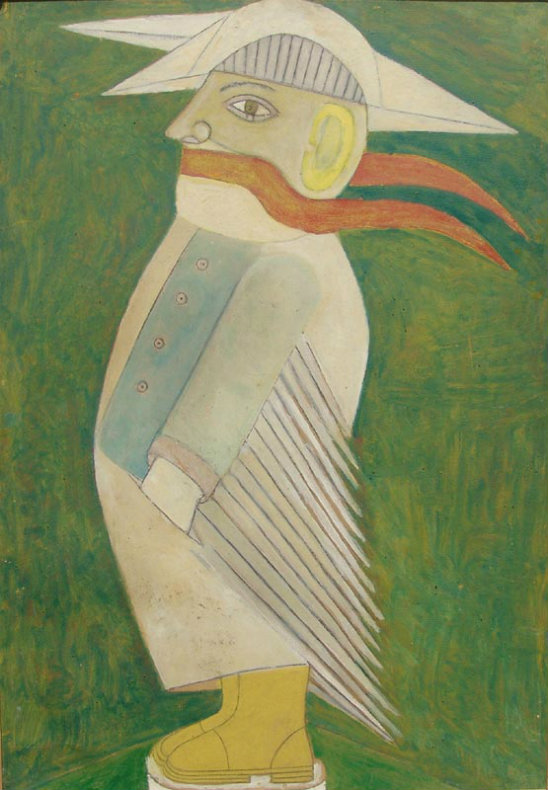
Ancient Slav, 1975, MNMA, Jagodina

== Literature ==
- Bošković M., Maširević M. (Eds.) (1977, p. 74, 78) Naïfs artist in Serbia. Eskenaziarte: Torino.
- Bose, Günter Karl, Zander, Charlotte (Ed.) (1993), Sava Sekulić, Berlin: Brinkmann & Bose.
- Krstić N. (Ed.) (2003, p. 100) Naïve art in Serbia. SASA: Belgrade - MNMA: Jagodina.
- Krstić N. (Ed.) (2007) Naïve and Marginal art in Serbia. MNMA: Jagodina. ISBN 978-86-84403-49-2
- Krstić N. (Ed.) (2013) Outsiders. Catalogue. MNMA, Jagodina.
- Krstić N. (Ed.) (2014, pp. 120–129) Outsider art in Serbia. MNMA: Jagodina.
- Zander, Susanne (Ed.) (2023). 26 Artists. Works from the Zander Collection. Cologne: Verlag der Buchhandlung Walther und Franz König. p. 229.
