= Goljak =

Goljak may refer to:

- Goljak (region), a region in Kosovo and Serbia
- Goljak (mountain), a mountain on the border of Kosovo and Serbia
- Goljak, Croatia, a village near Jastrebarsko
