= Donji Desinec =

Coordinates: 45°41′N 15°43′E

- Settlement
- Location within Croatia
- Country: Croatia
- County: Zagreb
- Town: Jastrebarsko

Area
  - Total: 11.2 km^{2} (4.3 sq mi)

Population (2021)
  - Total: 737
  - Density: 65.8/km^{2} (170/sq mi)
- Time zone: UTC+1 (CET)
  - Summer (DST): UTC+2 (CEST)

Donji Desinec is a settlement in the Jastrebarsko administrative area of Zagreb County, Croatia. As of 2011 it had a population of 799.
