= Redovje =

- Settlement
- Location within Croatia
- Coordinates: 45°42′N 15°41′E
- Country: Croatia
- County: Zagreb
- Town: Jastrebarsko

Area
  - Total: 0.7 km^{2} (0.27 sq mi)

Population (2021)
  - Total: 26
  - Density: 37/km^{2} (96/sq mi)
- Time zone: UTC+1 (CET)
  - Summer (DST): UTC+2 (CEST)

Redovje is a settlement in the Jastrebarsko administrative area of Zagreb County, Croatia. As of 2011 it had a population of 29 people.
