= Dolanjski Jarak =

- Settlement
- Location within Croatia
- Country: Croatia
- County: Zagreb
- Town: Jastrebarsko

Area
  - Total: 0.4 km^{2} (0.15 sq mi)

Population (2021)
  - Total: 23
  - Density: 58/km^{2} (150/sq mi)
- Time zone: UTC+1 (CET)
  - Summer (DST): UTC+2 (CEST)

Dolanjski Jarak is a settlement in the Jastrebarsko administrative area of Zagreb County, Croatia. As of 2011 it had a population of 32.
