= Lokošin Dol =

Coordinates: 45°42′N 15°39′E

- Settlement
- Location within Croatia
- Country: Croatia
- County: Zagreb
- Town: Jastrebarsko

Area
  - Total: 0.5 km^{2} (0.19 sq mi)

Population (2021)
  - Total: 95
  - Density: 190/km^{2} (490/sq mi)
- Time zone: UTC+1 (CET)
  - Summer (DST): UTC+2 (CEST)

Lokošin Dol is a settlement in the Jastrebarsko administrative area of Zagreb County, Croatia. As of 2011 it had a population of 95 people.
