= Hrašća =

- Settlement
- Location within Croatia
- Coordinates: 45°38′24″N 15°43′12″E
- Country: Croatia
- County: Zagreb
- Town: Jastrebarsko

Area
  - Total: 3.9 km^{2} (1.5 sq mi)

Population (2021)
  - Total: 70
  - Density: 18/km^{2} (46/sq mi)
- Time zone: UTC+1 (CET)
  - Summer (DST): UTC+2 (CEST)

Hrašća is a settlement in the Jastrebarsko administrative area of Zagreb County, Croatia. As of 2011 it had a population of 86 people.
