= Srednjak =

- Settlement
- Location within Croatia
- Coordinates: 45°41′58″N 15°35′38″E
- Country: Croatia
- County: Zagreb
- Town: Jastrebarsko

Area
  - Total: 1.1 km^{2} (0.42 sq mi)

Population (2021)
  - Total: 29
  - Density: 26/km^{2} (68/sq mi)
- Time zone: UTC+1 (CET)
  - Summer (DST): UTC+2 (CEST)

Srednjak is a settlement in the Jastrebarsko administrative area of Zagreb County, Croatia. As of 2011 it had a population of 45 people.
