= Rastoki =

- Settlement
- Location within Croatia
- Coordinates: 45°42′N 15°44′E
- Country: Croatia
- County: Zagreb
- Town: Jastrebarsko

Area
  - Total: 1.4 km^{2} (0.54 sq mi)

Population (2021)
  - Total: 100
  - Density: 71/km^{2} (180/sq mi)
- Time zone: UTC+1 (CET)
  - Summer (DST): UTC+2 (CEST)

Rastoki is a settlement in the Jastrebarsko administrative area of Zagreb County, Croatia. As of 2011 it had a population of 109 people.
