= Tihočaj =

Coordinates: 45°45′N 15°33′E

- Settlement
- Location within Croatia
- Country: Croatia
- County: Zagreb
- Town: Jastrebarsko

Area
  - Total: 2.7 km^{2} (1.0 sq mi)

Population (2021)
  - Total: 1
  - Density: 0.37/km^{2} (0.96/sq mi)
- Time zone: UTC+1 (CET)
  - Summer (DST): UTC+2 (CEST)

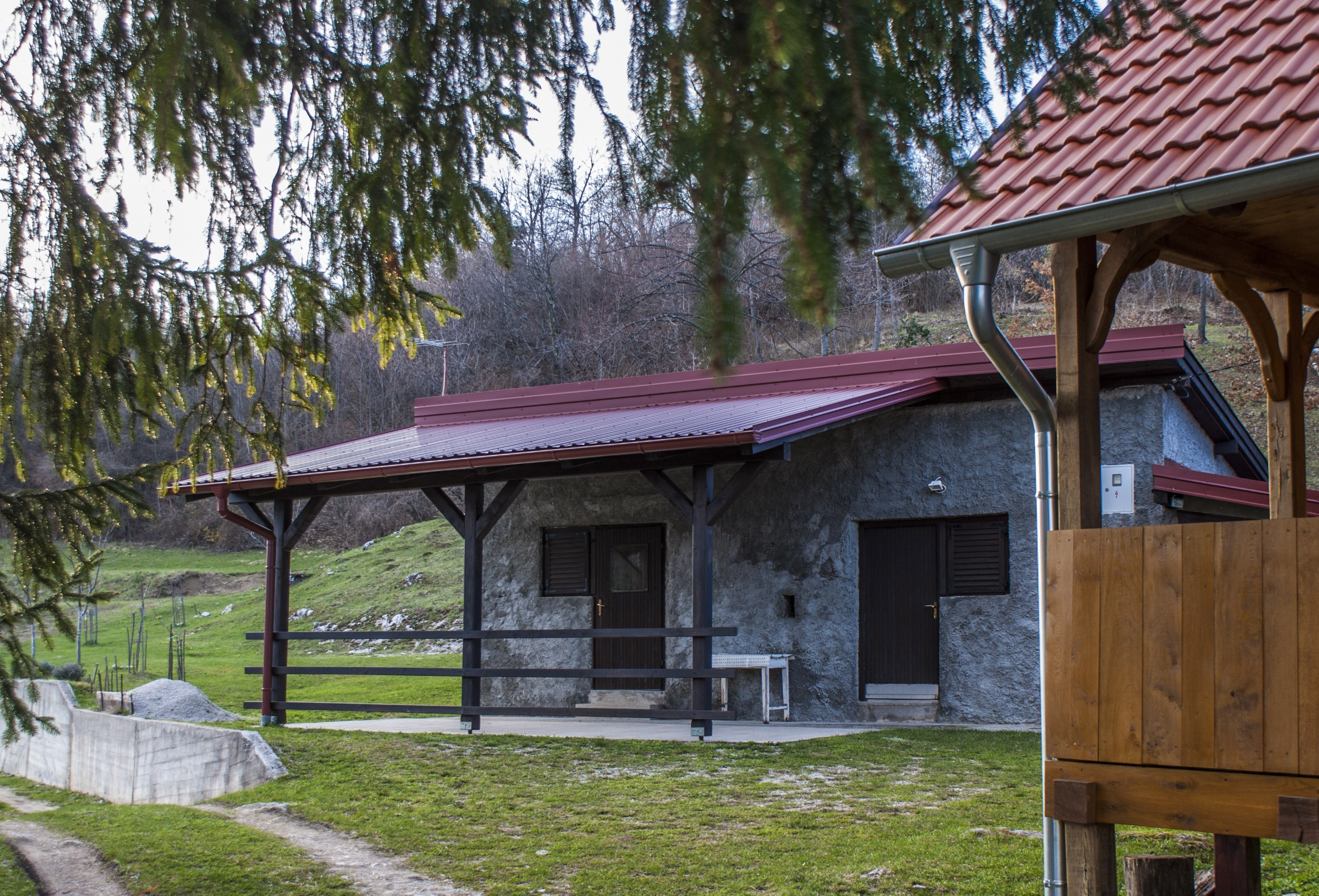
Tihočaj village

Tihočaj is a settlement in the Jastrebarsko administrative area of Zagreb County, Croatia. As of 2021 it has a population of 1.
