= Boris Klemenić =

Croatian politician

Mayor of Jastrebarsko
- In office Jun 21, 2001 – May 17, 2009
- Succeeded by: Mihael Zmajlović

Member of the Croatian Parliament
- In office January 12, 2008 – December 22, 2011

Personal details
- Born: April 30, 1964 (age 61) Zagreb, Croatia
- Party: Croatian Peasant Party (HSS)
- Children: two children
- Profession: Politician

Boris Klemenić is a former mayor of Jastrebarsko, a city in the Croatian Zagreb County, and a member of the sixth assembly of the Croatian Parliament. The mayor of the city Jastrebarsko was elected in two terms, first in Jun 2001, and second in May 2005. He is affiliated with the Croatian Peasant Party (HSS). He formed part of the parliament following new elections in 2007, but he officially became a member on January 12, 2008 as the deputy of Božidar Pankretić.
