= Volavje =

Coordinates: 45°39′N 15°37′E

- Settlement
- Location within Croatia
- Country: Croatia
- County: Zagreb
- Town: Jastrebarsko

Area
  - Total: 6.2 km^{2} (2.4 sq mi)

Population (2021)
  - Total: 374
  - Density: 60/km^{2} (160/sq mi)
- Time zone: UTC+1 (CET)
  - Summer (DST): UTC+2 (CEST)

Volavje is a settlement in the Jastrebarsko administrative area of Zagreb County, Croatia. As of 2011 it had a population of 398 people.
