= Domagović =

Coordinates: 45°38′N 15°38′E

- Settlement
- Location within Croatia
- Country: Croatia
- County: Zagreb
- Town: Jastrebarsko

Area
  - Total: 9.2 km^{2} (3.6 sq mi)

Population (2021)
  - Total: 483
  - Density: 52/km^{2} (140/sq mi)
- Time zone: UTC+1 (CET)
  - Summer (DST): UTC+2 (CEST)

Domagović is a settlement in the Jastrebarsko administrative area of Zagreb County, Croatia. As of 2011 it had a population of 7689
