= Jurjevčani =

- Settlement
- Location within Croatia
- Coordinates: 45°43′48″N 15°39′24″E
- Country: Croatia
- County: Zagreb
- Town: Jastrebarsko

Area
  - Total: 2.3 km^{2} (0.89 sq mi)

Population (2021)
  - Total: 79
  - Density: 34/km^{2} (89/sq mi)
- Time zone: UTC+1 (CET)
  - Summer (DST): UTC+2 (CEST)

Jurjevčani is a settlement in the Jastrebarsko administrative area of Zagreb County, Croatia. As of 2011 it had a population of 99 people.
