= Miladini =

Coordinates: 45°42′N 15°36′E

- Settlement
- Location within Croatia
- Country: Croatia
- County: Zagreb
- Town: Jastrebarsko

Area
  - Total: 1.0 km^{2} (0.39 sq mi)

Population (2021)
  - Total: 50
  - Density: 50/km^{2} (130/sq mi)
- Time zone: UTC+1 (CET)
  - Summer (DST): UTC+2 (CEST)

Miladini is a settlement in the Jastrebarsko administrative area of Zagreb County, Croatia. As of 2011 it had a population of 58 people.
