= Stankovo, Croatia =

Stankovo
- Settlement
- Location within Croatia Location within Europe
- Coordinates: 45°42′42″N 15°42′01″E
- Country: Croatia
- County: Zagreb
- Town: Jastrebarsko

Population (2011)
  - Total: 370
- Time zone: UTC+1 (CET)
  - Summer (DST): UTC+2 (CEST)

Stankovo, Croatia is a settlement in the Jastrebarsko administrative area of Zagreb County, Croatia. As of 2011 it had a population of 370 people.
