= Belčići =

Coordinates: 45°42′1.0″N 15°35′16.6″E

- Settlement
- Location within Croatia
- Country: Croatia
- County: Zagreb
- Town: Jastrebarsko

Area
  - Total: 0.7 km^{2} (0.27 sq mi)

Population (2021)
  - Total: 70
  - Density: 100/km^{2} (260/sq mi)
- Time zone: UTC+1 (CET)
  - Summer (DST): UTC+2 (CEST)

Belčići is a settlement in the Jastrebarsko administrative area of Zagreb County, Croatia. As of 2011 it had a population of 91.
