= Špigelski Breg =

Coordinates: 45.7260°N 15.5823°E

- Settlement
- Location within Croatia
- Country: Croatia
- County: Zagreb
- Town: Jastrebarsko

Area
  - Total: 2.5 km^{2} (0.97 sq mi)

Population (2021)
  - Total: 0
  - Density: 0.0/km^{2} (0.0/sq mi)
- Time zone: UTC+1 (CET)
  - Summer (DST): UTC+2 (CEST)

Špigelski Breg is an uninhabited settlement in the Jastrebarsko administrative area of Zagreb County, Croatia with a population of 0.
