= Toplice, Croatia =

- Settlement
- Country: Croatia
- County: Zagreb
- Town: Jastrebarsko

Population (2011)
  - Total: 96
- Time zone: UTC+1 (CET)
  - Summer (DST): UTC+2 (CEST)

Toplice, Croatia is a settlement in the Jastrebarsko administrative area of Zagreb County, Croatia. As of 2011 it had a population of 96 people.
