= Pavlovčani =

- Settlement
- Location within Croatia
- Country: Croatia
- County: Zagreb
- Town: Jastrebarsko

Area
  - Total: 2.6 km^{2} (1.0 sq mi)

Population (2021)
  - Total: 292
  - Density: 110/km^{2} (290/sq mi)
- Time zone: UTC+1 (CET)
  - Summer (DST): UTC+2 (CEST)

Pavlovčani is a settlement in the Jastrebarsko administrative area of Zagreb County, Croatia. As of 2011 it had a population of 290 people.
