= Hrastje Plešivičko =

Coordinates: 45°41′N 15°41′E

- Settlement
- Location within Croatia
- Country: Croatia
- County: Zagreb
- Town: Jastrebarsko

Area
  - Total: 1.4 km^{2} (0.54 sq mi)

Population (2021)
  - Total: 193
  - Density: 140/km^{2} (360/sq mi)
- Time zone: UTC+1 (CET)
  - Summer (DST): UTC+2 (CEST)

Hrastje Plešivičko is a settlement in the Jastrebarsko administrative area of Zagreb County, Croatia. As of 2021 it has a population of 193 people.
