= Gračac Slavetićki =

Coordinates: 45°44′N 15°31′E

- Settlement
- Location within Croatia
- Country: Croatia
- County: Zagreb
- Town: Jastrebarsko

Area
  - Total: 1.9 km^{2} (0.73 sq mi)

Population (2021)
  - Total: 0
  - Density: 0.0/km^{2} (0.0/sq mi)
- Time zone: UTC+1 (CET)
  - Summer (DST): UTC+2 (CEST)

Gračac Slavetićki is a settlement in the Jastrebarsko administrative area of Zagreb County, Croatia. As of 2011 it had a population of 5.
