= Čabdin =

Coordinates: 45°39′N 15°40′E

- Settlement
- Location within Croatia
- Country: Croatia
- County: Zagreb
- Town: Jastrebarsko

Area
  - Total: 18.6 km^{2} (7.2 sq mi)

Population (2021)
  - Total: 112
  - Density: 6.02/km^{2} (15.6/sq mi)
- Time zone: UTC+1 (CET)
  - Summer (DST): UTC+2 (CEST)

Čabdin is a settlement in the Jastrebarsko administrative area of Zagreb County, Croatia. As of 2011 it had a population of 139.

== History ==
The settlement was first mentioned as a farm in 1249 as a "terra Chebden". In 1783, he appeared on the map of the first military survey as "Dorf Cserdin". It belongs to the parish of St. Nicholas in Jaška. The village had 127 inhabitants in 1857 and 194 in 1910. Before Trianon, it belonged to the Jaskai district in Zagreb County. In 2001, it had 172 inhabitants.
