= Bukovac Svetojanski =

- Settlement
- Location within Croatia
- Country: Croatia
- County: Zagreb
- Town: Jastrebarsko

Area
  - Total: 1.6 km^{2} (0.62 sq mi)

Population (2021)
  - Total: 74
  - Density: 46/km^{2} (120/sq mi)
- Time zone: UTC+1 (CET)
  - Summer (DST): UTC+2 (CEST)

Bukovac Svetojanski is a settlement in the Jastrebarsko administrative area of Zagreb County, Croatia. As of 2011 it had a population of 85.
