= Gornja Reka =

- Settlement
- Location within Croatia
- Country: Croatia
- County: Zagreb
- Town: Jastrebarsko

Area
  - Total: 2.9 km^{2} (1.1 sq mi)

Population (2021)
  - Total: 335
  - Density: 120/km^{2} (300/sq mi)
- Time zone: UTC+1 (CET)
  - Summer (DST): UTC+2 (CEST)

Gornja Reka is a settlement in the Jastrebarsko administrative area of Zagreb County, Croatia. As of 2011 it had a population of 359.
