= Gornji Desinec =

Coordinates: 45°42′N 15°42′E

- Settlement
- Location within Croatia
- Country: Croatia
- County: Zagreb
- Town: Jastrebarsko

Area
  - Total: 2.4 km^{2} (0.93 sq mi)

Population (2021)
  - Total: 600
  - Density: 250/km^{2} (650/sq mi)
- Time zone: UTC+1 (CET)
  - Summer (DST): UTC+2 (CEST)

Gornji Desinec is a settlement in the Jastrebarsko administrative area of Zagreb County, Croatia. As of 2011 it had a population of 651.
