= Petrovina =

- Village
- Location within Croatia
- Coordinates: 45°40′59″N 15°34′59″E
- Country: Croatia

Area
  - Total: 7.3 km^{2} (2.8 sq mi)

Population (2021)
  - Total: 208
  - Density: 28/km^{2} (74/sq mi)
- Time zone: UTC+1 (CET)
  - Summer (DST): UTC+2 (CEST)

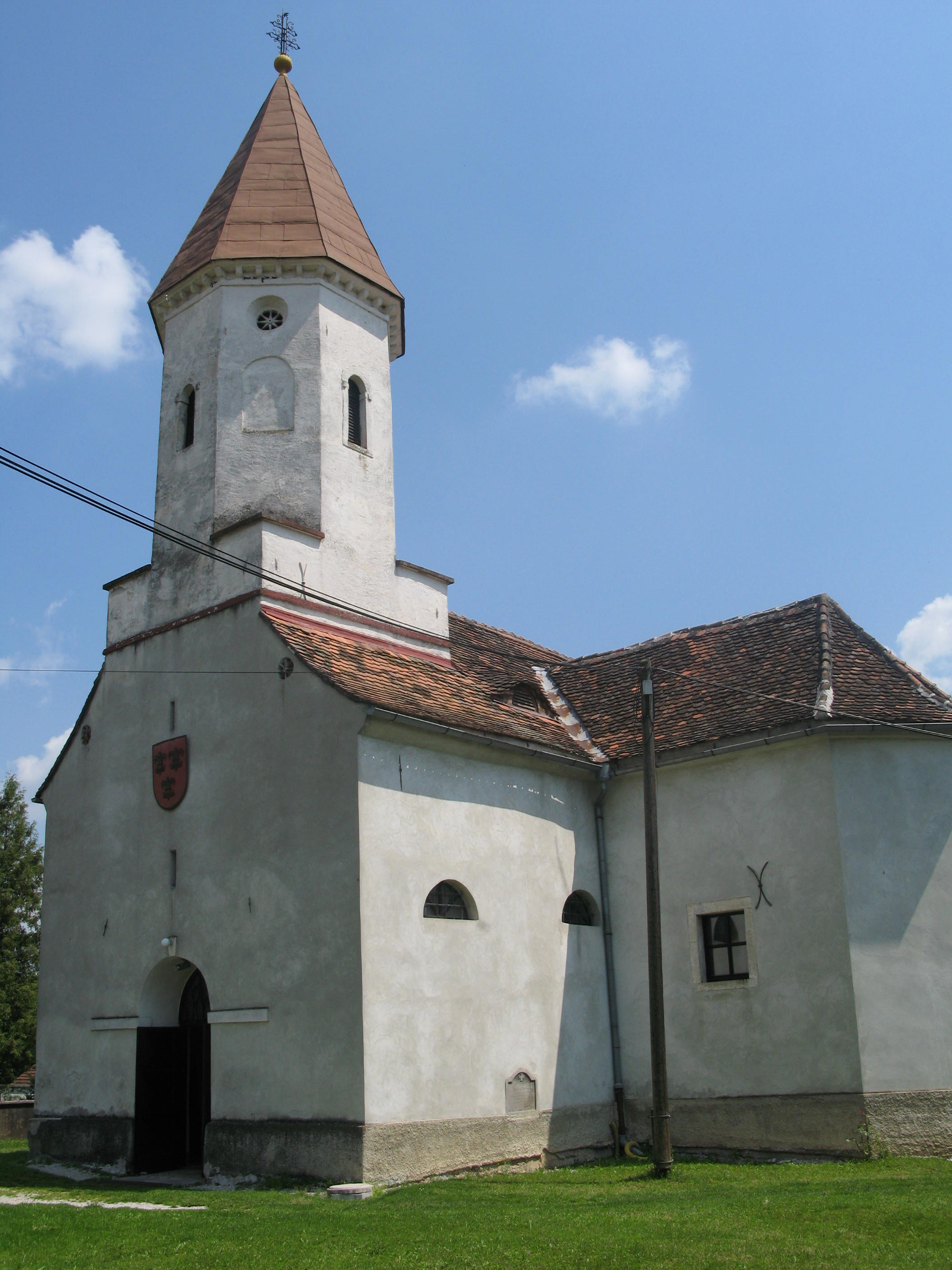
St. Peter's church in Petrovina

Petrovina is a village near Jastrebarsko, Croatia with a population of 246 (2011).
