= Draga Svetojanska =

- Settlement
- Location in Croatia
- Coordinates: 45°43′14″N 15°35′31″E
- Country: Croatia
- County: Zagreb
- Town: Jastrebarsko

Area
  - Total: 0.9 km^{2} (0.35 sq mi)

Population (2021)
  - Total: 121
  - Density: 130/km^{2} (350/sq mi)
- Time zone: UTC+1 (CET)
  - Summer (DST): UTC+2 (CEST)

Draga Svetojanska is a settlement in the Jastrebarsko administrative area of Zagreb County, Croatia. As of 2011 it had a population of 153.
