= Donja Zdenčina =

- Village
- Location within Croatia
- Coordinates: 45°40′02″N 15°45′47″E
- Country: Croatia
- County: Zagreb County
- Municipality: Klinča Sela

Area
  - Total: 29.1 km^{2} (11.2 sq mi)
- Elevation: 125 m (410 ft)

Population (2021)
  - Total: 934
  - Density: 32.1/km^{2} (83.1/sq mi)
- Time zone: UTC+1 (CET)
  - Summer (DST): UTC+2 (CEST)
- Postal code: 10450
- Area code: 01

Donja Zdenčina is a village in the Zagreb County, Croatia. The settlement is administered as a part of Klinča Sela municipality. At the 2011 national census, population of the settlement was 1,009.
