= Jastrebarsko =

- Town
- Grad Jastrebarsko; Town of Jastrebarsko
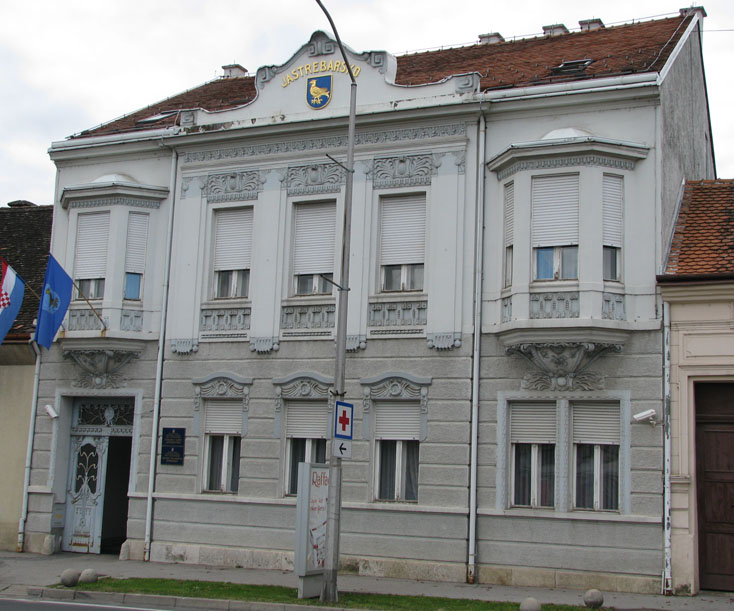
- Jastrebarsko Town Hall
- Nickname: Jaska
- Interactive map of Jastrebarsko
- Location of Jastrebarsko in Croatia
- Coordinates (Main square): 45°40′19″N 15°39′4″E
- Country: Croatia
- Region: Central Croatia (Prigorje)
- County: Zagreb County
- First mentioned: 1249
- Free royal town: 1257
- Incorporated: November 30, 1995
- Settlements: 59 settlements

Government
  - Mayor: Zvonimir Novosel (SDP)
  - Electoral district: 7th

Area
  - Town: 226.4 km^{2} (87.4 sq mi)
  - Urban: 19.6 km^{2} (7.6 sq mi)
  - Metro: 628.71 km^{2} (242.75 sq mi)
- Elevation: 154 m (505 ft)

Population (2021)
  - Town: 14,562
  - Density: 64.32/km^{2} (166.6/sq mi)
  - Urban: 5,312
  - Urban density: 271/km^{2} (702/sq mi)
- Time zone: UTC+1 (CET)
  - Summer (DST): UTC+2 (CEST)
- Postal code: 10450, 10453, 10454
- Area code: +385-1
- License plates: ZG
- Website: jastrebarsko.hr

Jastrebarsko (pronounced [jâstrebarsko]; Hungarian: Jaska), colloquially known as Jaska, is a town in Zagreb County, Croatia.

== History ==
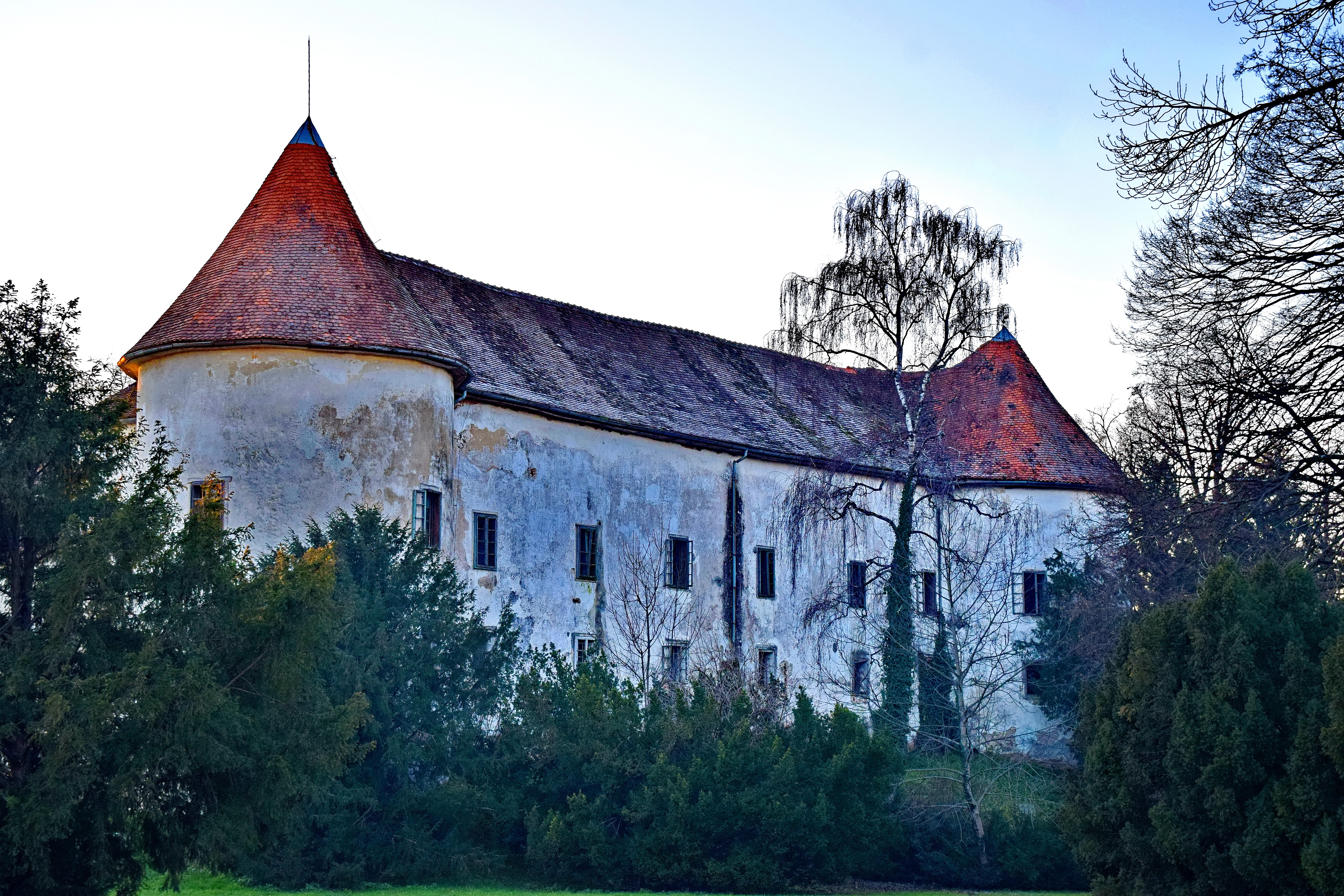
Erdödy Castle in Jastrebarsko, originally built by Croatian ban Matija Gereb.

=== Antiquity ===
In 1865, remnants of a Roman settlement were uncovered in Repišće, Klinča Sela, a village in Jastrebarsko metropolitan area. Further archeological investigation in the late 20th century classified them as a villa rustica and a necropolis consisting of six tumuli, both dating to the early Roman Empire period. The remnants are deemed to be the westernmost group of Noric-Pannonian tumuli and they make a very rare occasion of tombstones located directly on top of tumuli, which in the rest of Croatia is recorded only in Donji Čehi. The location of this archeological site on the fluvial terraces of the local Konjava stream^{[i]} is attributed to the peaceful state of the central Roman Empire, which in turn led to the formation of settlements in river valleys.

Sveta Marija pod Okićem (lit. 'Saint Mary under Okić') (locally nicknamed Grič), an archeological site located some 2.5 kilometers (1.6 mi) north of Repišće dating to the 4th century, shows a migration from easily accessible locations to steeper hills and creation of isolated walled refugia. This is attributed to the loss of stability in the Pannonian region and in the Empire overall. A necropolis belonging to Sveta Marija was found on the small valley of Popov Dol and small items were excavated there. Those were mostly bronze bracelets and glass chalices, items that Romans buried with their deceased. Two similar sites were found in the vicinity: Pavlovčani and Plešivica pass.

=== Modern settlement ===
The name Jastrebarsko is derived from jastreb, the Croatian word for 'hawk' or 'falcon'. This can be attributed to the practitioners of falconry (Croatian: jastrebar, pl. jastrebari), who were active in the area of southwest Zagreb County. A remnant of falconry can also be found in the Jastrebarsko coat of arms, which features a yellow goshawk on a blue blackground. The first mention of this name is found in a 1249 document of the Croatian ban Stjepan Gutkeled as "lands of Jastraburcza" (Latin: forenses de Jastraburcza). The town is therein described as a trade and judicial center. In 1257 Croato-Hungarian King Bela IV awarded Jastrebarsko the status of a "free royal trading center" (Croatian: slobodno kraljevsko trgovište) by the means of a golden bull. This status helped Jastrebarsko combat the interests of local feudal lords until the abolishment of the feudal system by ban Josip Jelačić in 1848.^{[ii]}

From 1518 to 1848 Jastrebarsko is heavily influenced by the Croato-Hungarian noble family Erdödy.

At the Slavonian Sabor of June 1579 in Zagreb, the dange of leaving the river crossings at Sveti Jakov, Luka and Rečica unguarded was noted, so for their fortification the Sabor allocated workers from the feudal estates of Ozalj, Jastrebarsko, Steničnjak, Završje, Slavetić, Turanj (Sveta Jana) and Kaptol Zagrebački.

The bans Petar II and Toma II Erdödy were known for their victories against the spreading Ottoman Empire. Toma, son of Petar, won the 1593 Battle of Sisak, a major and decisive battle in the Ottomans' centuries-long occupation of the Balkans. Later, in 1809 during the expansion of Napoleon's First French Empire, Jastrebarsko was for a short time incorporated in the Illyrian Provinces. This lasted until Summer 1813, when the French retreated from Croatia.

Jastrebarsko started to rapidly develop following the 1848 abolishment of feudalism. The Zagreb–Karlovac railway was built in 1865, providing the town with a major source of employment. The local elementary school, founded in the 17th century, was augmented by a number of other cultural, social and sports organization, including a library, the singing society "Javor", association of tamburica players, the volunteer fire brigade DVD "Drvoproizvod" (founded 1850), and a theater and others.

In the late 19th and early 20th centuries, Jastrebarsko was a district capital in the Zagreb County of the Kingdom of Croatia-Slavonia.

In the late 19th century, a Matica hrvatska branch opened in Jaska, with 25 members in 1891.

During World War II, in the summer of 1942, the Erdödy Castle in the town was the site of a concentration camp for Serb children operated by the authorities of the Independent State of Croatia.

== Geography ==
Jastrebarsko is located in the Prigorje region of Central Croatia, built around the Reka Creek (Croatian: Potok Reka; reka is Kajkavian dialect word for river). On the west, Jastrebarsko is bordered by the Žumberak Mountain (Croatian: Žumberačka gora), a mountain range spreading through southeast Slovenia and southwest Prigorje, specifically Žumberak municipality and City of Samobor. The average altitude of the city is 154 metres (505 ft) and the highest elevation in the Jastrebarsko metropolitan area is recorded on the 1,181-metre (3,875 ft) Sveta Gera summit of the Žumberak mountain, also claimed by Slovenia.

== Transport ==
Jastrebarsko lies on both Zagreb–Split (Adriatic-Ionian highway) and Zagreb-Rijeka (Corridor Vb) rail and road corridors. There is a highway exit near Jastrebarsko on the A1 highway, located between the Lučko interchange near Zagreb and the Karlovac interchange. This 37-kilometer (23 mi) stretch is the oldest modern highway in Croatia, dating back to 1970. The Zagreb–Karlovac–Rijeka magistral railroad M202, part of the Pan-European corridor Vb, passes through Jastrebarsko. Jastrebarsko is served by a high-speed tilting train running between Zagreb and Rijeka and commuter trains operating between the town and Zagreb. The city administration has called for a traffic study in 2007 by Ivan Dadić, a Croatian traffic expert, to solve the transport problems riddling Jastrebarsko's roads. Preliminary opinion by Dadić called for construction of four additional interchanges on the Zagreb–Karlovac stretch that would stop Jastrebarsko from being the bottleneck exit for all commuters living on the A1 corridor.

== Climate ==
The climate of Jastrebarsko is classified as maritime temperate with a slightly drier winter (Cfwbx in Köppen climate classification system). The city experiences four separate seasons. Winters are mild and summers are cool and the dry season spans through the winter and early spring. The average January low is around −6 °C (21 °F), while the July high tends to be near 22 °C (72 °F). The average yearly temperature is 10 °C (50 °F). Record temperatures have been encountered in July 1983 (35.5 °C or 95.9 °F) and January 1985 (−25.5 °C or −13.9 °F). There are scientifically documented claims that the global warming affects the climate in Jastrebarsko by increasing average yearly temperature by 1.2 °C (2.1 °F).

Between 1981 and 2014, the highest temperature recorded at the local weather station was 39.0 °C (102.2 °F), on 24 August 2012. The coldest temperature was −25.5 °C (−13.9 °F), on 12 January 1985.

Climate data for Jastrebarsko
Month	Jan	Feb	Mar	Apr	May	Jun	Jul	Aug	Sep	Oct	Nov	Dec	Year
Record high °C (°F)	19.0 (66.2)	21.0 (69.8)	26.0 (78.8)	27.0 (80.6)	30.0 (86.0)	32.5 (90.5)	35.5 (95.9)	34.5 (94.1)	33.5 (92.3)	29.5 (85.1)	21.5 (70.7)	22.5 (72.5)	35.5 (95.9)
Mean daily maximum °C (°F)	3.7 (38.7)	5.9 (42.6)	8.5 (47.3)	12.4 (54.3)	18.1 (64.6)	20.1 (68.2)	21.8 (71.2)	20.3 (68.5)	18.5 (65.3)	12.0 (53.6)	6.6 (43.9)	3.9 (39.0)	10.8 (51.4)
Daily mean °C (°F)	−0.4 (31.3)	1.4 (34.5)	5.6 (42.1)	9.8 (49.6)	14.9 (58.8)	17.8 (64.0)	19.8 (67.6)	18.9 (66.0)	15.1 (59.2)	9.9 (49.8)	4.1 (39.4)	0.9 (33.6)	9.8 (49.6)
Mean daily minimum °C (°F)	−6.1 (21.0)	−4.2 (24.4)	1.4 (34.5)	7.7 (45.9)	12.1 (53.8)	16.6 (61.9)	18.0 (64.4)	16.3 (61.3)	12.6 (54.7)	6.5 (43.7)	0.8 (33.4)	−2.2 (28.0)	8.8 (47.8)
Record low °C (°F)	−25.5 (−13.9)	−24.0 (−11.2)	−18.0 (−0.4)	−4.5 (23.9)	−2.0 (28.4)	3.5 (38.3)	5.5 (41.9)	3.0 (37.4)	−2.0 (28.4)	−5.8 (21.6)	−14.5 (5.9)	−19.0 (−2.2)	−25.5 (−13.9)
Average precipitation mm (inches)	54.1 (2.13)	60.1 (2.37)	69.1 (2.72)	68.2 (2.69)	80.0 (3.15)	98.3 (3.87)	82.2 (3.24)	88.6 (3.49)	95.3 (3.75)	81.7 (3.22)	88.5 (3.48)	64.7 (2.55)	928.2 (36.54)

== Demographics ==
In the 2011 census, the city of Jastrebarsko has a total population of 15,866. 5,493 of whom live in the settlement of Jastrebarsko itself (naselje). The settlement (naselje) of Jastrebarsko encompasses nearly a third of the total population of the town, but less than a tenth of the total area. The records from the earlier censuses show a decrease in total population from a high of 17,895 in 1991, although the population of the seat settlement has been continuously increasing since at least 1981.

Jastrebarsko metropolitan area includes the City of Jastrebarsko and three adjacent municipalities: Klinča Sela, Krašić and Žumberak. The area is fairly large at 628 square kilometers (242 sq mi), but has a low population density and encompasses only 29,697 people.

Town of Jastrebarsko: Population trends 1857–2021
v

population	12134	13592	14377	15793	15654	15956	15261	16284	16763	18190	18184	18056	17441	17895	16689	15866	14562
	1857	1869	1880	1890	1900	1910	1921	1931	1948	1953	1961	1971	1981	1991	2001	2011	2021

Sources: Croatian Bureau of Statistics publications

=== Settlements ===
The settlements in the city administrative area are:

- Belčići, population 91
- Brebrovac, population 74
- Brezari, population 66
- Breznik Plešivički, population 123
- Bukovac Svetojanski, population 85
- Celine, population 68
- Crna Mlaka, population 30
- Cvetković, population 616
- Čabdin, population 139
- Čeglje, population 373
- Črnilovec, population 123
- Dolanjski Jarak, population 32
- Domagović, population 541
- Donja Reka, population 349
- Donji Desinec, population 799
- Draga Svetojanska, population 153
- Dragovanščak, population 101
- Goljak, population 59
- Gorica Svetojanska, population 116
- Gornja Kupčina, population 148
- Gornja Reka, population 359
- Gornji Desinec, population 651
- Grabarak, population 0
- Gračac Slavetićki, population 5
- Guci Draganički, population 302
- Hrastje Plešivičko, population 182
- Hrašća, population 86
- Ivančići, population 198
- Izimje, population 221
- Jastrebarsko, population 5,493
- Jurjevčani, population 99
- Kupeć Dol, population 97
- Lanišće, population 0
- Lokošin Dol, population 95
- Malunje, population 211
- Miladini, population 58
- Novaki Petrovinski, population 292
- Orešje Okićko, population 16
- Paljugi, population 10
- Pavlovčani, population 290
- Pesak, population 13
- Petrovina, population 246
- Plešivica, population 292
- Prhoć, population 235
- Prilipje, population 225
- Prodin Dol, population 97
- Rastoki, population 109
- Redovje, population 29
- Slavetić, population 84
- Srednjak, population 45
- Stankovo, population 370
- Špigelski Breg, population 0
- Tihočaj, population 3
- Toplice, population 96
- Vlaškovec, population 120
- Volavje, population 398
- Vranov Dol, population 137
- Vukšin Šipak, population 310
- Zdihovo, population 306

== Sports ==
The local chapter of the HPS is HPD "Plješivica", which had 47 members in 1936 under the Josip Brkić presidency. At the time, it also had a ski section, a music section and a photography section. Membership rose to 53 in 1937. Membership rose to 61 in 1938.

== Notable inhabitants ==
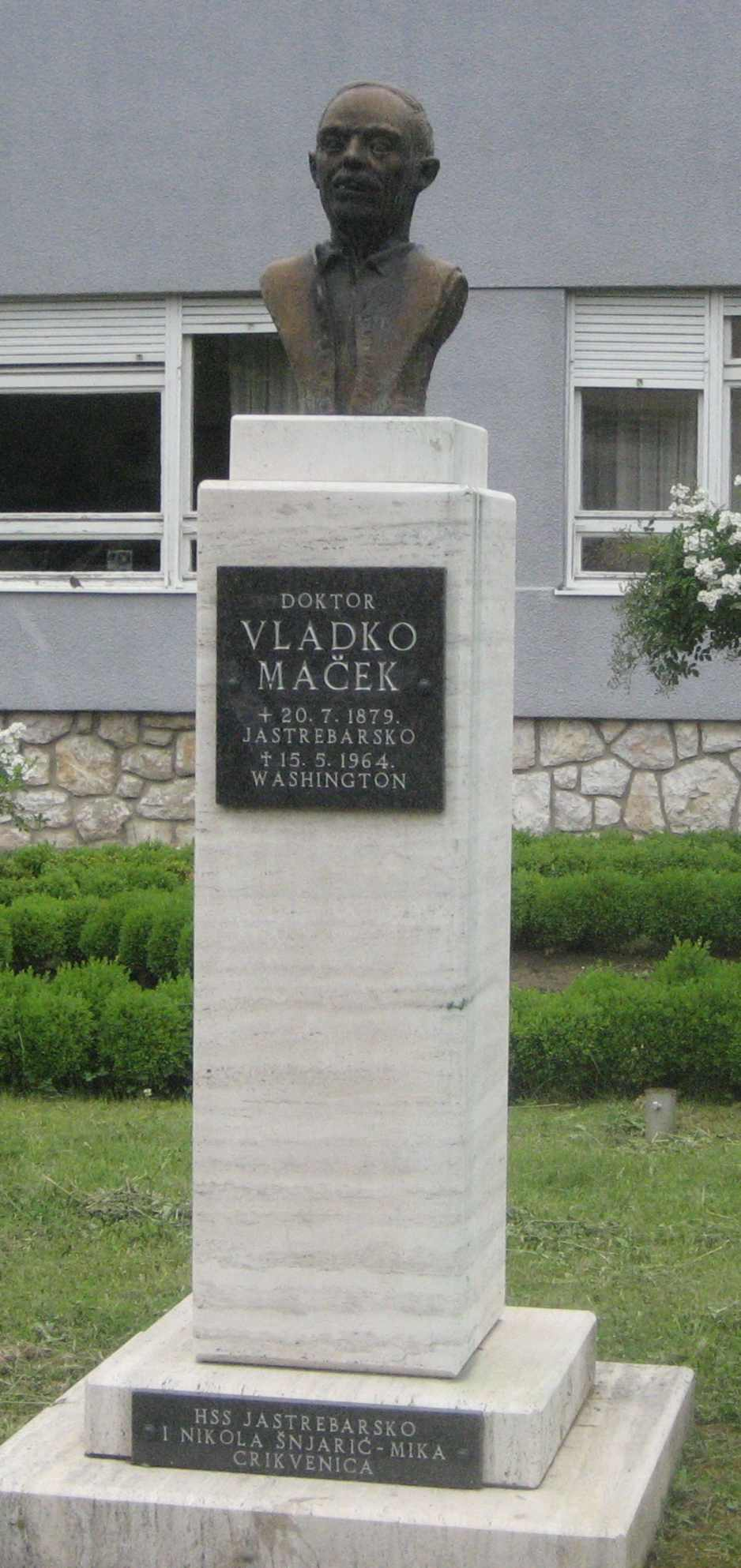
Vladko Maček memorial in Jastrebarsko

Jastrebarsko was home to two important Croatian Roman Catholic cardinals: Aloysius Stepinac (1898–1960) and Franjo Kuharić (1919–2002). Aloysius Stepinac (Croatian: Alojzije Stepinac) was born in Krašić municipality in Jastrebarsko metropolitan area and made Archbishop of Zagreb in 1937 and later cardinal in 1952. In 1946, Stepinac was sentenced by a Yugoslav court to 16 years in prison for alleged collaborating with the Nazis. He was released five years later and died in home confinement. He was buried in the Zagreb Cathedral and Franjo Šeper succeeded him as the new Archbishop of Zagreb. The other cardinal was Franjo Kuharić, also from Krašić. He became a priest in 1945 and succeeded Šeper (then already a cardinal) as the Archbishop of Zagreb in 1970. In 1983 pope John Paul II chose him as a cardinal. Kuharić remained on that duty until his retirement in 1997.

Two influential Croatian politicians are known to have lived in Jastrebarsko. Vladko Maček, a Croatian politician from the first half of the 20th century also hails from Jastrebarsko. Born in a nearby village, Kupinec, Maček led the Croatian Peasant Party fighting for the independence of Croatia since the assassination of Stjepan Radić until World War II and the establishment of the Independent State of Croatia by the Axis powers which defeated the Kingdom of Yugoslavia in 1941. Ante Starčević, termed "Father of the Croatian homeland" (Croatian: Otac domovine), fought for the independence and the democratical re-establishment of the medieval Kingdom of Croatia, opposing the Hungarian sympathizer and ban of Croatia Khuen-Héderváry. He lived in Jastrebarsko for seven years while working in a law practice. Ljubomir Micić, born in Jastrebarsko in 1895, was a Serbian poet, writer, critic, editor and actor.

Boris Klemenić was mayor of the town for eight years.

== Twin town ==
- Érd, Hungary
