= Klinča Sela =

- Municipality
- Municipality of Klinča Sela
- Interactive map of Klinča Sela
- Location of Klinča Sela in Croatia
- Coordinates: 45°40′48″N 15°45′0″E
- Country: Croatia
- County: Zagreb County

Area
  - Municipality: 77.0 km^{2} (29.7 sq mi)
  - Urban: 5.6 km^{2} (2.2 sq mi)

Population (2021)
  - Municipality: 5,044
  - Density: 65.5/km^{2} (170/sq mi)
  - Urban: 1,809
  - Urban density: 320/km^{2} (840/sq mi)
- Time zone: UTC+1 (Central European Time)
- Vehicle registration: ZG
- Website: klinca-sela.hr

Klinča Sela is a municipality in Zagreb County, Croatia.

In the 2011 census, there were a total of 5,231 inhabitants, in the following settlements:

- Beter, population 207
- Donja Purgarija, population 123
- Donja Zdenčina, population 1,009
- Goli Vrh, population 278
- Gonjeva, population 49
- Gornja Purgarija, population 82
- Gornja Zdenčina, population 161
- Klinča Sela, population 1,726
- Kozlikovo, population 127
- Kupinec, population 881
- Novo Selo Okićko, population 110
- Poljanica Okićka, population 4
- Repišće, population 359
- Tržić, population 115
