= Ivančići, Croatia =

Coordinates: 45°43′N 15°36′E

- Settlement
- Location within Croatia
- Country: Croatia
- County: Zagreb
- Town: Jastrebarsko

Population (2011)
  - Total: 198
- Time zone: UTC+1 (CET)
  - Summer (DST): UTC+2 (CEST)

Ivančići, Croatia is a settlement in the Jastrebarsko administrative area of Zagreb County, Croatia. As of 2011 it had a population of 198 people.
