= Goljak, Croatia =

Settlement in Zagreb County, Croatia

Goljak
- Settlement
- Interactive map of Goljak
- Location of Goljak in Croatia
- Coordinates: 45°37′N 15°36′E
- Country: Croatia
- County: Zagreb County
- City: Jastrebarsko

Area
  - Total: 2.4 km^{2} (0.93 sq mi)

Population (2021)
  - Total: 46
  - Density: 19/km^{2} (50/sq mi)
- Time zone: UTC+1 (CET)
  - Summer (DST): UTC+2 (CEST)
- Postal code: 10450 Jastrebarsko
- Area code: +385 (0)1

Goljak is a settlement in the City of Jastrebarsko in Croatia. In 2021, its population was 46.

== Demographics ==
Goljak: Population trends 1857–2021
v

population	158	191	214	244	281	283	284	346	336	305	265	243	172	141	84	59	46
	1857	1869	1880	1890	1900	1910	1921	1931	1948	1953	1961	1971	1981	1991	2001	2011	2021

Sources: Croatian Bureau of Statistics publications
