= Donji Čehi =

- Village
- Location within Croatia
- Coordinates: 45°44′23″N 15°57′38″E
- Country: Croatia
- County: City of Zagreb

Area
  - Total: 0.66 sq mi (1.7 km^{2})
- Elevation: 387 ft (118 m)

Population (2021)
  - Total: 243
  - Density: 370/sq mi (140/km^{2})
- Time zone: UTC+1 (CET)
  - Summer (DST): UTC+2 (CEST)

Donji Čehi is a village in Croatia. It is formally a settlement (naselje) of Zagreb, the capital of Croatia.

== Demographics ==
According to the 2021 census, its population was 243. According to the 2011 census, it had 232 inhabitants.
