= Volujak, Kreševo =

Volujak Волујак
- Village
- Location within Bosnia and Herzegovina
- Coordinates: 43.8797068°N 18.0893137°E
- Country: Bosnia and Herzegovina
- Entity: Federation of Bosnia and Herzegovina
- Canton: Central Bosnia
- Municipality: Kreševo

Area
  - Total: 1.19 sq mi (3.07 km^{2})

Population (2013)
  - Total: 208
  - Density: 175/sq mi (67.8/km^{2})
- Time zone: UTC+1 (CET)
  - Summer (DST): UTC+2 (CEST)

Volujak is a village in the municipality of Kreševo, Bosnia and Herzegovina.

== Demographics ==
According to the 2013 census, its population was 99.

Ethnicity in 2013
Ethnicity	Number	Percentage
Croats	61	61.6%
Bosniaks	37	37.4%
Serbs	0	0.0%
other/undeclared	1	1.0%
Total	99	100%
