= Repišće =

- Location within Croatia
- Coordinates: 45°43′20″N 15°42′33″E
- Country: Croatia
- County: Zagreb County
- Municipality: Klinča Sela

Area
  - Total: 2.4 km^{2} (0.93 sq mi)

Population (2021)
  - Total: 351
  - Density: 150/km^{2} (380/sq mi)
- Time zone: UTC+1 (CET)
  - Summer (DST): UTC+2 (CEST)

Repišće is a naselje (settlement) in the municipality of Klinča Sela, Zagreb County, Croatia.

== Population ==
According to the 2001 census, it has 354 inhabitants living in an area of 1.96 square kilometers (0.76 sq mi).
