= Plešivica, Sežana =

Plešivica
- Location in Slovenia
- Coordinates: 45°41′40.81″N 13°54′46.06″E
- Country: Slovenia
- Traditional region: Littoral
- Statistical region: Coastal–Karst
- Municipality: Sežana

Area
  - Total: 0.55 km^{2} (0.21 sq mi)
- Elevation: 400.9 m (1,315 ft)

Population (2002)
  - Total: 51

Plešivica (pronounced [plɛˈʃiːʋitsa]; Italian: Plessiva) is a small village west of Povir in the Municipality of Sežana in the Littoral region of Slovenia.

== Name ==
The name Plješivica is common for mountains and hills with meadows on top, derived from the adjective plešiv 'bare, treeless'. The toponym can be either a proper noun or an appellative. In addition to other places and features named Plešivica, related Slavic geographical names include Pleševica, Plišivica, Plješevica, Plješivica, and Pljišivica.
