= Zdihovo, Zagreb County =

- Settlement
- Location within Croatia
- Coordinates: 45.6887°N 15.6556°E
- Country: Croatia
- County: Zagreb
- Town: Jastrebarsko

Population (2011)
  - Total: 306
- Time zone: UTC+1 (CET)
  - Summer (DST): UTC+2 (CEST)

Zdihovo, Zagreb County is a settlement in the Jastrebarsko administrative area of Zagreb County, Croatia. As of 2011 it had a population of 306 people.
