= Zelovo, Sinj =

Settlement in Split-Dalmatia County, Croatia

Zelovo
- Settlement
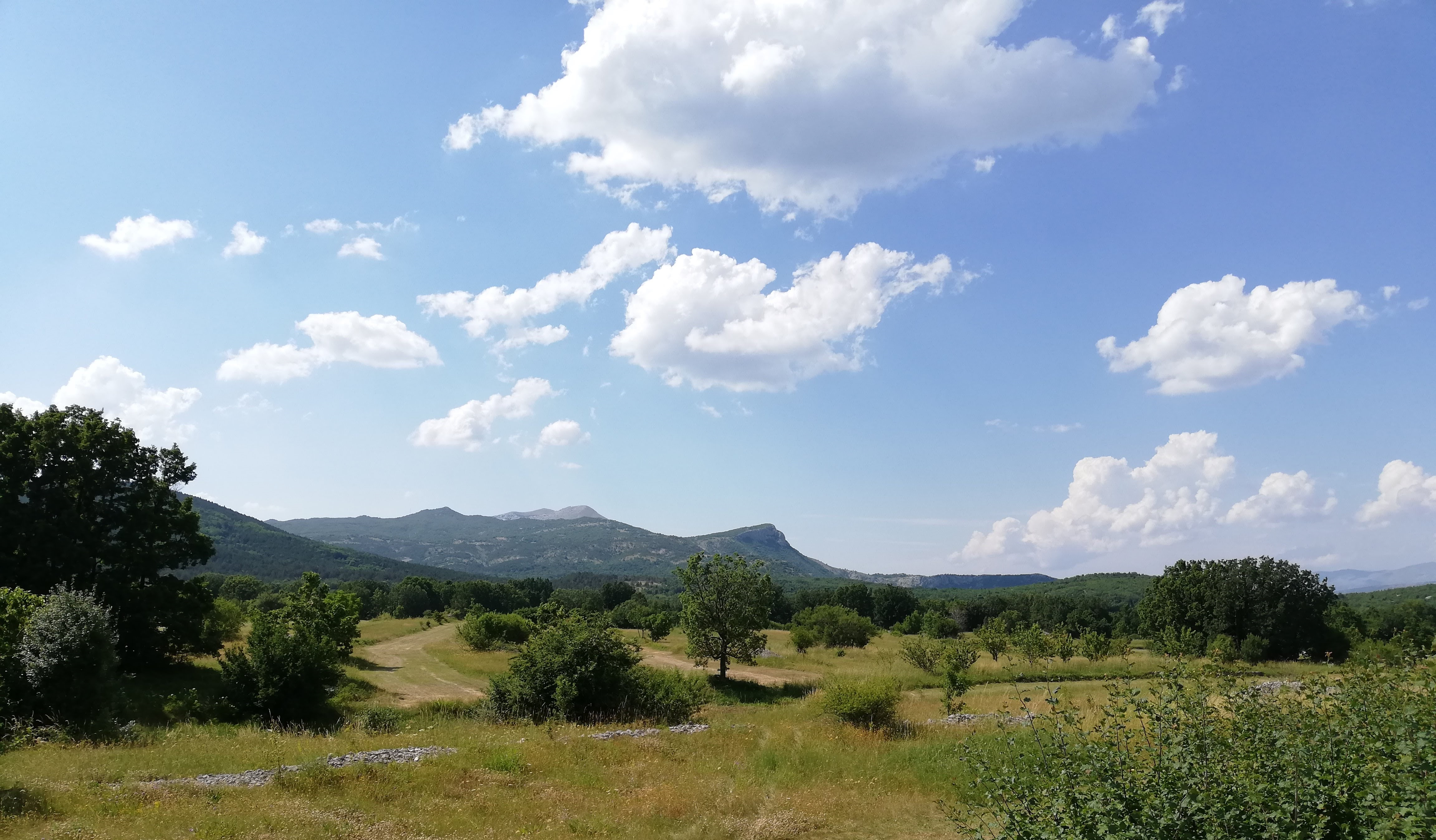
- Interactive map of Zelovo
- Location of Zelovo in Croatia
- Coordinates: 43°45′07″N 16°33′04″E
- Country: Croatia
- County: Split-Dalmatia
- City: Sinj

Area
  - Total: 11.0 km^{2} (4.2 sq mi)

Population (2021)
  - Total: 122
  - Density: 11.1/km^{2} (28.7/sq mi)
- Time zone: UTC+1 (CET)
  - Summer (DST): UTC+2 (CEST)
- Postal code: 21233 Hrvace
- Area code: +385 (0)21
- Vehicle registration: ST

Zelovo is a village within the area of the City of Sinj in Croatia. In 2021, its population was 122. It is located at the southern slope of the Svilaja mountain, about 14 km from the town of Sinj and 7 km from the village of Hrvace, which is also the next largest settlement near Zelovo.

The surroundings of the village include the mountains of Plišivica, Gradina and Orlove Stine (part of Svilaja mountain with a steep face), which are known for the occasional settlement of griffon vultures during their migration to the island of Cres and towards the Julian Alps in Slovenia.

The village also houses the St. Vitus Church, patron saint of the village, and the village festival takes place on St. Vitus Day, 15 June.

The village is known for its autochthonous Zelovo tobacco pipe made of clay. These clay pipes are made only in Zelovo and nowhere else in Croatia. In addition to pipes, the inhabitants produced also cigarette holders, wooden toys, furniture, wood carving decoration objects and musical instruments ("diple"-flutes, flutes and stringed instruments). Almost every household in Zelovo was a production site for various craft items. There are few rural villages in Croatia where craftsmanship was so developed and promoted.

The most famous product, however, is the famous Zelovo tobacco pipe. The beginnings of pipe production were recorded in the first half of the 18th century, when families with surnames Delaš, Domazet and Jukić moved to Zelovo, where the pipes were made.

Other surnames are Barać, Gabrić, Jelavić, Jelčić, Marović and Šako.

== Demographics ==
Zelovo: Population trends 1857–2021
v

population	313		239	329	422	381	451	423	608	439	383	324	312	266	181	181	122
	1857	1869	1880	1890	1900	1910	1921	1931	1948	1953	1961	1971	1981	1991	2001	2011	2021

Sources: Croatian Bureau of Statistics publications

== Notable people ==
- Joško Jelčić (football player / TV expert)
- Mario Delaš (basketball player)
- Ante Delaš (basketball player)
- Matko Jelavić (singer)
