= Krasno, Croatia =

Krasno
- Village
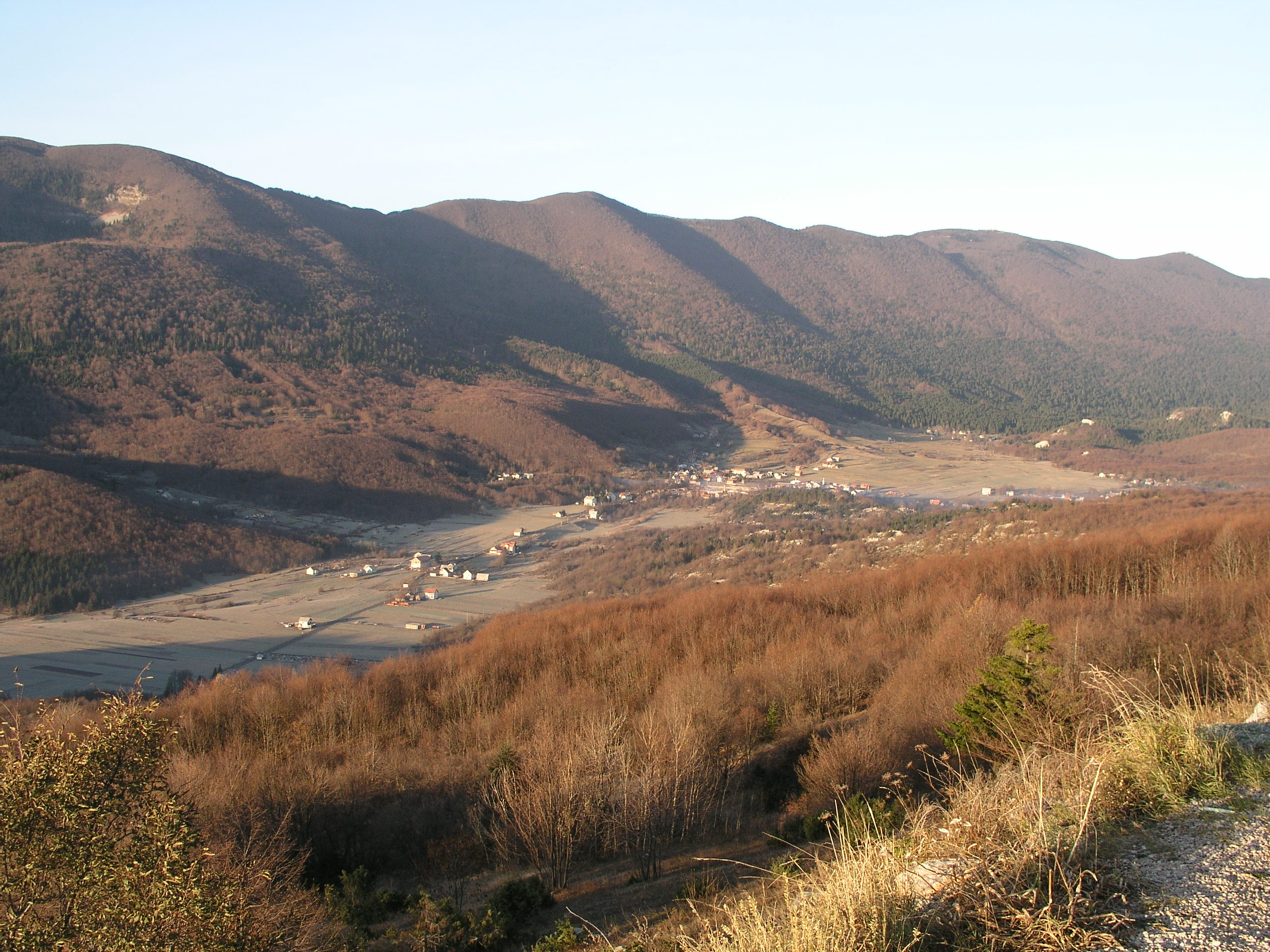
- Krasno in Krasnarsko polje

- Location within Croatia
- Coordinates: 44.823°N 15.051°E
- Country: Croatia
- County: Primorje-Gorski Kotar County
- City: Mrkopalj

Area
  - Total: 14.3 km^{2} (5.5 sq mi)

Population (2021)
  - Total: 262
  - Density: 18.3/km^{2} (47.5/sq mi)
- Time zone: UTC+1 (CET)
  - Summer (DST): UTC+2 (CEST)
- Postal code: 51326
- Area code: +385 051

Krasno is a village in Croatia, in the Mrkopalj municipality, in Primorje-Gorski Kotar County.

== Demographics ==
Village of Krasno: Population trends 1857–2021
v

population	874	1165	1236	1359	1459	1483	1390	1404	1287	1194	1086	873	754	674	535	476	385
	1857	1869	1880	1890	1900	1910	1921	1931	1948	1953	1961	1971	1981	1991	2001	2011	2021

Note:Simply "Krasno" until 1931, then "Krasno Polje", and recently "Krasno" again. Sources: Croatian Bureau of Statistics publications

== Gallery ==
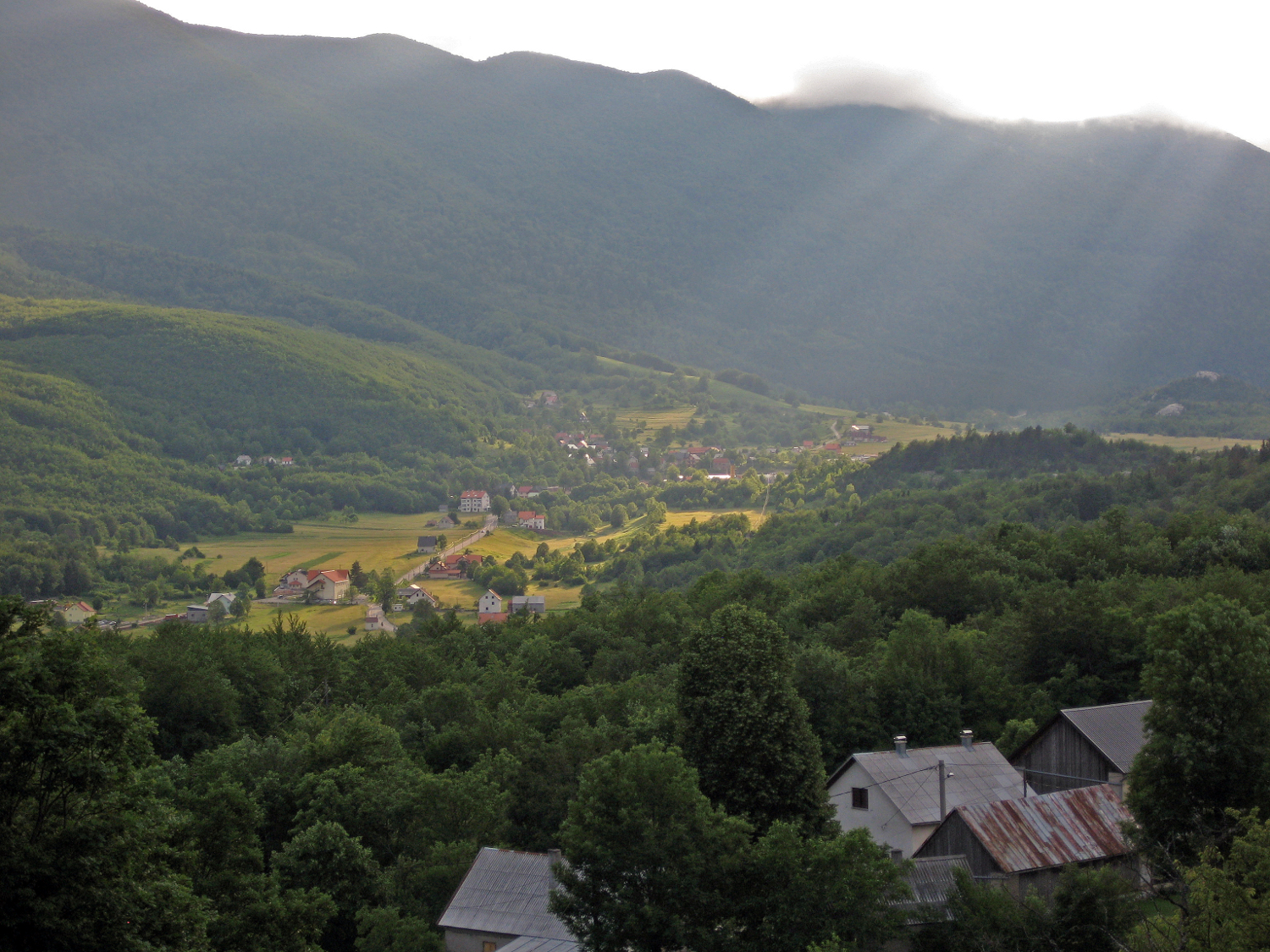
Town

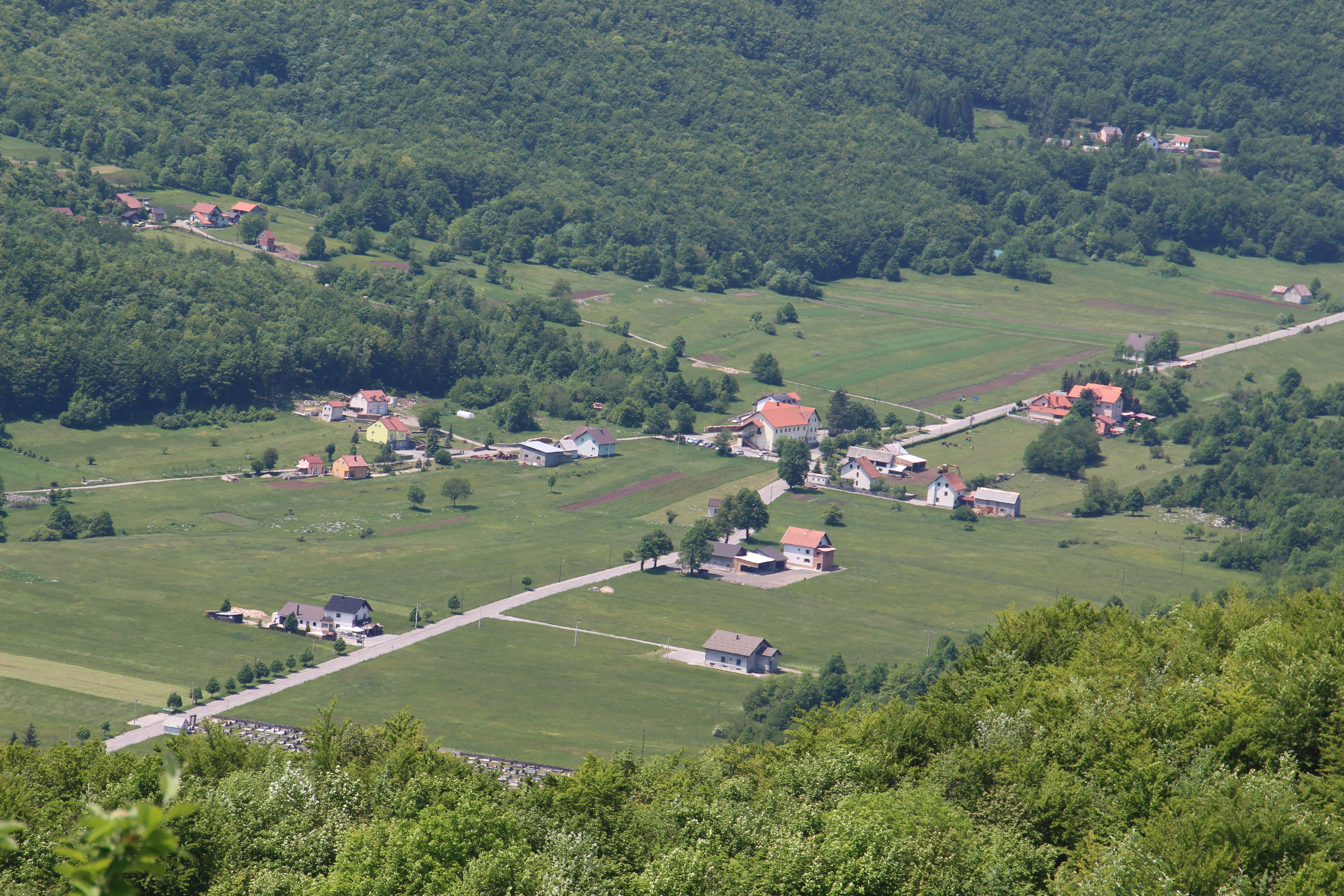
Hamlet

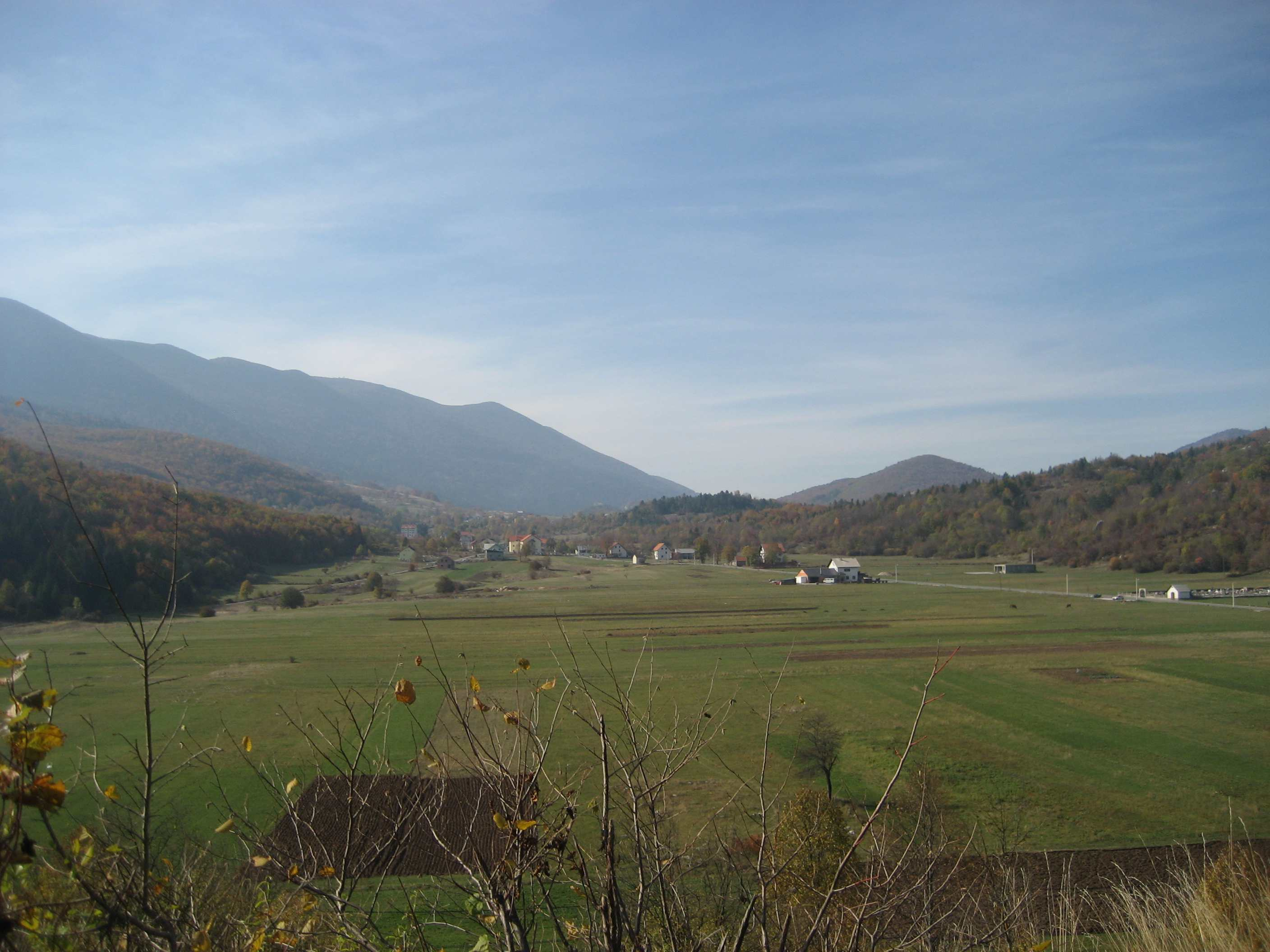
Krasnarsko polje

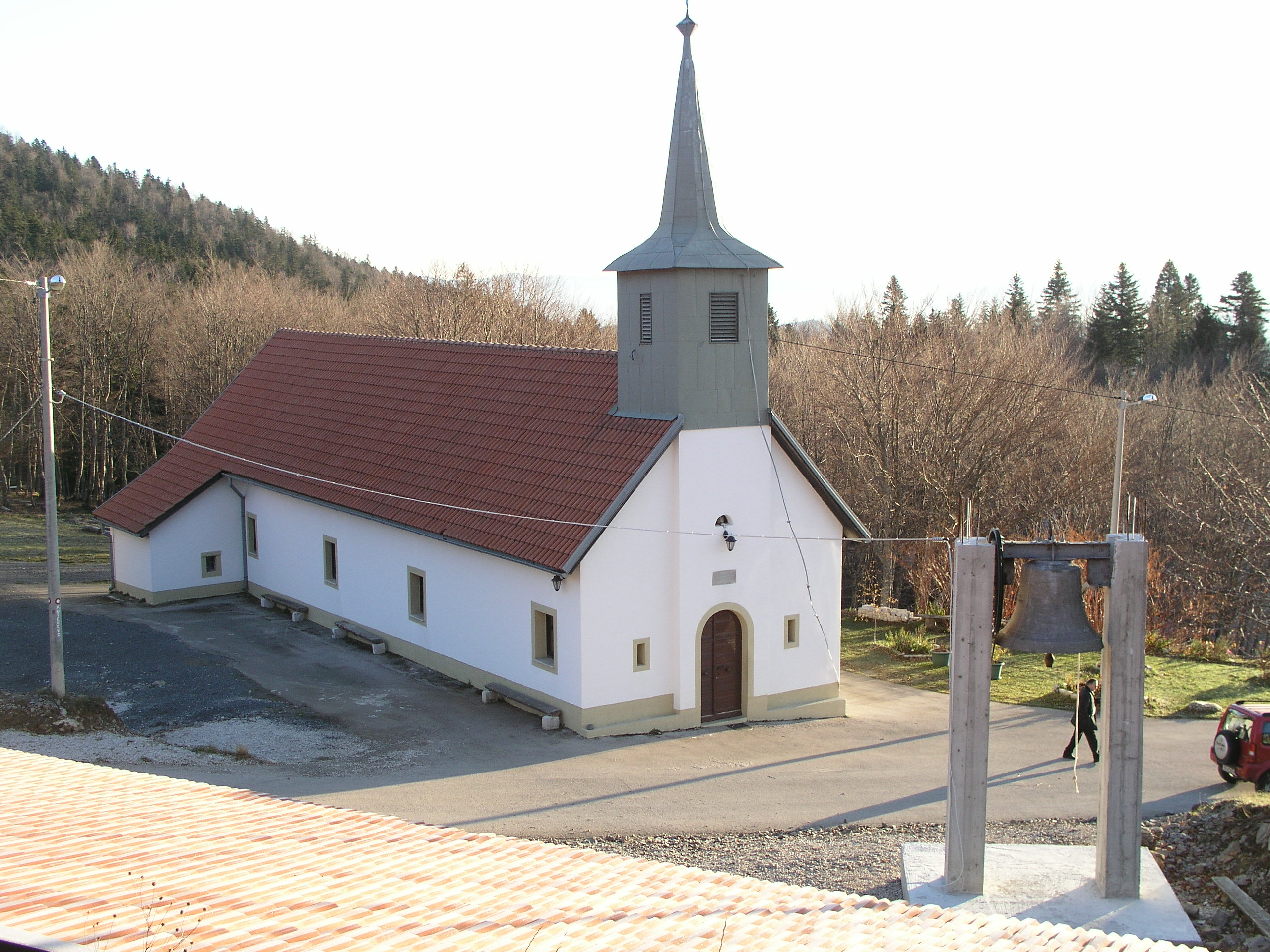
Majke Božje church

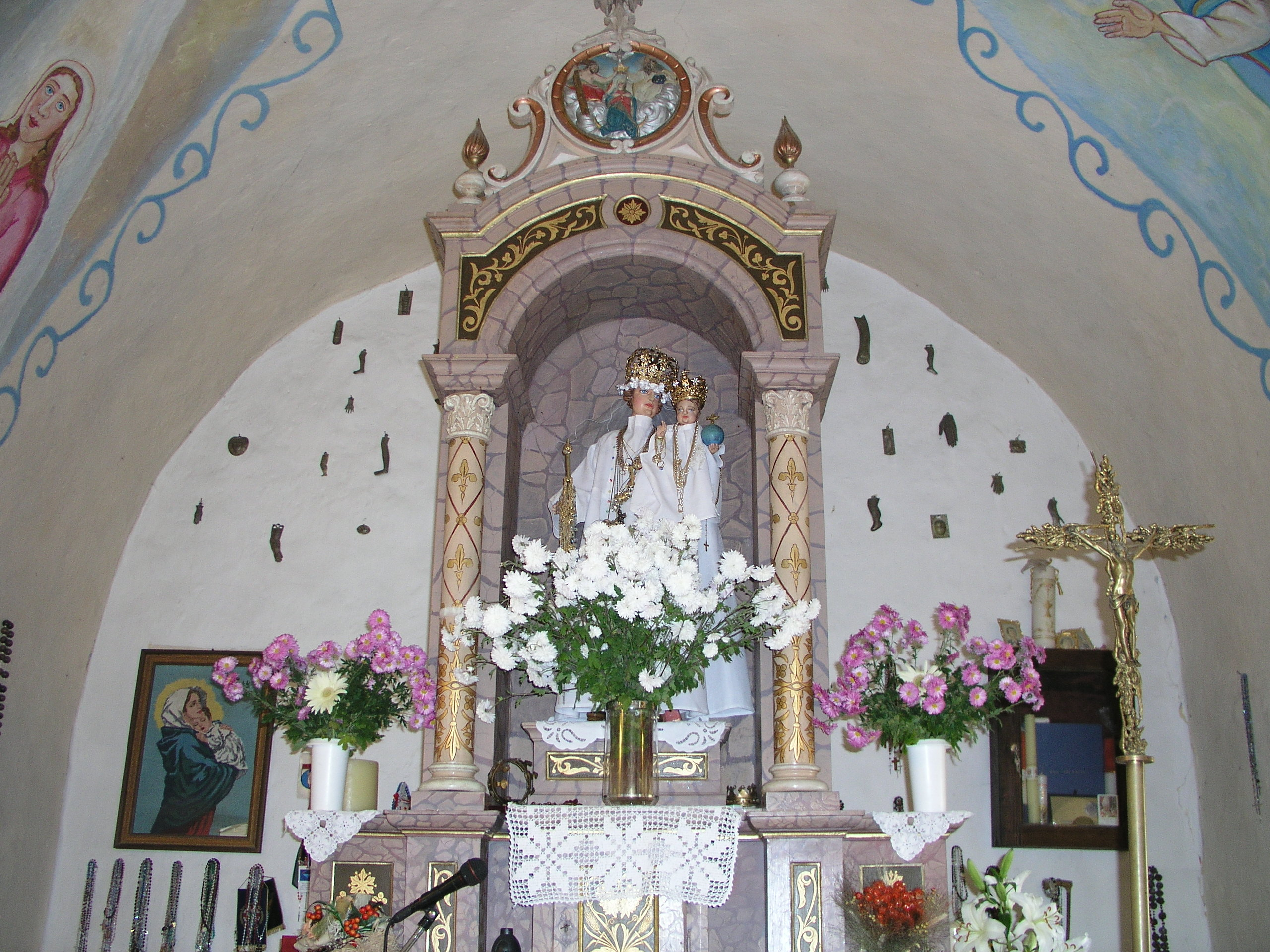
Majke Božje altar
