= Vrpolje, Split-Dalmatia County =

Settlement in Split-Dalmatia County, Croatia

Vrpolje
- Settlement
- Interactive map of Vrpolje
- Location within Croatia
- Coordinates: 43°36′14″N 16°49′48″E
- Country: Croatia
- County: Split-Dalmatia
- City: Trilj

Area
  - Total: 4.6 km^{2} (1.8 sq mi)

Population (2021)
  - Total: 68
  - Density: 15/km^{2} (38/sq mi)
- Time zone: UTC+1 (CET)
  - Summer (DST): UTC+2 (CEST)
- Postal code: 21240 Trilj
- Area code: +385 (0)21

Vrpolje is a settlement in the City of Trilj in Croatia. In 2021, its population was 68.

== Demographics ==
Vrpolje: Population trends 1857–2021
v

population	225	403	178	232	236	257	573	404	248	283	318	270	356	325	202	93	68
	1857	1869	1880	1890	1900	1910	1921	1931	1948	1953	1961	1971	1981	1991	2001	2011	2021

Sources: Croatian Bureau of Statistics publications

== Landmarks ==
The Vrpolje region is dotted with sixteen traditional water sources, encompassing ponds, wells, and cisterns, all designated as culturally significant heritage architecture. Historically crucial for supplying year-round water to both the local population and their livestock, these sites held a parallel importance as gathering points for sharing news and gossip, or for courtship. A specific cluster of three representative reservoirs exists on Jelinak Hill within Vrpolje, including the culturally protected "Lokva" pool near the Church of Jesus' Holy Heart.

Built in 1927, the cut-stone church is notable for its pentagonal apse and a bell tower built into its facade.
