= Donji Muć =

Settlement in Split-Dalmatia County, Croatia

- Settlement
- Interactive map of Donji Muć
- Location of Donji Muć in Croatia
- Coordinates: 43°43′34″N 16°30′00″E
- Country: Croatia
- County: Split-Dalmatia
- Municipality: Muć

Area
  - Total: 27.7 km^{2} (10.7 sq mi)

Population (2021)
  - Total: 541
  - Density: 19.5/km^{2} (50.6/sq mi)
- Time zone: UTC+1 (CET)
  - Summer (DST): UTC+2 (CEST)
- Postal code: 21203 Donji Muć
- Area code: +385 (0)21

Donji Muć is a settlement in the Municipality of Muć in Croatia. In 2021, its population was 541.

== Demographics ==
Donji Muć: Population trends 1857–2021
v

population	793	638	768	858	918	965	965	1072	914	919	945	817	737	717	570	590	541
	1857	1869	1880	1890	1900	1910	1921	1931	1948	1953	1961	1971	1981	1991	2001	2011	2021

Sources: Croatian Bureau of Statistics publications
