= Tribunj =

- Village / Municipality
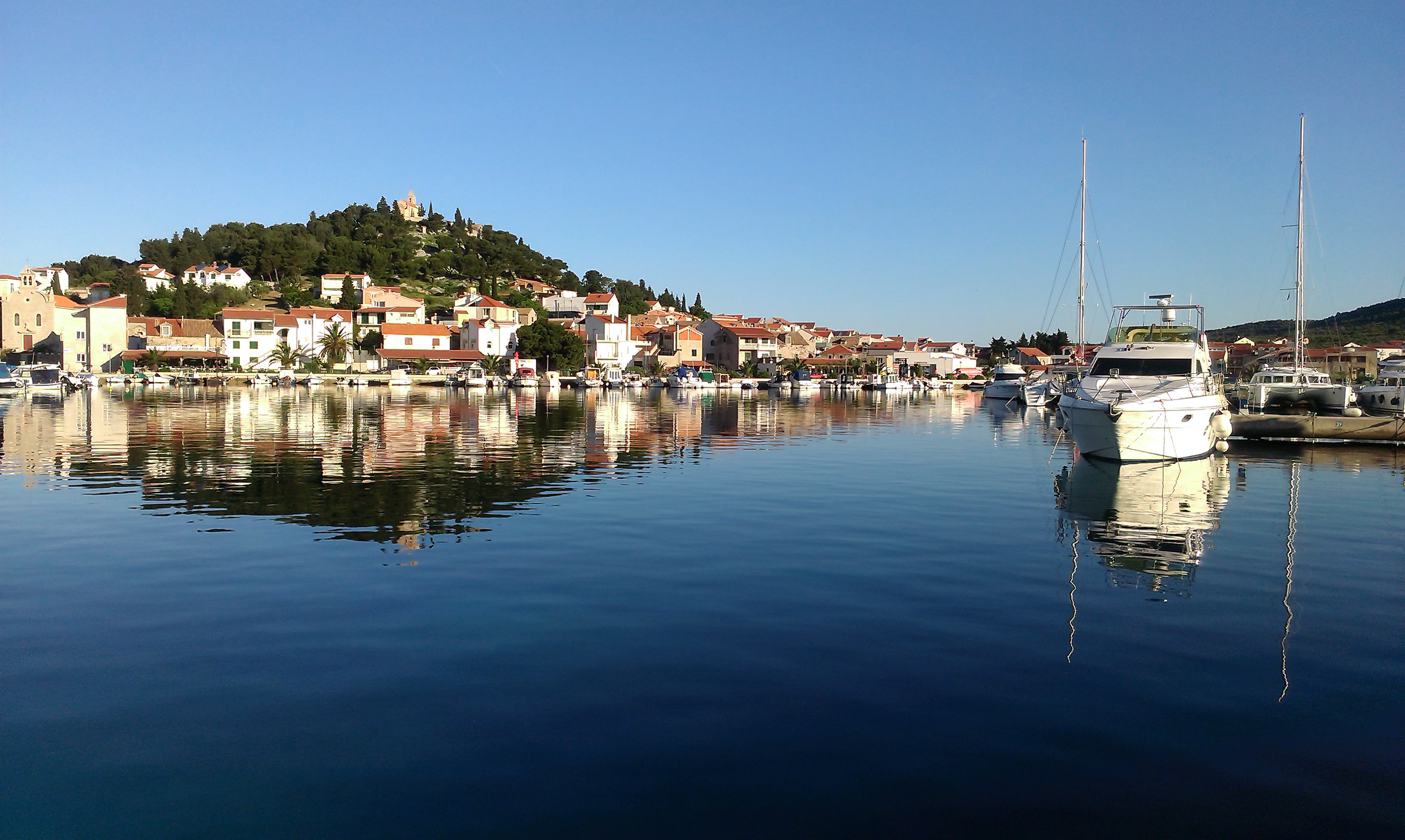
- Interactive map of Tribunj
- Location of Tribunj in Croatia
- Coordinates: 43°45′26″N 15°44′54″E
- Country: Croatia
- Region: Dalmatia
- County: Šibenik-Knin County
- Settlements within Municipality: Tribunj

Government
  - Mayor: Marko Grubelić

Area
  - Village / Municipality: 15.3 km^{2} (5.9 sq mi)
  - Urban: 15.3 km^{2} (5.9 sq mi)

Population (2021)
  - Village / Municipality: 1,594
  - Density: 104/km^{2} (270/sq mi)
  - Urban: 1,594
  - Urban density: 104/km^{2} (270/sq mi)
- Postal code: 22212 Tribunj
- Website: tribunj.hr

Tribunj is a village and a municipality in Šibenik-Knin County, Croatia. It is located about three kilometers northwest of Vodice and is known for its peaceful waterfront cafes. The municipality has only one settlement, Tribunj, and a hamlet Sovlje, to the west. The municipality was formed in 2006, when the village of Tribunj separated from the Town of Vodice. Tribunj is the birthplace of famous pop-folk artist Mišo Kovač.

== History ==
- The town has been known in medieval ages as Jurjevgrad, it has a small peninsula connected to mainland with an old stone bridge.
- Every year at summer, Tribunj organises a Regional Donkey Race which has people racing on donkeys.

== Demographics ==
Municipality of Tribunj: Population trends 1857–2021
v

population	454	498	542	674	817	966	1041	1076	1133	1195	1075	1223	1110	1333	1390	1536	1594
	1857	1869	1880	1890	1900	1910	1921	1931	1948	1953	1961	1971	1981	1991	2001	2011	2021

Sources: Croatian Bureau of Statistics publications

== Sport ==
- NK Mladost Tribunj is from Tribunj.
