= Plešivica, Ljutomer =

Plešivica
- Location in Slovenia
- Coordinates: 46°29′4.01″N 16°11′11.7″E
- Country: Slovenia
- Traditional region: Styria
- Statistical region: Mura
- Municipality: Ljutomer

Area
  - Total: 1.16 km^{2} (0.45 sq mi)
- Elevation: 323.6 m (1,062 ft)

Population (2002)
  - Total: 86

Plešivica (pronounced [plɛˈʃiːʋitsa], in older sources also Plešivec, German: Pleschivetz) is a small settlement in the Slovene Hills (Slovene: Slovenske gorice) in the Municipality of Ljutomer in northeastern Slovenia. The area is part of the traditional region of Styria and is now included in the Mura Statistical Region.

== Name ==
The name Plješivica is common for mountains and hills with meadows on top, derived from the adjective plešiv 'bare, treeless'. The toponym can be either a proper noun or an appellative. In addition to other places and features named Plešivica, related Slavic geographical names include Pleševica, Plišivica, Plješevica, Plješivica, and Pljišivica.
