= Bilišane =

Settlement in Zadar County, Croatia

- Settlement
- Interactive map of Bilišane
- Location of Bilišane in Croatia
- Coordinates: 44°10′19″N 15°45′33″E
- Country: Croatia
- County: Zadar County
- City: Obrovac

Area
  - Total: 35.5 km^{2} (13.7 sq mi)

Population (2021)
  - Total: 136
  - Density: 3.83/km^{2} (9.92/sq mi)
- Time zone: UTC+1 (CET)
  - Summer (DST): UTC+2 (CEST)
- Postal code: 23450 Obrovac

Bilišane is a settlement in the City of Obrovac in Croatia. In 2021, its population was 136.

== Demographics ==
Bilišane: Population trends 1857–2021
v

population	884	952	956	1045	1249	1332	1009	1315	1064	1127	1146	1008	928	857	29	176	136
	1857	1869	1880	1890	1900	1910	1921	1931	1948	1953	1961	1971	1981	1991	2001	2011	2021

Sources: Croatian Bureau of Statistics publications
