= Plešivica, Žužemberk =

Plešivica Pleševica (until 1988)
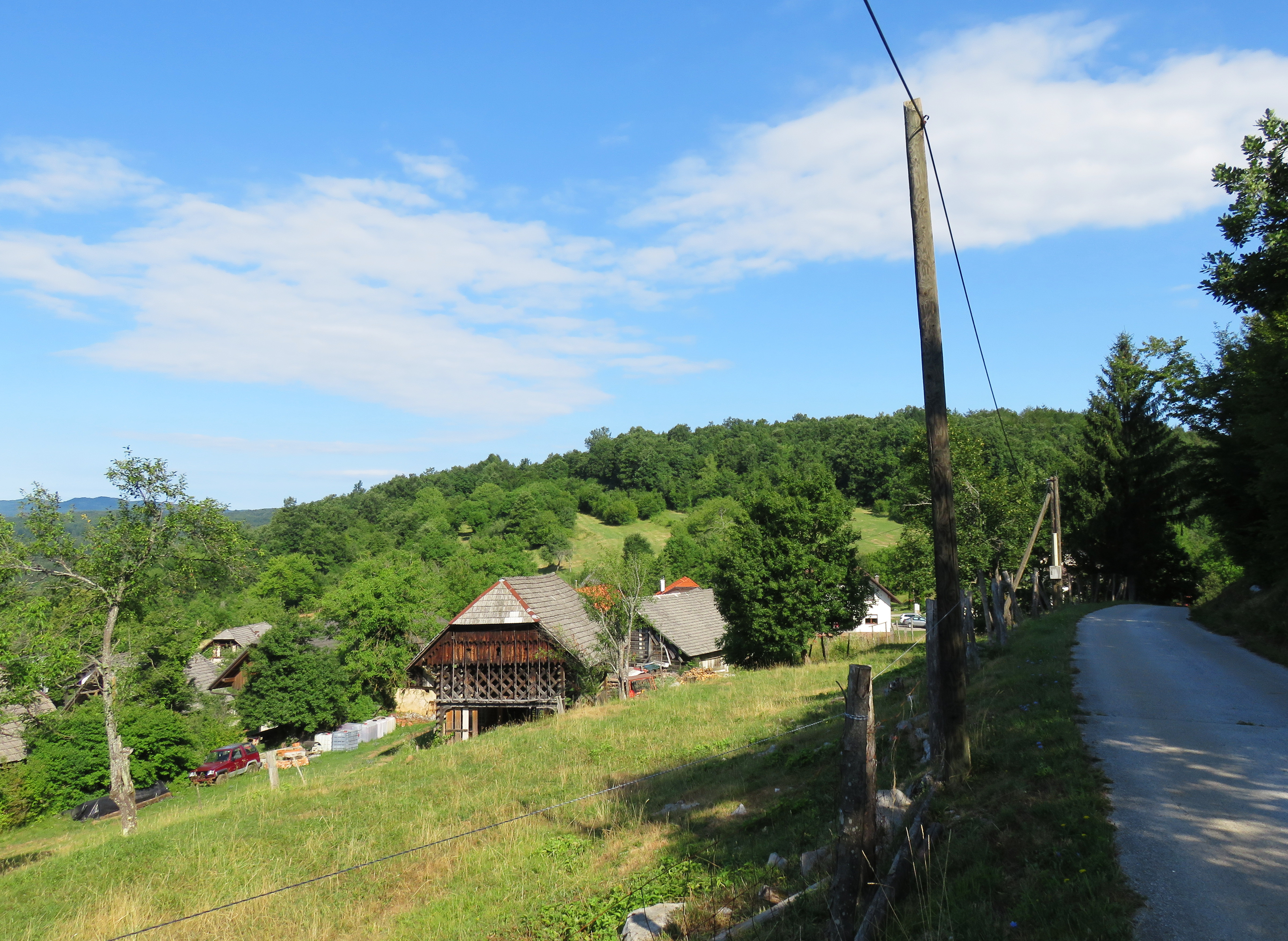

- Location in Slovenia
- Coordinates: 45°49′36.2″N 14°52′34.69″E
- Country: Slovenia
- Traditional region: Lower Carniola
- Statistical region: Southeast Slovenia
- Municipality: Žužemberk

Area
  - Total: 2.63 km^{2} (1.02 sq mi)
- Elevation: 403.9 m (1,325 ft)

Population (2002)
  - Total: 17

Plešivica (pronounced [plɛˈʃiːʋitsa]) is a small village in the Municipality of Žužemberk in southeastern Slovenia. The area is part of the historical region of Lower Carniola. The municipality is now included in the Southeast Slovenia Statistical Region.

== Name ==
The name of the settlement was changed from Pleševica to Plešivica in 1988.

The name Plješivica is common for mountains and hills with meadows on top, derived from the adjective plešiv 'bare, treeless'. The toponym can be either a proper noun or an appellative. In addition to other places and features named Plešivica, related Slavic geographical names include Pleševica, Plišivica, Plješevica, Plješivica, and Pljišivica.

== Church ==
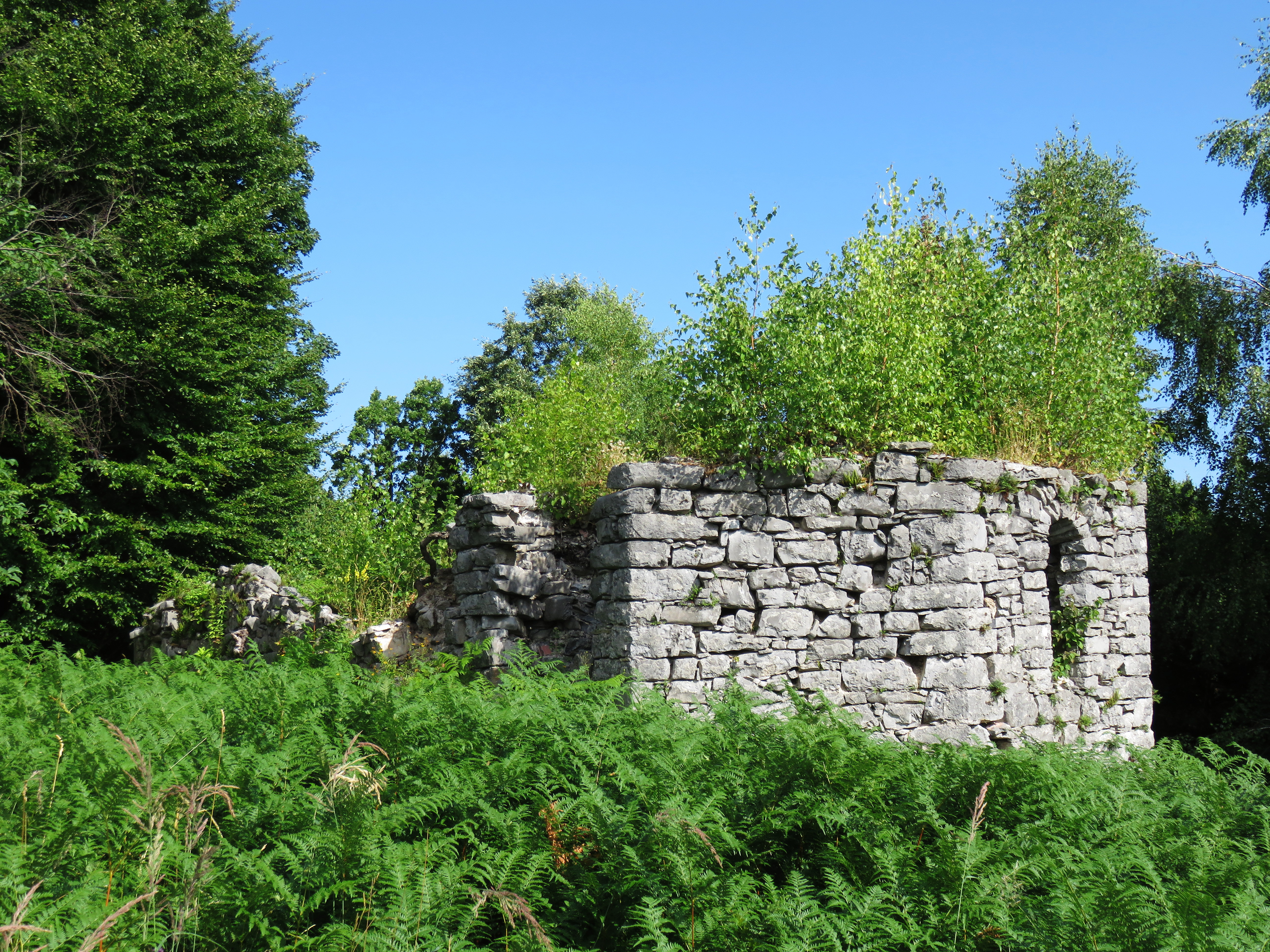
View from southeast

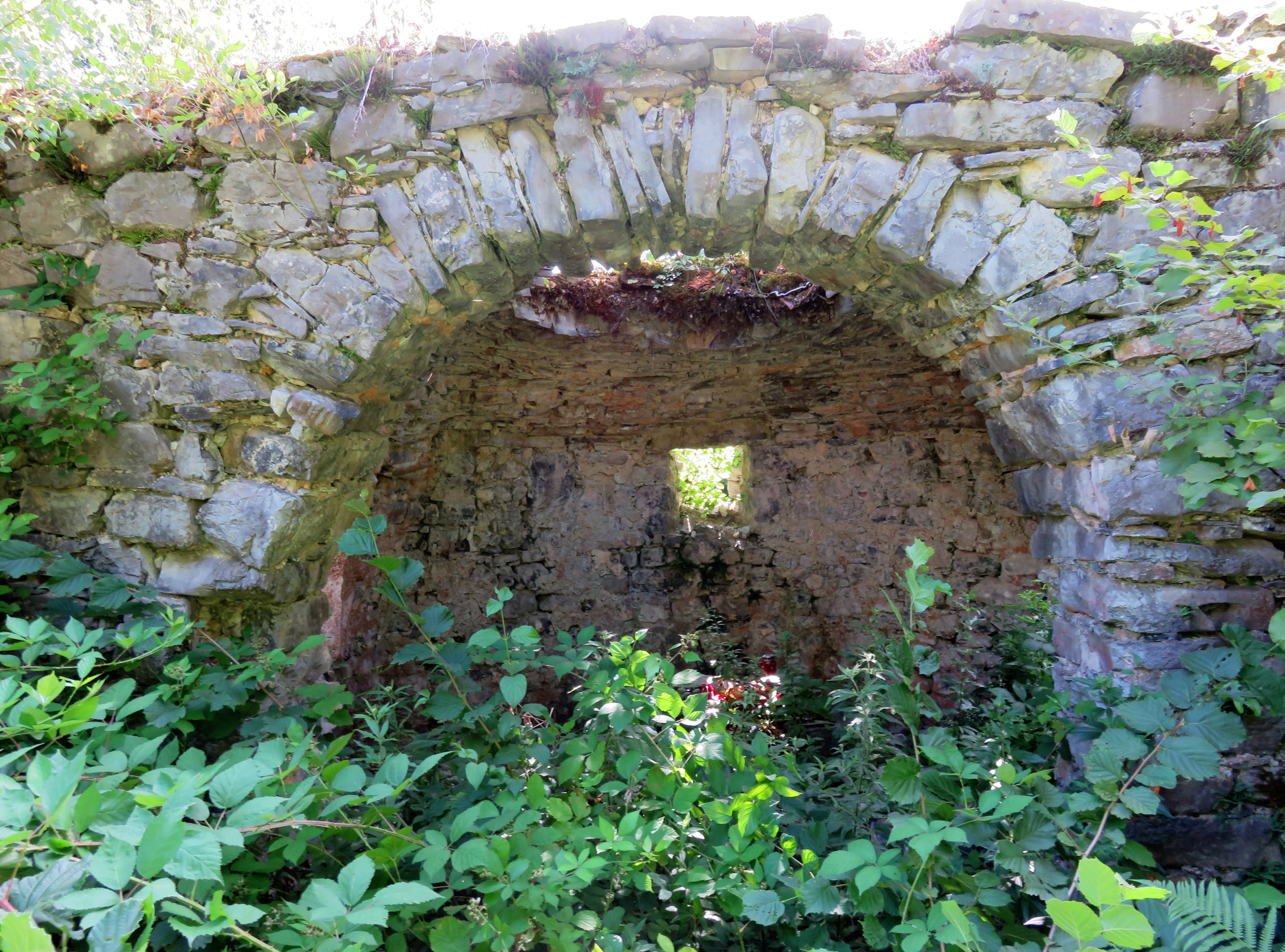
Chancel and altar

Ruins of Saint Catherine's Church

The local church, built on a hill east of the settlement, was dedicated to Saint Catherine and was first mentioned in written documents dating to 1526. It was burned down by the Partisans in 1943.
