= List of former populated places in Croatia =

List of ghost towns in Croatia contains towns and villages in Croatia which have no inhabitants.

== A ==
- Adolfovo
- Albertinovac
- Amatovci
- Antovo

== B ==
- Babin Potok
- Bačev Do
- Bačići
- Bačuga
- Bačun
- Bagalovići
- Baići
- Banki
- Banovo Selo
- Banja
- Barci
- Baretići
- Bašići
- Bašunje Male
- Bašunje Vele
- Bazje Novo
- Belobrajići
- Beloglavski Breg
- Belušići
- Benići
- Benići
- Benići Drivenički
- Benkovec
- Benkovići
- Benleva
- Bezjaki
- Bistrac
- Biškupec
- Bjelovac
- Bjeljevina
- Bjeljevine
- Blaškovići
- Blažani
- Blaževdol Psarjevački
- Blažići
- Blažići
- Blažići
- Bobići
- Bokanjac
- Bolfan Mali
- Bolfan Veliki
- Borje Lepoglavsko
- Borki
- Borojevci
- Brajinska
- Brda
- Brdo
- Breg Martinovski
- Brestje
- Breznica Klokočevačka
- Brezovci
- Brezovec Donji
- Brezovec Gornji
- Brezovo Polje Lukačko
- Brig
- Brnasi
- Bršljanica
- Brunkovac
- Brzaja
- Bučica
- Budainka
- Budići
- Budim
- Bukovac Visućki
- Bukovec
- Bukovec
- Bunje
- Burijaki

== C ==
- Caprag
- Carevo Brdo
- Cargnelli Villa
- Cenkovec
- Cerje
- Cernička Mala
- Cerovica
- Cerovići
- Ciganjšćak
- Cista Griva
- Cista Griva
- Cjepidlake
- Colnari
- Crkvena Ves
- Crna Mlaka
- Crnac Jezeranski
- Crni Dabar
- Crni Lug Glinski
- Crni Zatonj
- Crnogovci
- Cvetišće

== Č ==
- Čaglić
- Čaklovac
- Čamparovica
- Čandrli
- Čarapi
- Čehi
- Čemernica
- Čenkovo
- Čerišnjevica
- Češko Selo
- Čret
- Črnomerec
- Čučerje
- Čugovec
- Čuleti
- Čulinec
- Čulišić

== D ==
- Dajčići
- Dankovec
- Debelo Brdo
- Dedići
- Degidovec
- Deriguz
- Desna Luka
- Dešćevec
- Dijebala
- Dijelka
- Diklo
- Dirakovica
- Dobretin
- Dobrica
- Dobrova
- Dolac Crikvenički
- Dolanec
- Dolčani
- Dolec
- Dolinci
- Dolinci
- Doluš
- Doljani Zrmanjski
- Dolje
- Dolje Podsusedsko
- Domjani
- Donja Batina
- Donja Bedekovčina
- Donja Bedekovčina
- Donja Begovača
- Donja Buzeta
- Donja Dabrina
- Donja Kamenica
- Donja Klada
- Donja Lepoglava
- Donja Lovča
- Donja Lučelnica
- Donja Međa
- Donja Ploča
- Donja Subocka
- Donja Svedruža
- Donja Svedruža
- Donja Švica
- Donja Tijarica
- Donje Bilišane
- Donje Čelo
- Donje Jošane
- Donje Oroslavje
- Donje Oroslavje
- Donje Polonje
- Donje Prugovo
- Donje Rašćane
- Donje Selište
- Donje Selo
- Donje Selo
- Donje Škurinje
- Donje Vrapče
- Donje Vratno
- Donji Baćin
- Donji Brestovec
- Donji Brestovec
- Donji Bukovec
- Donji Dežanovac
- Donji Doljani
- Donji Ervenik
- Donji Frkašić
- Donji Gračec
- Donji Kirin
- Donji Labusi
- Donji Lukavec
- Donji Majkovi
- Donji Markuševec
- Donji Praputnik
- Donji Pribić
- Donji Prozor
- Donji Radošić
- Donji Rajić
- Donji Rukavac
- Donji Šajn
- Donji Sinac
- Donji Sroki
- Donji Starigrad
- Donji Zaklopca
- Došen Dabar
- Došen Duliba
- Dovičići
- Dračevac Zadarski
- Draga
- Draga Crikvenička
- Dragaljin
- Draganec
- Dragičevci
- Dragičevići
- Dragodid
- Dragonožec Gornji
- Dragonožec Donji
- Dragovine
- Dravski Kuti
- Draženovići
- Dražine
- Drenova
- Drenovac Brinjski
- Drenovac Radučki
- Drivenik-stanica
- Dubrava Farkašićka
- Dubrava
- Dubrava
- Dubrava Krmpotska
- Dubrava Markuševečka
- Dugi Dol Vrhovinski (1 household as at 2020)
- Dumenčići
- Dvorišće
- Dvorska

== F ==
- Fontana
- Frančići
- Franovići
- Frateršćica
- Frlanija
- Funčići

== G ==
- Gajišće
- Gakovo
- Galdovo
- Galdovo Erdedsko
- Garići
- Gerovski Kraj
- Gerovski Kraj
- Glavica
- Glavice
- Glavnica
- Glogovec Zaprudski
- Glogovnica
- Gljuščići
- Gojlo Kutinsko
- Goleši
- Goliki
- Golomičari
- Goljak
- Gorenci
- Gorenja Vas
- Gorica
- Gorica Lepoglavska
- Goričica
- Goričine
- Gornja Bedekovčina
- Gornja Bedekovčina
- Gornja Begovača
- Gornja Budičina
- Gornja Bukovica
- Gornja Buzeta
- Gornja Dabrina
- Gornja Kamenica
- Gornja Kustošija
- Gornja Lamana Draga
- Gornja Lovča
- Gornja Lučelnica
- Gornja Mala
- Gornja Međa
- Gornja Subocka
- Gornja Svedruža
- Gornja Svedruža
- Gornja Šuma
- Gornja Švica
- Gornja Tijarica
- Gornja Župa
- Gornjak
- Gornje Čelo
- Gornje Jelenje
- Gornje Jošane
- Gornje Oroslavlje
- Gornje Oroslavje
- Gornje Pazarište
- Gornje Polonje
- Gornje Prugovo
- Gornje Rašćane
- Gornje Selo
- Gornje Selo
- Gornje Vino
- Gornje Vino
- Gornje Vrapče
- Gornji Baćin
- Gornji Brestovec
- Gornji Brestovec
- Gornji Bukovec
- Gornji Cerovci
- Gornji Dežanovac
- Gornji Doljani
- Gornji Ervenik
- Gornji Gečkovec
- Gornji Gračec
- Gornji Jugi
- Gornji Kirin
- Gornji Kolarec
- Gornji Labusi
- Gornji Lukavec
- Gornji Majkovi
- Gornji Markuševec
- Gornji Mekinjar
- Gornji Poloj
- Gornji Praputnik
- Gornji Prozor
- Gornji Pustakovec
- Gornji Rabac
- Gornji Rajić
- Gornji Rukavac
- Gornji Sinac
- Gornji Stenjevec
- Gornji Šarampov
- Gornji Šarampov
- Gornji Tiškovac
- Gornji Vidovec
- Gornji Zaklopac
- Gorske Mokrice
- Gostovo Polje
- Grabar Prokički
- Grabarak
- Grabovac Donji
- Grabovac Gornji
- Grabrov
- Gračani
- Gradac
- Grahovljani
- Grančari
- Granešina
- Grašići
- Grbci
- Grdovčak
- Grđevica
- Grgurići
- Grintavica
- Grižane
- Grozići
- Grubiši
- Gruž-luka
- Gržančići
- Gržani
- Gržići
- Gučani
- Gudalji
- Gulići

== H ==
- Hlistići
- Hobari
- Holjevci
- Holjevci Jezeranski
- Hosnik
- Hosti
- Hrastilnica
- Hrastovica Vivodinska
- Hrelići
- Hrlići
- Humac

== I ==
- Istočna Plina
- Ivakuša
- Ivanci
- Ivanušići

== J ==
- Jablanac Jasenovački
- Jabukovac Donji
- Jabukovac Gornji
- Jačkovina
- Jagodišće
- Jagodna
- Jakobovac
- Jakuševec
- Jalševec
- Jamarje
- Jame
- Jankomir
- Janjevalj
- Jardasi
- Jarek Podsusedski
- Jargovo
- Jarun
- Jasik, Croatia
- Jašići
- Javorja
- Jelići, Croatia
- Jelkovec
- Jelovičani
- Jelovka
- Jelvica
- Jerčinovići
- Jezernice
- Jezero
- Jovanovac, Croatia
- Jukinac
- Jukini
- Jurčevec

== K ==
- Kabalna
- Kačjak
- Kal
- Kalanji
- Kali
- Kalić
- Kalinovica-zavod
- Kamenica
- Kamenica Brinjska
- Kamensko Vrbovsko
- Kamenjak
- Kanal
- Kaniški Vrhovec
- Kantrida
- Kapan
- Kapelica
- Kapelska Velika
- Kapelšćak
- Kapelšćak
- Karađorđevo Gradinsko
- Karaula
- Karin
- Kašćergani
- Kašina Doljnja
- Kašina Gornja
- Kaštel
- Kaštel
- Katići
- Katun
- Katun
- Katun Lindarski
- Katun Trviški
- Kature
- Kavrani
- Kičeri
- Kistanje Selo
- Kladešćica
- Klanac Mali
- Klanac Veliki
- Klanfari
- Klapavica Bruvanjska
- Klara
- Klarići
- Klasnić
- Klasnić Srednji
- Klenik
- Kloštar Šiljevički
- Klupci
- Klupci
- Kmačići
- Kmeti
- Kobiljak
- Kobiljak Sesvetski
- Kočičin
- Kodolje
- Kokanj
- Kometnik
- Konjarići
- Konjci
- Kopčić-Brdo
- Korenovo
- Korensko
- Kosanovići
- Kosavin
- Kosica Skradska
- Kostanjek
- Kostelj
- Košac
- Kotišina
- Kotor
- Kozo
- Kraj
- Kraj Gornji
- Kraljevec Sesvetski
- Krapinica I
- Krapinica II
- Krasa
- Krasnica
- Krašovec
- Kravlje
- Krčevo
- Krči
- Kričina
- Kričke Donje
- Kričke Gornje
- Kričke Srednje
- Kriva
- Krivaja Naseobina
- Križišće
- Krpani
- Krpec
- Krtobreg
- Kruna
- Krvarići
- Kuće Donje
- Kuće Gornje
- Kuhari
- Kukar
- Kukuruzari
- Kula
- Kulica
- Kunčani
- Kupari
- Kurilovec
- Kurilovec Donji
- Kurilovec Gornji
- Kustošija
- Kutanja
- Kuzma
- Kuzmići
- Kvitrovec

== L ==
- Ladvić
- Lakoselci
- Lanka Leševo
- Lapad
- Lašćina
- Laze
- Ledine Molvanske
- Lekenik Erdedski
- Lekenik Turopoljski
- Leskovčec
- Letina
- Lijepa Greda
- Linarići
- Lipe
- Lipnik
- Lipovčani
- Lipovec
- Lipovica
- Lisičina
- Lištrovac
- Loborski Ratkovec
- Lokmeri
- Lokvica Dramaljska
- Lonja Ivanićka
- Lonja Kratečka
- Lovrinići
- Lučane
- Lug Dabarski
- Lukeži
- Lukić Draga
- Lukšići
- Lupoglav Ledenički

== Lj ==
- Ljubljanica

== M ==
- Macelj
- Mačini
- Mačkovec
- Majkovac Podravski
- Makar
- Mala
- Mala
- Mala Gorica Samoborska
- Mala Gorica Turopoljska
- Mala Kraska
- Mala Londžica
- Mala Maslenjača
- Mala Polača
- Mala Popina
- Mala Traba
- Male Dražice
- Mali Bolč
- Mali Brezani
- Mali Broćanac
- Mali Ježenj
- Mali Kozlovčak
- Mali Kut
- Mali Maj
- Mali Prokop
- Mali Rastovac
- Mali Slatnjak
- Mali Škrip
- Mali Zdenčac
- Malinci
- Malo Gaćište
- Malo Grablje
- Malo Nabrđe
- Malo Prljevo
- Manestri
- Marići, Rovišće
- Marići
- Marinkovac
- Marinović - Brdo
- Markci
- Martinci Zlatarski
- Martinci Zlatarski
- Martinska Ves
- Marušići
- Maslarac
- Materada Maj
- Matijuci
- Matiki
- Mavri
- Mavrići
- Medići
- Medvedička
- Medvedski Breg
- Međugorje Suhopoljsko
- Meja
- Meja Gaj
- Mekinjar
- Melnice Hreljinske
- Meminska
- Merolino Sikirevačko
- Miholjački Karlovac
- Miholjački Karlovac
- Miholjice
- Mikulići
- Milešine
- Milićevo Selo
- Milićevo Selo
- Milićevo Selo
- Milisavci
- Milotići
- Miroševec
- Miroši
- Mišljenovići Moravički
- Mitrovica Gradinska
- Mlinoga
- Mlinovi
- Mlinska
- Močibobi
- Mofardini
- Moslavački Krivaj
- Mošun
- Mračaj Zrmanjski

== N ==
- Naukovac
- Neteča
- Noskovići
- Nova Brezovica
- Nova Cabuna
- Nova Gradina
- Nova Marča
- Novak
- Novaki Granešinski
- Novaki I
- Novaki II
- Novaki Kraljevečki
- Novaki Mali
- Novaki Veliki
- Novaković-gorica
- Nove Hiže
- Novi Budakovac
- Novi Čakovci
- Novi Dol
- Novi Kobaš
- Novi Kršan
- Novi Laminac
- Novi Sisak
- Novi Zoljan
- Novo Selo Lekeničko
- Novoselec Granešinski
- Nugla

== O ==
- Obljaj
- Obod
- Obor
- Obrijež
- Obrš
- Obršje
- Obuljeno
- Odvorci
- Okrug
- Omar
- Opatovina
- Oporovec
- Oprasi
- Oraovica
- Orašje
- Orbanići Gorenji
- Orehovica
- Orešnjak
- Orlići
- Orovac Otočki
- Otočec Zaprudski
- Otok Zaprudski
- Otok-Duba
- Otrić
- Ovčara
- Ovčara Suhopoljska

== P ==
- Paprata
- Pasičina
- Pastuša
- Pašac
- Pašijan
- Pauci
- Pecka
- Pecka Mala
- Pecka Velika
- Pećca
- Pećine
- Peljaki
- Perinovo
- Perjavica
- Perkovići Brinjski
- Perna Dolnja
- Perna Gornja
- Pernjak
- Petar
- Petešljari
- Petrinovići
- Petrovac Feričanački
- Petrovići
- Petruševec
- Pilepići
- Pionirski Grad
- Planina
- Planjane
- Plase (Croatia)
- Pleso
- Plešivička Reka
- Plina
- Plišići
- Plitvica
- Ploče
- Ploščica
- Plužnice
- Podbrezovica
- Podbrezovica
- Podbrežje
- Podgori
- Podgorje
- Podgorje
- Podgrič
- Podgora Turkovska
- Podkuk
- Podljut
- Podomar
- Podotočje
- Podrto
- Podskoči
- Podslemeni Lazi
- Podsopalj Belgradski
- Podsopalj Drivenički
- Podsused
- Podugrinac
- Poduljin
- Podvaroš
- Podvoljak
- Poljana Breška
- Poljane
- Polje
- Poljice
- Poljice
- Popov Dol
- Popovec
- Posert
- Prečko
- Prigradica
- Prisoje
- Prizdrina
- Prnjarovec
- Prokop
- Proložac
- Prosinja
- Prvo Selo
- Pučki
- Puhari
- Puhari
- Pulići
- Purga Lepoglavska
- Purga Pleška
- Purgarija
- Putari
- Pužev Breg
- Puži

== R ==
- Rabinja
- Račak
- Radotići
- Radovići
- Rajakovići
- Rajkovići
- Rakarje
- Rasohe
- Raštane
- Ravnice
- Razdrto
- Razvađe Donje
- Razvađe Gornje
- Razvala
- Rebar
- Reka Nova
- Reka Stara
- Reljčevo
- Remete (Croatia)
- Remetinec Stupnički
- Resnički Gaj
- Resnik
- Retfala Mađarska
- Retfala Njemačka
- Retkovec
- Ribnjača
- Ričina
- Riđica
- Rogočana Vela
- Rogolje
- Ropci
- Rudele u Polju
- Rudeš
- Ruhci
- Rujišta
- Runkovci
- Ružić Selo
- Ružić Veli

== S ==
- Sadilovac
- Saftići
- San Michele
- Satrić Gornji
- Sela Sesvetska
- Selakova Poljana
- Selce Dramaljsko
- Selišćak
- Selišće Letovanićko
- Selište
- Selnica
- Selnica
- Selnica Sesvetska
- Selnički Vrh
- Selno Donje
- Selno Donje
- Selno Gornje
- Selno Gornje
- Selo
- Semičevići
- Senjsko
- Seoce
- Seoci
- Sertići Jezeranski
- Sertići Stajnički
- Sestranec
- Sesvete
- Skočibe
- Skrbići
- Slana Voda
- Slanovec
- Slatina
- Slatinski Lipovac
- Slavčići
- Smišljak
- Smokovo
- Smrdelje
- Smrka
- Sopaljska
- Sopnica Sesvetska
- Sorbar
- Spagnolli
- Spinčići Donji
- Spinčići Gornji
- Srb
- Srbinjak
- Srdoči
- Srebrenik
- Sredina Sela
- Srednja Lovča
- Srednja Lučelnica
- Srednji Borki
- Srednji Hrib
- Sremac-Ekonomija
- Srida Sela
- Srida Sela
- Srpski Klanac
- Sršenik
- Sršenovići
- Stabljevac
- Stanetinski Breg
- Stanić
- Stanica Buzet
- Stara Brezovica
- Stara Gradina
- Stari Budakovac
- Stari Laminac
- Stari Pazin
- Stari Sisak
- Stari Zoljan
- Staro Selo
- Staro Selo
- Steklice
- Stenjevec
- Strmice
- Strožanac
- Struge
- Stubica Gomirska
- Stupnica
- Stupnik
- Subocka
- Subocki Grad
- Sudaraž
- Sušak
- Sušik
- Sušobreg
- Sušobreg
- Suvaja, Croatia
- Sv. Vid
- Sveta Jelena Donja
- Sveta Jelena Gornja
- Sveta Katarina
- Sveta Margita
- Sveti Franjo
- Sveti Jakov
- Sveti Juraj na Bregu
- Sveti Mikula
- Sveti Uldarik
- Sveti Vid
- Svilno

== Š ==
- Šafari
- Šajini
- Šarari
- Šaškovec
- Šavki
- Šćedin
- Šebreki
- Šegine
- Šehovac
- Šemnica Radobojska
- Šemnica Radobojska
- Šestine
- Šestinski Kraljevec
- Šibrlička
- Šijska Kosa
- Šiljevica
- Šimići
- Šimunovec
- Šipki Donji
- Šipki Donji
- Šipki Gornji
- Šipki Gornji
- Škabići
- Škalić
- Škrapna
- Špadići
- Špansko
- Štale
- Štefanec Mali
- Štefanec Veliki
- Štefani
- Štefanovec
- Štinjan
- Štrigovčak
- Šumec
- Šumećica
- Šumetlica
- Šupera
- Šupljini
- Šurani
- Šušnjara
- Šušnji

== T ==
- Taborište
- Tepšin Dol
- Tijani
- Tomičini
- Torčec Ludbreški
- Trebež
- Trebež
- Trebišća
- Tribalj Gornji
- Tribotinj
- Trnava
- Trnava Resnička
- Trnova Poljana
- Trnovitica
- Trnovo
- Trsat
- Trstenik
- Trški Lazi
- Trtnji
- Turčinovići
- Turić
- Turinovo Selo
- Tušići
- Tužević

== U ==
- Uble
- Učka
- Ugrini
- Ukotići
- Umag-Komunela
- Ustrine Velike

== V ==
- Vagan
- Vagan Osredački
- Valač
- Valle
- Varljeni
- Varljeni
- Varoš
- Varoški Vrhovci
- Vašanska
- Važminec
- Vele Dražice
- Veli Ježenj
- Veli Maj
- Veli Škrip
- Velika Londžica
- Velika Maslenjača
- Velika Polača
- Veliki Bolč
- Veliki Brezani
- Veliki Kozlovčak
- Veliki Kut
- Veliki Slatnjak
- Veliki Strmendolac
- Veliki Zdenčac
- Veliko Brdo
- Veliko Nabrđe
- Veliko Prljevo
- Veliko Selo
- Ves Klenovnička
- Ves Lepoglavska
- Vezac Donji
- Vežica Donja
- Vežica Gornja
- Vidovec
- Vidovec
- Vidovec
- Viduševac
- Vinišće-biskupija
- Vinišće-opatija
- Vinkovačko Novo Selo
- Vinjani
- Visoče
- Visoki Brijeg
- Vitoševo
- Vlaška Kapela
- Vojvoduša
- Volosko
- Vrandolac
- Vranići Kod Poreča
- Vrapče
- Vrbanec
- Vrbanec
- Vrbovačko Brdo
- Vrbovica
- Vrbovsko Gomirsko
- Vrh Desne
- Vrijeska
- Vrnik
- Vrtljine
- Vučetići
- Vugrovec
- Vukelić Draga
- Vukojevac
- Vukomerec
- Vukovje
- Vukšinac

== Z ==
- Zablaće
- Zabrežje
- Zadublje
- Zagolik
- Zagrad Drivenički
- Zaile
- Zajerci
- Zakrajc Brodski
- Zakrajc Turkovski
- Zala Draga
- Zamaslina
- Zamet
- Zapadna Plina
- Zapolica
- Zapolje Dabarsko
- Zastene
- Završje
- Zbitke
- Zdenčina
- Zebanec
- Zlobinsko Brdo
- Zoričići

== Ž ==
- Žikovci
- Žirovac
- Žitnjak
- Živica
- Žižek
- Žlebec
- Žnjidari
- Žugaj
- Županje Selo
- Županjol Albertinovac
