= 1964 Slavonia earthquake =

Earthquake in Slavonia, Croatia

1964 Dilj earthquake
- Location within Croatia
- UTC time: 1964-04-13 08:30:03
- ISC event: 868700
- USGS-ANSS: ComCat
- Local date: April 13, 1964
- Local time: 09:30:03 CET
- Magnitude: 5.6 M_{L} 5.7 M_{w}
- Depth: 32 km (20 mi)
- Epicenter: 45.3°N 18.1°E
- Max. intensity: MMI VII (Very strong)
- Casualties: 3 fatalities

On April 13, 1964, an earthquake occurred at the Dilj mountain near the towns of Slavonski Brod and Đakovo in Slavonia, Croatia (at the time part of SFR Yugoslavia). A number of people were killed, and the damage to vulnerable structures was extensive.

== Geological location ==
Slavonia, the eastern part of Croatia, is located on the Eurasian plate. The mountains of Psunj, Papuk, Krndija, and Dilj are considered less seismically active than others in the country. An earthquake was recorded in the vicinity of Đakovo in 1884.

== Earthquake ==
The earthquake measured 5.7 on the moment magnitude scale. The tremor was assigned VII (Very strong) on the Modified Mercalli intensity scale.

The epicenter was near the towns of Slavonski Brod and Đakovo.

== Damage and casualties ==
While the initial reporting on the earthquake in Glas Slavonije did not indicate a severe event, within a few days it became apparent that the damage would be measured in billions of Yugoslav dinars.

On April 24, the newly-founded Disaster Protection Headquarters of the Osijek kotar reported its initial findings of 17 billion dinars worth of damage to public and private buildings.

A 5th grade pupil died when a staircase collapsed in the "Ivan Goran Kovačić" elementary school in Đakovo. At the end of April, official reports also listed one other fatality, but because the deceased person was not named, this information was not necessarily reliable. Another fatality was reportedly in Slavonski Brod, as well as a person in the village of Karavukovo in the nearby western Vojvodina. Another man from Belgrade suffered a fatal stroke during the earthquake.

The NCEI Global Historical Hazard Database cites 3 fatalities from this earthquake.

In response to the earthquake, the government established a reconstruction fund, which managed to raise around 3 billion dinars in 1964. It disbursed the funds to the affected municipalities in the following ratios: Slavonski Brod 77%, Ðakovo 17% and Slavonska Požega 6%.

In the Đakovo region, the Yugoslav People's Army sent 100 and then up to 200 tents to accommodate the people most affected, as well as food and clothing. The worst affected villages were Musić, Lapovci, Hrkanovci, Ovčara, Paučje, Slobodna Vlast, Levanjska Varoš, Vučevci and Ivanovci. The damage included the destruction of 301 residential buildings and damage to 5,291 more. Nine schools were rendered unusable, affecting around 1,000 students, and 43 more were damaged, affecting about 8,000 more. The medical facilities in Đakovo were damaged to the extent that they had to be demolished, while significant damage was also recorded in several other villages, including on veterinarian stations, the Đakovo Cathedral, and other historical churches.

In the Slavonski Brod region, the worst affected places were the city itself, and the villages of Ježevik, Bukovlje, Vranovci, Podcrkavlje, Podvinje, Kindrovo and others, where more than half the building stock was damaged. In the city, over 500 buildings were damaged, including almost all of the schools, and the Đuro Đaković and other factories.

== Impact ==
The earthquake was felt as far away as Zagreb, Belgrade and Sarajevo, the major nearby cities of Yugoslavia.

The earthquake caused a wide area of Slavonia to enter a period of several years of reconstruction, made longer because of a bad economic situation and the unfortunate circumstance of the country's resources already being spread thin on recovery from other significant earthquakes.

== See also ==
- 1962 Makarska earthquakes
- 1963 Skopje earthquake
- 1969 Banja Luka earthquake
- List of earthquakes in 1964
- List of earthquakes in Croatia

== Sources ==
- Laus, Franica; Glamuzina, Nikola (2024). "The causes and mechanism of earthquakes in Croatia in the modern period - An educational perspective". Školski vjesnik: Journal for Pedagogic Theory and Practice. 73 (1).
- Josipović Batorek, Slađana (2013). "Potres u Đakovštini 1964. godine". Zbornik Muzeja Đakovštine (in Croatian). 11 (1).
