= Jezernice =

Jezernice may refer to:

- Jezernice, Czech Republic, a municipality and village in the Olomouc Region
- Jezernice, Croatia, an uninhabited village in Zagreb County
- Jezernice (Višegrad), a village in Bosnia and Herzegovina
