= Karlovac (disambiguation) =

Karlovac is a city in Croatia.

Karlovac may also refer to:

- Karlovac Feričanački, a village near Orahovica, Croatia
- Karlovac, Glamoč, a village in Bosnia and Herzegovina
- Banatski Karlovac, a village in Serbia
- Miholjački Karlovac, a former village near Viljevo, Croatia

== See also ==
- Karlovci (disambiguation)
