= Reka, Moravče =

Reka
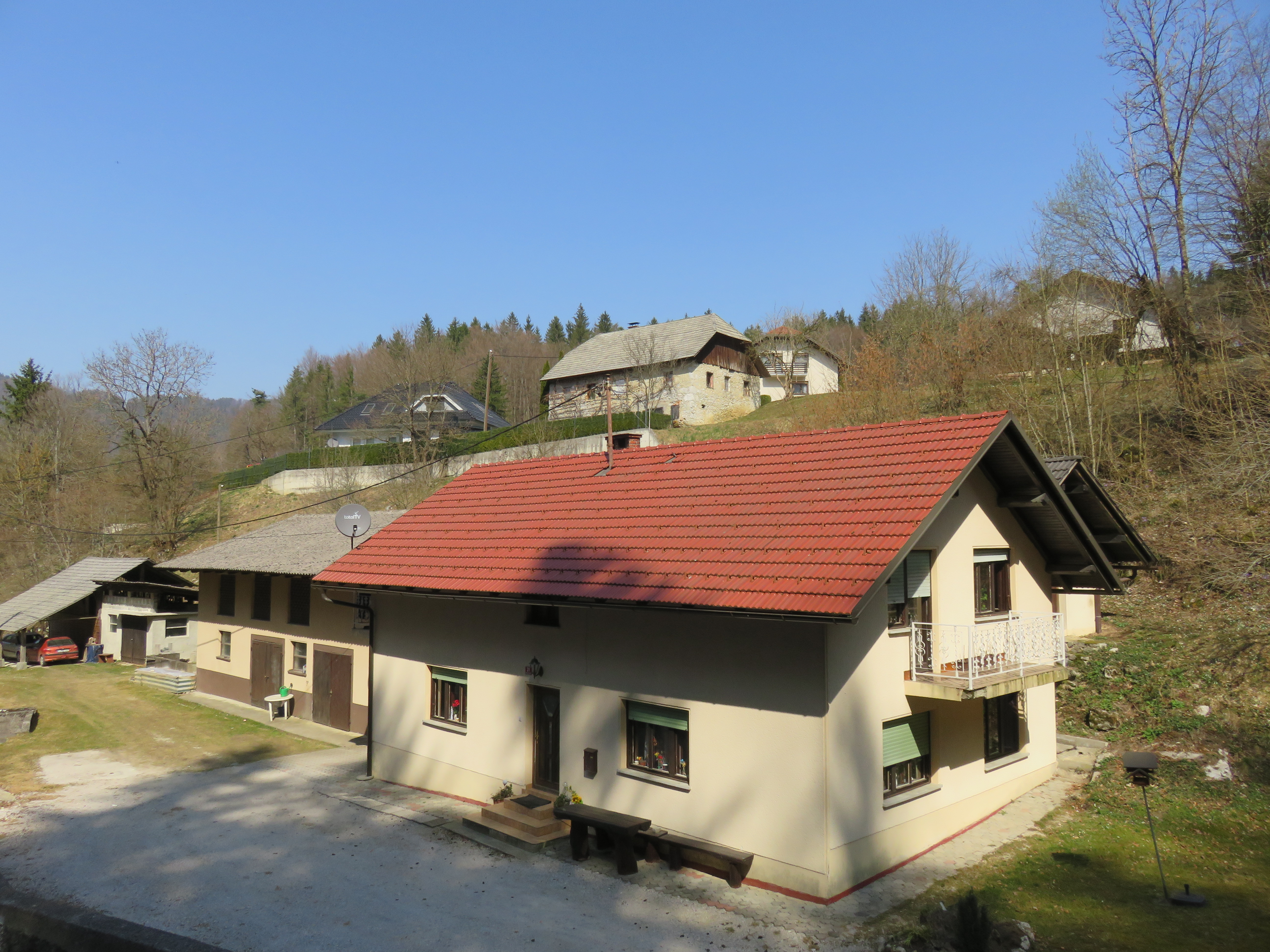

- Location in Slovenia
- Coordinates: 46°8′17″N 14°48′16″E
- Country: Slovenia
- Traditional region: Upper Carniola
- Statistical region: Central Slovenia
- Municipality: Moravče
- Elevation: 410 m (1,350 ft)

Reka (Slovene pronunciation: [ˈɾeːka]) is a former settlement in the Municipality of Moravče in central Slovenia. It is now part of the village of Gora pri Pečah. The area is part of the traditional region of Upper Carniola. The municipality is now included in the Central Slovenia Statistical Region.

== Geography ==
Reka lies along Drtijščica Creek, north of the main road from Moravče to Mlinše.

== History ==
Reka had a population of 17 living in two houses in 1900. Reka was annexed by Gora pri Pečah (at that time still called Gora svetega Florjana) in 1952, ending its existence as an independent settlement.
