= Malo Nabrđe =

- Village
- Location within Croatia
- Coordinates: 45°19′N 18°14′E
- Country: Croatia

Population (2011)
  - Total: 0
- Time zone: UTC+1 (CET)
  - Summer (DST): UTC+2 (CEST)

Malo Nabrđe is an uninhabited settlement in Croatia.

== Name ==
The larger village of Veliko Nabrđe was first mentioned in 1422 as possesio et districtus Naburgia, part of the Nevna (now Levanjska Varoš) fief. Further mentions are in 1428 as Naborgya, 1467 as Nabergye and Naberge and 1474 as Nabergye.

After the reconquest of the village from the Ottoman Empire at the end of the 17th century, the area was settled by Orthodox Vlachs from eastern Bosnia. In 1702, the population of Nabrđe was 19 settled families, of which 15 Orthodox and 4 Catholic. In the 18th century, its population grew to about 50 houses with 300 people. The number of Orthodox households grew notably in the 18th and 19th centuries. At the beginning of the 19th century, about 20 Catholic, Croatian families settled in Nabrđe. Because of constant quarrels with their Orthodox, Serb neighbours, about 20 families of Nabrđe left southward in the middle of the 19th century to form Malo Nabrđe, following which Nabrđe became Veliko Nabrđe.

== History ==
During WWII, the treatment of the Serbs in 1941 led to an uprising. The Serb uprising led to the territory of Malo Nabrđe becoming a war zone by the summer of 1942. Because of the resulting insecurity, most ethnically German families left. Then from the beginning of 1943 on, Croat families with members in the Croatian or German army became endangered.

The mass expulsions of Serbs in Malo Nabrđe began at the beginning of August 1942. All Serbs had to leave their homes, take no more than food for 7 days and drive their livestock to a gathering point. During the night, the villages were surrounded by strong Ustaša and Domobran forces. Once they were rounded up, a 4–5 kilometres (2.5–3.1 mi) long column of over 2200 Serbs was driven to Đakovo. In Đakovo, their belongings were confiscated at the fair grounds. Men were separated from the women and children and transported by livestock wagons to the Jasenovac concentration camp, while women and children were transported to the Stara Gradiška concentration camp, where mothers were separated from their children, who were transferred to a reception point in Zagreb.

A 2017 review of existing literature for Malo Nabrđe revealed that a total of 44 residents were killed during WWII, of which 28 as civilians and 16 as soldiers. Of the dead, 19 were Serbs, of which 14 victims of the Jasenovac camp (including 2 girls and 1 boy) and 1 of the Stara Gradiška camp. 5 of the Serb victims were women. The remaining 25 were Croats, Germans and Hungarians. But an in-depth study revealed problems with the existing literature. Their final list of victims (for which they acknowledge confirmation is still lacking for many individuals):

- Mirko Vinković (28 August 1913, Malo Nabrđe – Šamac–Modriča road, 14 April 1941), Croat, civilian (functionary), shot and bayonetted in the chest while held hostage since Đakovo by the JV
- Josef "Jozo" Belfinger (16 March 1904, Malo Nabrđe – Lapovci, 26 April 1942), German, SS, killed by Partisans
- Kata (Maksima) Uzelac (1892, Malo Nabrđe or Paučje – Jasenovac, 1942), Serb, civilian, died in concentration camp
- Simo (Kosta) Stanivuković (1903, Malo Nabrđe – Jasenovac, 1942), Serb, civilian, died in concentration camp
- Mlađen/Mladen (Mile) Uzelac (14 February 1889, Malo/Veliko Nabrđe – Jasenovac, 1942), Serb, civilian, died in concentration camp
- Milica (Milenko) Uzelac (1941, Malo/Veliko Nabrđe – Malo Nabrđe or Jasenovac, 1942), Serb, civilian, killed by Ustaše in her house or in Jasenovac
- Živko (Mile) Uzelac (3 February 1902, Malo/Veliko Nabrđe – Malo Nabrđe or Jasenovac, 1942), Serb, civilian, died in concentration camp
- Nikola "Mika" Josipović (11 April 1918, Malo Nabrđe – Okučani, 15 November 1942), Croat, Domobran, killed by Partisans
- Tomo Josipović (1921, Kondrić – Blagaj, 1942), Croat, Domobran
- Anton "Toni" Luiser (17 January 1902, Malo Nabrđe – Malo Nabrđe, 11 January 1943), German, SS, killed by Partisans in his bed
- Josef Luiser (26 October 1910, Malo Nabrđe – Stalingrad, 2 February 1943), German, 369th Wehrmacht, killed by Red Army
- Ivan Ujvari (20 June 1922, Malo Nabrđe or Gašinci – Teslić, 10 July 1943), Hungarian, Domobran, killed by Partisans
- Franjo "Fero" Lujzer (1 June 1914, Malo Nabrđe – Perušić, 14 August 1943), German Croat, Oružništvo, killed by Partisans
- Johann Luiser (1918, Malo Nabrđe – Đakovo, 14 December 1943), German, civilian, (Note: But buried in military cemetery.) killed by Partisans
- Franjo Zupan/Cupan (30 May 1909, Malo Nabrđe – Đakovo, 14 December 1943 or 13 April 1945), Croat, Ustaša, (Note: Alternatly Wehrmacht or Domobran.) killed by Partisans in 1943 or 1945
- Ilija (Pane) Uzelac (27 July 1899, Malo Nabrđe – Jasenovac, 1943/1944), Serb, civilian, died in concentration camp
- Ljubica (Luka) Uzelac (1887, Malo/Veliko Nabrđe – Jasenovac, 1943/1944), Serb, civilian, died in concentration camp
- Petar (Vaso) Uzelac (1925, Malo/Veliko Nabrđe – Jasenovac, 1943/1944), Serb, civilian, died in concentration camp
- Vaso (David) Uzelac (1897, Veliko/Malo Nabrđe – Jasenovac, 1943/1944), Serb, civilian, died in concentration camp
- Božo (David) Uzelac (1887/1885, Veliko/Malo Nabrđe – Jasenovac, 1943/1944), Serb, civilian, died in concentration camp
- Milan (Pane) Uzelac (1904, Malo Nabrđe – Jasenovac, 1943/1944), Serb, civilian, died in concentration camp
- Milosava (Milovana) Simić (1935, Paučje – Malo Nabrđe, 1943), Serb, civilian, killed by Ustaše in her house
- Nikola (Tanasko) Stojaković (1877, Malo/Veliko Nabrđe – Malo Nabrđe, 1943), Serb, civilian, killed in his house
- Ivan (Stjepan) Terek (1925, Malo Nabrđe – 1943), Croat, Partisan, KIA
- Antun "Periša" Štefančić (15 January 1928, Gašinci or Malo Nabrđe – Malo Nabrđe, 18 April 1944), Croat, civilian, killed in his house by Partisans
- Ivan "Ivo" Josipović (18 August 1920, Malo Nabrđe – Paučje, 10 July 1944), Croat, Domobran, killed by OZNA
- Ivan Horvat (31 May 1918, Malo Nabrđe – Nova Gradiška, 15 September 1944), Croat, Domobran, killed by Partisans
- Milorad (Nikola) Stojaković (1894, Malo/Veliko Nabrđe – Jasenovac, 1944), Serb, died in concentration camp
- Branko (Pero) Simić (1907, Malo Nabrđe – Poganovci, 1944), Serb, Partisan, KIA
- Ivan "Ivo" Rapić (17 April 1924, Malo Nabrđe – Bleiburg, 15 May 1945), Croat, civilian, killed by Partisans
- Petar "Pero" Rapić (19 June 1925, Malo Nabrđe – Bleiburg, 15 May 1945), Croat, civilian, killed by Partisans
- Stipo Vinković (23 January 1908, Malo Nabrđe – Slavonski Brod, 30 June 1945), Croat, Ustaša, captured in Đakovo and killed in the Slavonski Brod concentration camp
- Johann Luiser (27 December 1919, Malo Nabrđe – Đakovo 14 December 1945), German Croat, SS, killed by Partisans
- Luka Josipović (13 June 1924, Malo Nabrđe – Sesvete on 8 May or Ruševo/Paučje on 20 June 1945), Croat, Domobran who died in Sesvete or Ustaša captured and executed in Ruševo or Paučje
- Antun Mikola (1925, Malo Nabrđe – Sombor, 1945), Hungarian, Partisan, KIA
- Marko Barišić (1927, Malo Nabrđe – ?), Croat, civilian, missing, killed by Partisans

In addition to these, Pavao "Pal" Talas, born 15 November 1904 in Preslatinci but a resident of Malo Nabrđe, is recorded as having been killed by Serbs of Veliko Nabrđe, either in Malo or in Veliko Nabrđe, on 13 January 1948, supposedly out of a desire for revenge.

In 1962–1963, the population was forcibly resettled elsewhere to make room for the Sutjeska Military Training Grounds of the Yugoslav People's Army.

== Demographics ==
The parish birth and death registers were destroyed during WWII, though a few retrospective death notes were left in the parish register that began 2 June 1946, and residents of Malo Nabrđe were sometimes entered in the registries of surrounding parishes.

The inhabitants of Malo Nabrđe were mainly Croats, followed by Germans and Hungarians, with a small Serb minority.

As a consequence of WWII, the population of Malo Nabrđe had fallen to 240 in September 1945, compared to 267 in 1931, though this was a much smaller difference than in the neighbouring Serb village of Veliko Nabrđe, where from 1931 to 1948 the population declined from 920 to 413.

In 1964, it was erased from the registry of settlements (Serbo-Croatian: imenik naselja).

Village of Malo Nabrđe: Population trends 1857–2021
v

| population | 140 | 168 | 144 | 187 | 230 | 248 | 236 | 267 | 219 | 224 | 211 |
| | 1857 | 1869 | 1880 | 1890 | 1900 | 1910 | 1921 | 1931 | 1948 | 1953 | 1961 | 1971 | 1981 | 1991 | 2001 | 2011 | 2021 |

Sources: Croatian Bureau of Statistics publications

== Religion ==
Malo Nabrđe had a Catholic church, belonging to Drenje parish.

== Governance ==
Administratively, Malo and Veliko Nabrđe belonged to Gašinci, and together they encompassed 5660 morgens, of which 52.6% forest, 30.9% field.

== Infrastructure ==
Malo Nabrđe had its own Volksschule.

== Bibliography ==
- Geiger, Vladimir; Šola, Pero (2017-10-31). "Žrtvoslov Malog Nabrđa – Drugi svjetski rat i poraće: pokušaj revizije podataka o ljudskim gubitcima nestalog i zaboravljenog slavonskog sela" [The List of Victims of Malo Nabrđe – World War II and the Post-War Period: An Attempt of Data Revision on Human Losses in a Vanished and Forgotten Slavonian Village]. Scrinia Slavonica: Godišnjak Podružnice za povijest Slavonije, Srijema i Baranje Hrvatskog instituta za povijest (in Serbo-Croatian). 17: 291–378. eISSN 1848-9109.
