= Hrastovica =

Hrastovica may refer to:

- Hrastovica, Mokronog-Trebelno, a village in the municipality of Mokronog-Trebelno, Slovenia
- Hrastovica, Croatia, a village in the municipality of Petrinja, Croatia
- Hrastovica Vivodinska, a village in the municipality of Ozalj, Croatia
