= Seliše =

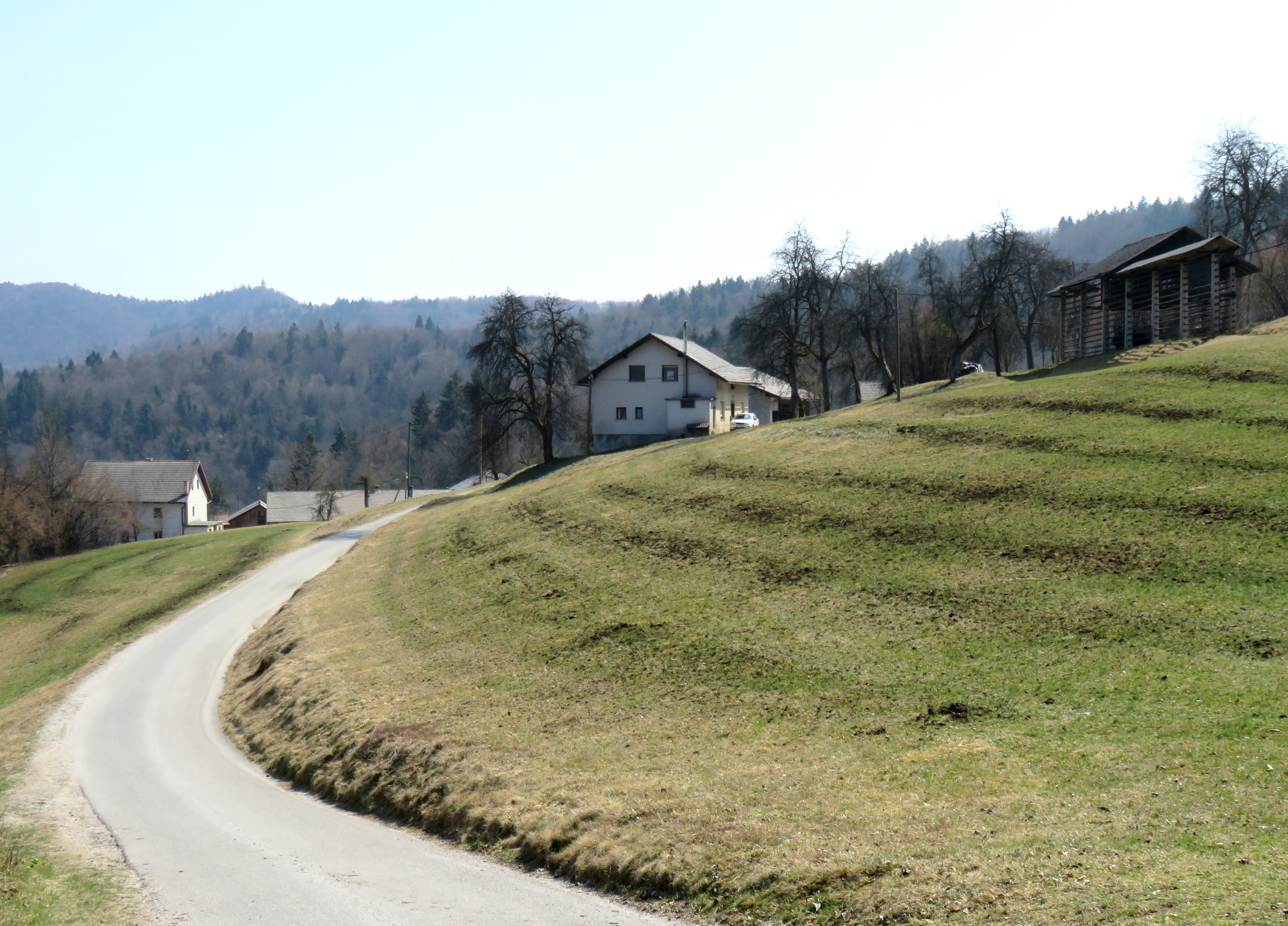

- Location in Slovenia
- Coordinates: 46°7′51″N 14°48′52″E
- Country: Slovenia
- Traditional region: Upper Carniola
- Statistical region: Central Slovenia
- Municipality: Moravče
- Elevation: 512 m (1,680 ft)

Seliše (Slovene pronunciation: [sɛˈliːʃɛ], sometimes Selišče) is a former settlement in the Municipality of Moravče in central Slovenia. It is now part of the village of Gora pri Pečah. The area is part of the traditional region of Upper Carniola. The municipality is now included in the Central Slovenia Statistical Region.

== Geography ==
Seliše lies in the southeastern part of Gora pri Pečah, on the north slope of Slivna Hill (elevation: 474 meters or 1,555 feet).

== History ==
Seliše had a population of 23 living in four houses in 1900. Seliše was annexed by Gora pri Pečah (at that time still called Gora svetega Florjana) in 1952, ending its existence as an independent settlement.
