= Log, Moravče =

Log
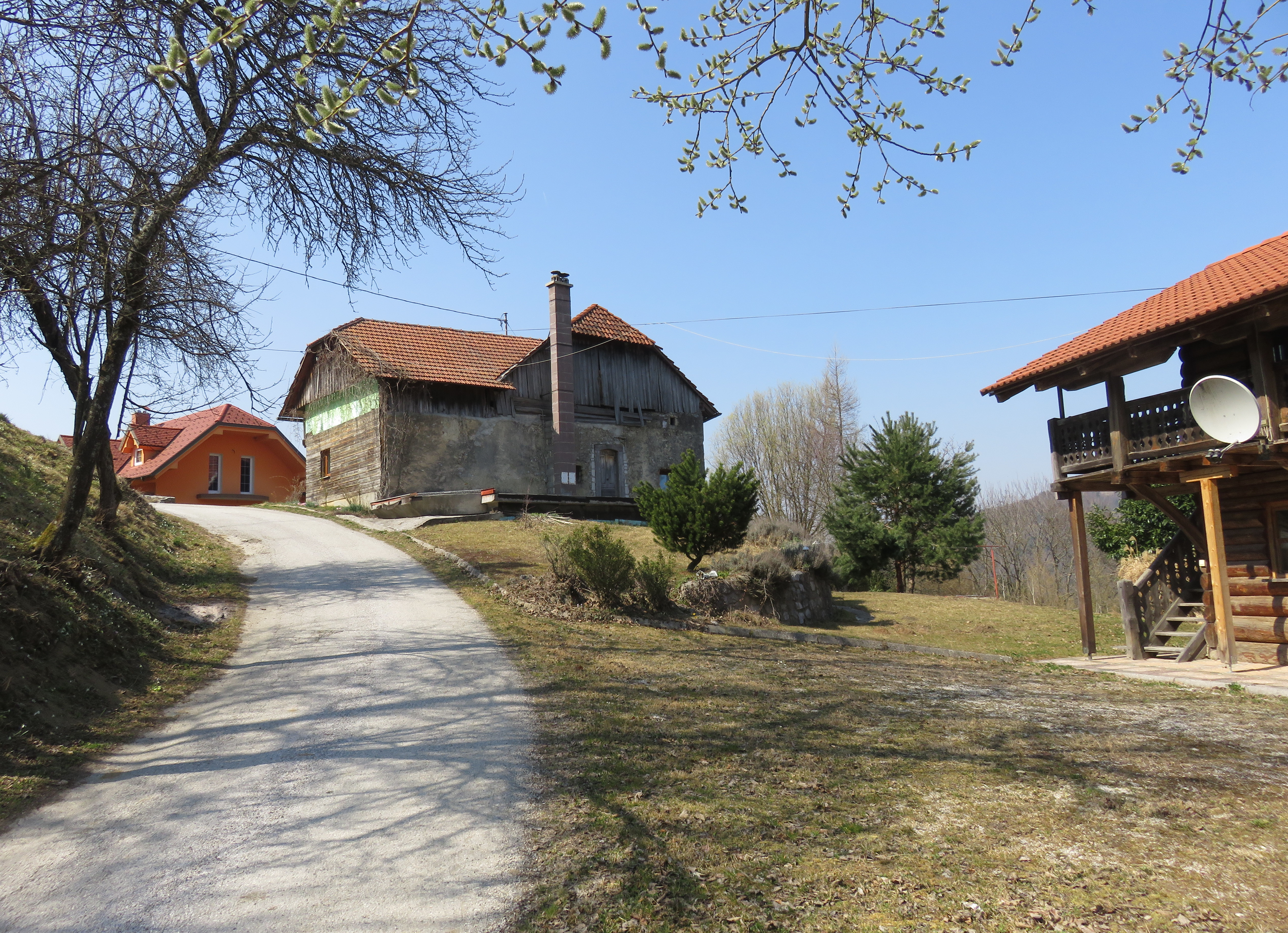

- Location in Slovenia
- Coordinates: 46°8′9″N 14°47′40″E
- Country: Slovenia
- Traditional region: Upper Carniola
- Statistical region: Central Slovenia
- Municipality: Moravče
- Elevation: 474 m (1,555 ft)

Log (Slovene pronunciation: [ˈloːk]) is a former settlement in the Municipality of Moravče in central Slovenia. It is now part of the village of Gora pri Pečah. The area is part of the traditional region of Upper Carniola. The municipality is now included in the Central Slovenia Statistical Region.

== Geography ==
Log lies in the northwestern part of Gora pri Pečah, on the north slope of Slivna Hill (elevation: 474 meters or 1,555 feet).

== History ==
Log had a population of 19 living in three houses in 1900. Log was annexed by Gora pri Pečah (at that time still called Gora svetega Florjana) in 1952, ending its existence as an independent settlement.
