= Veliko Nabrđe =

- Village
- Location within Croatia
- Coordinates: 45°24′N 18°11′E
- Country: Croatia

Population (2011)
  - Total: 0
- Time zone: UTC+1 (CET)
  - Summer (DST): UTC+2 (CEST)

Veliko Nabrđe is an uninhabited settlement in Croatia.

== Name ==
The village of Veliko Nabrđe was first mentioned in 1422 as possesio et districtus Naburgia, part of the Nevna (now Levanjska Varoš) fief. Further mentions are in 1428 as Naborgya, 1467 as Nabergye and Naberge and 1474 as Nabergye.

After the reconquest of the village from the Ottoman Empire at the end of the 17th century, the area was settled by Orthodox Vlachs from eastern Bosnia. In 1702, the population of Nabrđe was 19 settled families, of which 15 Orthodox and 4 Catholic. In the 18th century, its population grew to about 50 houses with 300 people. The number of Orthodox households grew notably in the 18th and 19th centuries. At the beginning of the 19th century, about 20 Catholic, Croatian families settled in Nabrđe. Because of constant quarrels with their Orthodox, Serb neighbours, about 20 families of Nabrđe left southward in the middle of the 19th century to form Malo Nabrđe, following which Nabrđe became Veliko Nabrđe.

== History ==
The mass expulsions of Serbs in Veliko Nabrđe began at the beginning of August 1942. All Serbs had to leave their homes, take no more than food for 7 days and drive their livestock to a gathering point. During the night, the villages were surrounded by strong Ustaša and Domobran forces. Once they were rounded up, a 4–5 kilometres (2.5–3.1 mi) long column of over 2200 Serbs was driven to Đakovo. In Đakovo, their belongings were confiscated at the fair grounds. Men were separated from the women and children and transported by livestock wagons to the Jasenovac concentration camp, while women and children were transported to the Stara Gradiška concentration camp, where mothers were separated from their children, who were transferred to a reception point in Zagreb.

Some of the WWII victims sometimes listed under Malo Nabrđe may have been residents of Veliko Nabrđe:

- Milorad (Rade) Stojaković (1937/1930, Veliko/Malo Nabrđe – Jasenovac, 1942), Serb, civilian, died in concentration camp
- Ljuba (Tešo) Radosavljević (1869/1870, Veliko/Malo Nabrđe or Majar – Stara Gradiška, 1942), Serb, civilian, died in concentration camp
- Milovan (Savo) Petrović (1905/1903/1913, Veliko Nabrđe – Jasenovac, 1944/1942), Serb civilian who died in concentration camp or Serb Partisan killed in action

== Demographics ==
As a mostly Serb village, its population declined from 1931 to 1948 much more drastically than the neighbouring mostly Croat Village of Malo Nabrđe, falling from 920 to 413.

In 1964, it was erased from the registry of settlements (Serbo-Croatian: imenik naselja).

Village of Malo Nabrđe: Population trends 1857–2021
v

population	578	658	543	614	661	792	715	920	413	428	456
	1857	1869	1880	1890	1900	1910	1921	1931	1948	1953	1961	1971	1981	1991	2001	2011	2021

Sources: Croatian Bureau of Statistics publications

== Religion ==
Veliko Nabrđe had an Orthodox church with parish.

== Governance ==
Administratively, Malo and Veliko Nabrđe belonged to Gašinci, and together they encompassed 5660 morgens, of which 52.6% forest, 30.9% field.

== Infrastructure ==
Veliko Nabrđe had its own Volksschule.

== Bibliography ==
- Geiger, Vladimir; Šola, Pero (2017-10-31). "Žrtvoslov Malog Nabrđa – Drugi svjetski rat i poraće: pokušaj revizije podataka o ljudskim gubitcima nestalog i zaboravljenog slavonskog sela" [The List of Victims of Malo Nabrđe – World War II and the Post-War Period: An Attempt of Data Revision on Human Losses in a Vanished and Forgotten Slavonian Village]. Scrinia Slavonica: Godišnjak Podružnice za povijest Slavonije, Srijema i Baranje Hrvatskog instituta za povijest (in Serbo-Croatian). 17: 291–378. eISSN 1848-9109.
