= Miholjački Karlovac =

- Village
- Location within Croatia
- Coordinates: 45°41′N 18°05′E
- Country: Croatia

Population (2011)
  - Total: 0
- Time zone: UTC+1 (CET)
  - Summer (DST): UTC+2 (CEST)

Miholjački Karlovac is a former village in Croatia. It was located west of Krunoslavje and south of Viljevo. It was settled after WWI by veterans of the First Serbian Volunteer Division, emptied of Serbs and resettled with Croats during WWII, following which the Serbs returned. It was last recorded as inhabited in the 1971 census.

== Name ==
The adjective Miholjački was added to the name of the village, Karlovac, to distinguish it from other settlements of that name, including Karlovac Banatski, Karlovac Feričanački, Karlovac Glamočki and Karlovac Gornji.

== History ==
Miholjački Karlovac was settled in 1922/1923 by Macedonian front veterans of the First Serbian Volunteer Division on land seized from exiled nobility.

On 14 June 1941, Ustaše and to-them-unknown gendarmes entered Krunoslavje and Karlovac together with the Croatian Armed Forces via Donji Miholjac by train, about 150 in all, led by a captain of the Home Guard. They split up into groups of 2 and told all Serbs to leave their homes within 5 minutes. They then herded them to the trains station and transported them in freight cars to Belišće, and from there to Serbia. There are testimonies that they were not allowed to take anything with them, even water for their children. Belongings in their houses or on their person were stolen. Their houses were then settled with 53 Croats belonging to 9 families from Zagorje. Archival documentation on the forced expulsion from Krunosavje and Karlovac is kept at the Croatian State Archives. (Note: HR-ZaHDA 306, ZKRZ, kutija 145, GUZ 2027.)

After the return of the Serbs in 1945 following the end of WWII, the Croats who had been settled in these houses were moved to Golinci, Marijanci and Šljivoševci. In 1948, the villagers were forced into zadruge during the Communist collectivization, but upon the death of Stalin in 1953, the land was returned to their ownership. In the late 1950s and early 1960s, new inhabitants arrived in Karlovac, Krunosavje and Cret Viljevski from Lika. In 1964, they began planting tobacco as a cash crop.

== Demographics ==
Village of Miholjački Karlovac: Population trends 1857–2021
v

population				8	51	64	43		78	84	75
	1857	1869	1880	1890	1900	1910	1921	1931	1948	1953	1961	1971	1981	1991	2001	2011	2021

Note:Part of Krunoslavje from 1890 to 1961, counted separately as Miholjački Karlovac in 1971 then under Krunosavje from 1981 on. Sources: Croatian Bureau of Statistics publications

== Bibliography ==
- Škiljan, Filip; Volner, Hrvoje (2023-12-12). "Identitet i sjećanje - Srbi u donjomiholjačkom kraju" [Identity and Memory - Serbs in the area of Donji Miholjac]. Tragovi: časopis za srpske i hrvatske teme (in Serbo-Croatian). 6 (2): 52–86. doi:10.52328/t.6.2.2. eISSN 2718-3467.
- Frančić, Anđela (2021-12-07). "Ime Martin u hrvatskoj ojkonimiji". Croatica et Slavica Iadertina. 17 (1): 157–181. eISSN 1849-0131.
