= Following of Ante Pavlović =

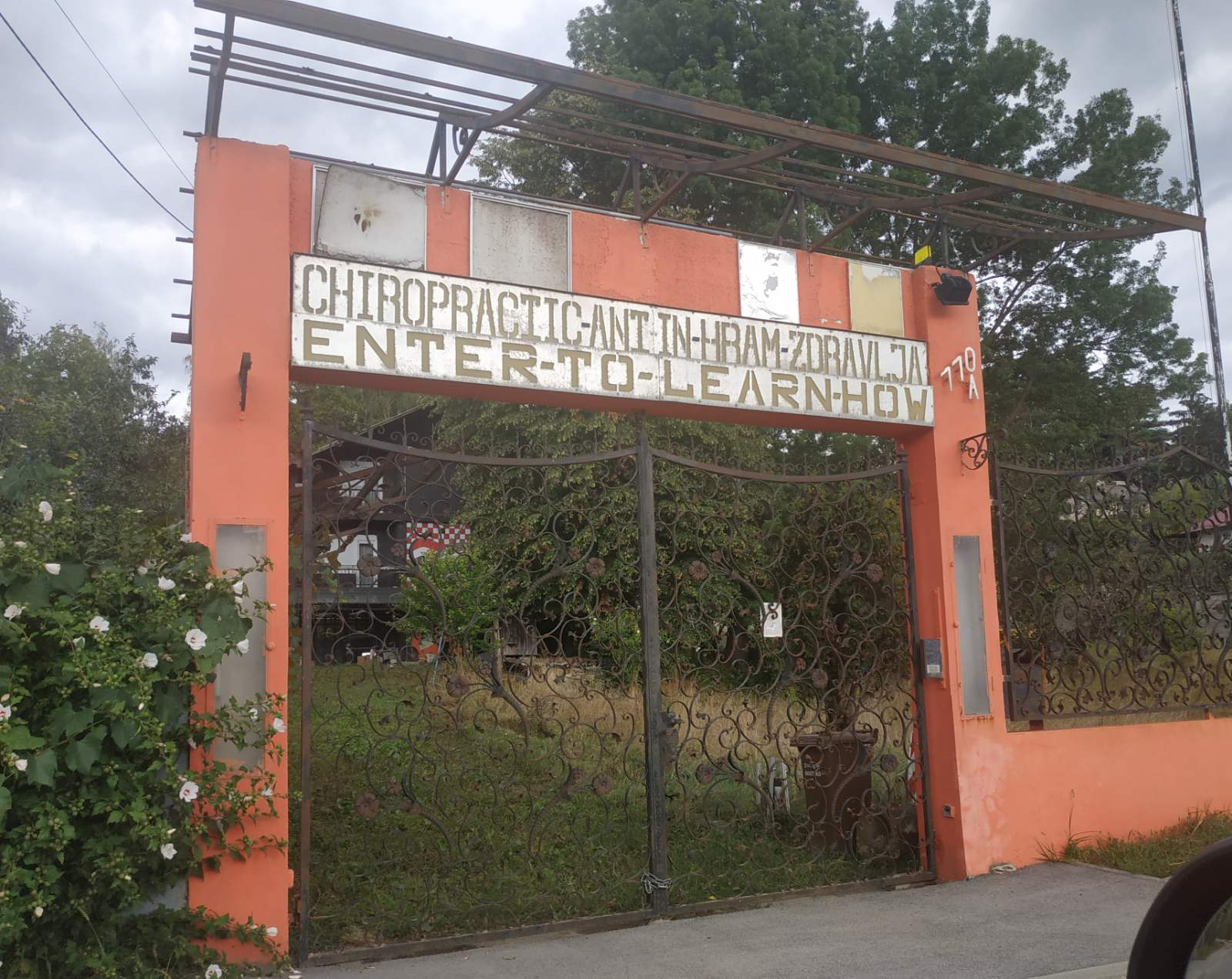
Entrance to Ante Pavlović's estate in Donji Dragonožec.

The following of Ante Pavlović was a Croatian following centered around controversial charismatic Croatian self-proclaimed chiropractor Ante Pavlović.

== The following ==
During the 1990s, Pavlović gained popularity in war-torn Croatia, as he was apparently healing his followers by taking them for a dip in Novo Čiče lake during the winter storm. Among hundreds of his followers were also parents with their toddlers. His apparent method of healing was called "the centring" (centriranje). He subsequently opened Ante's Temple of Health (Antin Hram Zdravlja) in Donji Dragonožec, Croatia, where his followers would come for healing. Until his death in July 2020, Pavlović kept his YouTube channel active, where he would film his everyday life. His YouTube account had some 20,700 subscribers. Croatian media reported that his YouTube channel continued to be active even after his death.

== Personality ==
Pavlović was born in 1957 near Prijedor, Bosnia and Herzegovina. He attended Francisian Classic Gymnasium in Visoko and subsequently studied theology, but never actually became a priest. As Croatian daily Večernji list wrote, prior to the 1990s Pavlović lived for some time in Switzerland and the US, where he ended up in mental institutions. Pavlović came to Croatia somewhere around late 1980s or early 1990s. He apparently returned to Croatia from USA with chiropractic degrees. He gained attention by dressing in black robes and portraying himself as being martial arts expert. He took part in Croatian War of Independence. He himself often claimed to be a former member of Croatian elite counter-terrorist unit ATJ Lučko, but unit's members publicly refuted these claims, even saying that Pavlović embarrasses them. Večernji list wrote that Pavlović was member of 175th Zagreb Infantry Brigade (made up mostly of deserters and refugees from Herzeg-Bosnia and deployed to the Prozor-Rama front) for one week.

In later stages of his life, Pavlović claimed that he was a reincarnation of Jesus Christ, about to become a president of Croatia and he even pasted around public posters advertising his presidential candidacy. Pavlović told Nova TV's journalists coming to inspect complaints sent by Pavlović's neighbours, that upon getting elected as president: "he will personally kill: Manolić, Mesić, Kolinda and Ante and Ivo Josipović". However, since he in the meantime got arrested, he claimed that "the partisans", or "the reds" were undermining his political efforts. He also claimed that he regularly communicated with Sai Baba from India, who gave him money. After Pavlović's arrest in 2019, police and veterinarians raided his estate and found a number of dead animal remains and other malnutritioned animals roaming around the estate. At the end of his life, Pavlović got diabetes, which resulted in his toes getting amputated. Nonetheless, he refused to take conventional therapy. As his health was deteriorating, he decided to go on a trip to Sinj by walking, but fell ill as he reached Gospić. He was taken to the hospital in Zagreb where he died aged 63.

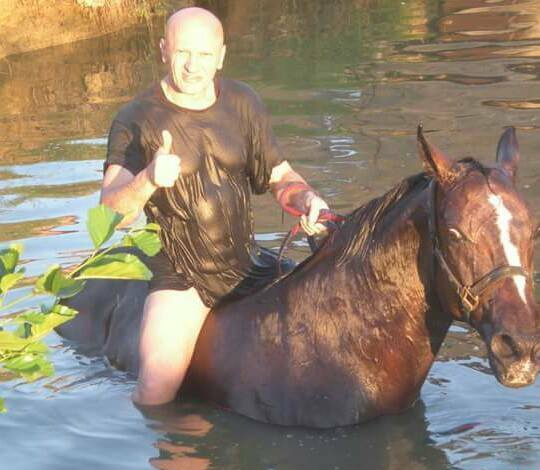
Pavlović on his horse.
