= Karlovci =

Karlovci can refer to:

- Sremski Karlovci, a town and municipality in Srem, Vojvodina, Serbia
- Novi Karlovci, a village in Srem, Vojvodina, Serbia

== See also ==
- Karlovac (disambiguation)
