= Poljane, Moravče =

Poljane
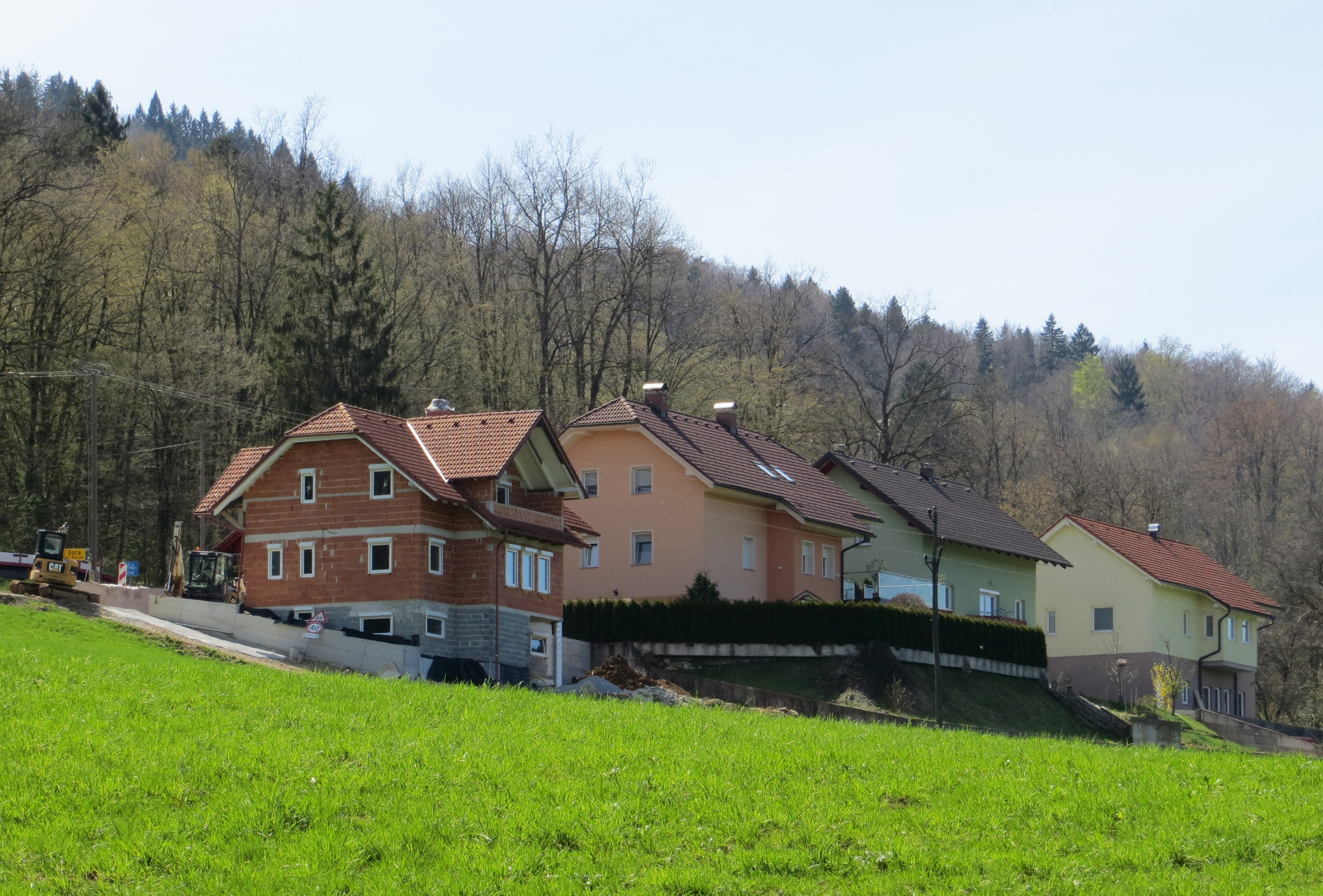

- Location in Slovenia
- Coordinates: 46°8′9″N 14°48′38″E
- Country: Slovenia
- Traditional region: Upper Carniola
- Statistical region: Central Slovenia
- Municipality: Moravče
- Elevation: 442 m (1,450 ft)

Poljane (Slovene pronunciation: [pɔˈljaːnɛ]) is a former settlement in the Municipality of Moravče in central Slovenia. It is now part of the village of Gora pri Pečah. The area is part of the traditional region of Upper Carniola. The municipality is now included in the Central Slovenia Statistical Region.

== Geography ==
Poljane lies in the northeastern part of Gora pri Pečah, above the main road from Moravče to Mlinše.

== History ==
Poljane had a population of 11 living in three houses in 1900. Poljane was annexed by Gora pri Pečah (at that time still called Gora svetega Florjana) in 1952, ending its existence as an independent settlement.
