= Breznica Đakovačka =

- Village (Selo)
- Location within Croatia
- Coordinates: 45.330112°N 18.163885°E
- Country: Croatia
- County: Osijek-Baranja County
- Municipality: Levanjska Varoš

Area
  - Total: 10.1 km^{2} (3.9 sq mi)

Population (2021)
  - Total: 175
  - Density: 17.3/km^{2} (44.9/sq mi)
- Time zone: UTC+1 (CET)
  - Summer (DST): UTC+2 (CEST)

Breznica Đakovačka is a village in Croatia.
