= Cernička Mala =

- Village
- Location within Croatia
- Coordinates: 45°16′N 17°22′E
- Country: Croatia

Population (2011)
  - Total: 0
- Time zone: UTC+1 (CET)
  - Summer (DST): UTC+2 (CEST)

Cernička Mala is an uninhabited settlement in Croatia.

== See also ==
- List of former populated places in Croatia
