= Satnica Đakovačka =

- Municipality
- Location of Satnica Đakovačka in Croatia
- Coordinates: 45°22′N 18°23′E
- Country: Croatia
- Region: Slavonia
- County: Osijek-Baranja County

Area
  - Municipality: 77.0 km^{2} (29.7 sq mi)
  - Urban: 23.1 km^{2} (8.9 sq mi)

Population (2021)
  - Municipality: 1,775
  - Density: 23.1/km^{2} (59.7/sq mi)
  - Urban: 1,223
  - Urban density: 52.9/km^{2} (137/sq mi)
- Website: satnica-djakovacka.hr

Satnica Đakovačka (Hungarian: Szatnica) is a village and a municipality in Osijek-Baranja County, in eastern Croatia.

In the 2011 census, there were a total of 2,123 inhabitants, in the following settlements:

- Gašinci, population 691
- Satnica Đakovačka, population 1,432

In the same census, 99% of the population were Croats.
