= Stanić, Cres =

Village in Primorje-Gorski Kotar, Croatia

Stanić Stanici
- Ghost village
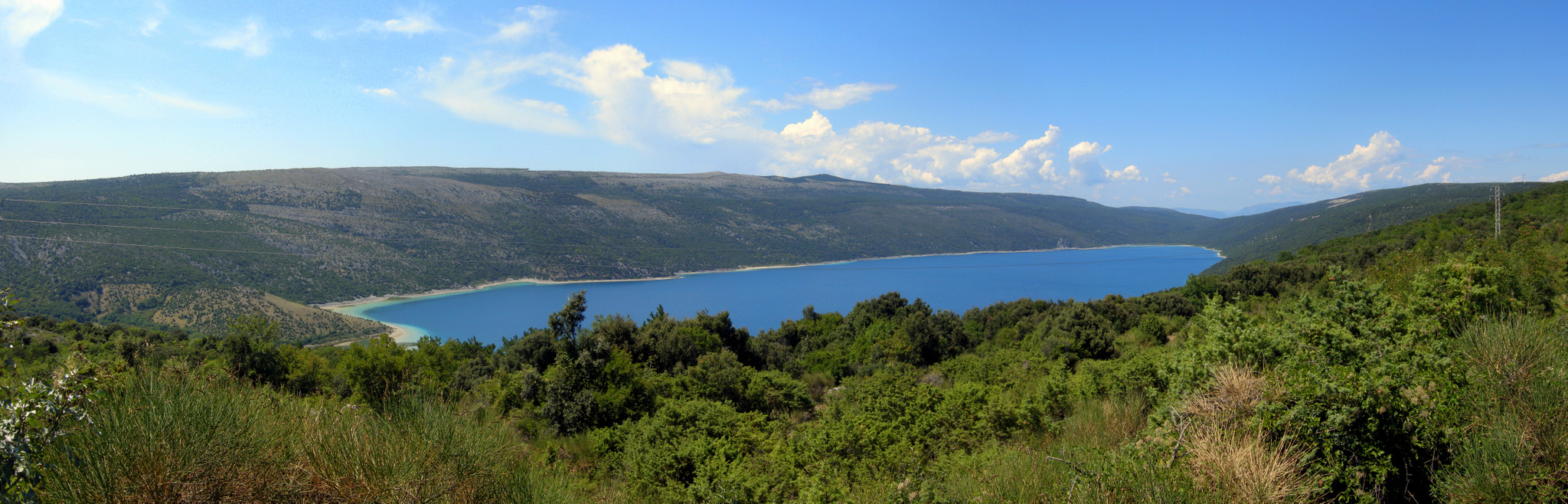
- View from Stanić on Lake Vrana

- Location within Croatia
- Coordinates: 44.84142°N 14.40758°E
- Country: Croatia
- County: Primorje-Gorski Kotar
- Town: Cres

Area
  - Total: 3.8 km^{2} (1.5 sq mi)

Population (2021)
  - Total: 0
  - Density: 0.0/km^{2} (0.0/sq mi)
- Time zone: UTC+1 (CET)
  - Summer (DST): UTC+2 (CEST)
- Postal code: 51557
- Area code: 051
- Vehicle registration: RI

Stanić (Italian: Stanici) is a ghost village on the Croatian island of Cres, in Primorje-Gorski Kotar. Administratively, it is part of the town of Cres. As of 2021, it had a population of 0. It is located southeast of Lake Vrana. The village once had a population of 67, in 1910, but the latest year in which the census recorded a population in Stanić is 1991, with 2 inhabitants.

== See also ==
- List of former populated places in Croatia
