= Važminec =

Ghost village in Primorje-Gorski Kotar, Croatia

Važminec Važminež Vasminezzo
- Ghost village
- Location within Croatia
- Coordinates: 45.13692°N 14.34234°E
- Country: Croatia
- County: Primorje-Gorski Kotar
- Town: Cres

Area
  - Total: 13.6 km^{2} (5.3 sq mi)

Population (2021)
  - Total: 0
  - Density: 0.0/km^{2} (0.0/sq mi)
- Time zone: UTC+1 (CET)
  - Summer (DST): UTC+2 (CEST)
- Postal code: 51559
- Area code: 051
- Vehicle registration: RI

Važminec or Važminež (Italian: Vasminezzo) is a ghost village located on the Croatian island of Cres, in Primorje-Gorski Kotar. Administratively, it is part of the town of Cres. The village once had a population of 85, in 1880, but the latest year in which the census recorded a population in Važminec is 1991, with 8 inhabitants. In 2021, it had 0 inhabitants.

== See also ==
- List of former populated places in Croatia
