= Čaklovac =

- Čaklovec
- Croatia

Site information
- Owner: Public
- Open to the public: Yes
- Condition: Ruins

Location
- Coordinates: 45.4531°N 17.2847°E

Site history
- Built: 13th century

Čaklovac (also known as Čaklovec) is a historical fortress located in Croatia. It is situated on the northern slopes of Psunj, near the village of Dragović. The fortress played a significant defensive role due to its strategic position near a road connecting Pakrac to Požega via Kamengrad.

== History ==
Čaklovac is believed to have been constructed in the 13th century and was likely associated with the Knights Hospitaller of the Vrana priory. Historical records from the 15th century refer to it as Csáktornya. Over time, the name evolved to Čakovec, similar to the Croatian town of Čakovec, before settling on its current name, Čaklovac.

Administratively, Čaklovac was part of Križevci County and served as its easternmost defensive point. It marked the easternmost reach of the Kajkavian dialect in this region of Croatia. In the early 16th century, ownership of the fortress changed hands, first to Ban Petar Keglević and later to Franjo Tahy. By the mid-16th century, it fell under Ottoman control.

Under Ottoman rule, Čaklovac lost its economic importance and remained primarily a military site. It gained notoriety for housing notorious Ottoman officials, including one who was killed by the local Croatian outlaw Franjo Ilinić. After the Ottomans left in the 17th century, the fortress gradually declined in significance and fell into ruin.

== Architecture ==
The fortress of Čaklovac is not entirely preserved. The main tower, which had five corners and stood five stories high, is partially intact. Inside, remnants of Gothic interior elements can still be seen. The main tower also served as the residential area.

Additional defensive structures, such as moats, defensive walls, and trenches, have survived. Southeast of the fortress lies a deep moat reinforced by a strong wall, designed to protect against approaches from the southeast, where the terrain is more accessible. The pointed end of the main tower faces this direction for added defense.

== Location ==
Čaklovac is located on a steep hill on the northern slopes of Psunj. The nearby village of Dragović is situated close to the fortress, and a road to the north connects Pakrac to Požega via Kamengrad, highlighting the strategic importance of the location.

== See also ==
- List of castles in Croatia
- History of Croatia
