= Donji Dragonožec =

- Village
- Location within Croatia
- Coordinates: 45°39′43″N 15°56′49″E
- Country: Croatia
- County: City of Zagreb
- City District: Brezovica

Area
  - Total: 1.3 sq mi (3.3 km^{2})
- Elevation: 469 ft (143 m)

Population (2021)
  - Total: 583
  - Density: 460/sq mi (180/km^{2})
- Time zone: UTC+1 (CET)
  - Summer (DST): UTC+2 (CEST)

Donji Dragonožec is a village in Croatia. It is formally a settlement (naselje) of Zagreb, the capital of Croatia.

== Demographics ==
According to the 2021 census, its population was 583. According to the 2011 census, it had 577 inhabitants.

== Notable residents ==
- Ante Pavlović
