= Kmeti =

Kmeti Metti
- Village
- Location within Croatia
- Coordinates: 45°26′56″N 13°34′26″E
- Country: Croatia
- County: Istria County
- Municipality: Umag

Area
  - Total: 1.0 sq mi (2.7 km^{2})

Population (2021)
  - Total: 300
  - Density: 290/sq mi (110/km^{2})
- Time zone: UTC+1 (CET)
  - Summer (DST): UTC+2 (CEST)
- Postal code: 52470 Umag
- Area code: 052

Kmeti (Italian: Metti) is a village in Umag municipality in Istria County, Croatia.

== Demographics ==
According to the 2021 census, its population was 300. It was 256 in 2001.
