= Sušobreg =

Coordinates: 46°02′06″N 16°09′50″E

- Village
- Interactive map of Sušobreg
- Country: Croatia
- County: Krapina-Zagorje County

Area
  - Total: 3.1 km^{2} (1.2 sq mi)

Population (2021)
  - Total: 194
  - Density: 63/km^{2} (160/sq mi)
- Time zone: UTC+1 (CET)
  - Summer (DST): UTC+2 (CEST)

Sušobreg is a village in Croatia.
