= Gornje Selo, Split-Dalmatia County =

Coordinates: 43°21′11″N 16°20′28″E

Gornje Selo
- Village
- Interactive map of Gornje Selo
- Country: Croatia

Area
  - Total: 5.6 sq mi (14.6 km^{2})

Population (2021)
  - Total: 262
  - Density: 46.5/sq mi (17.9/km^{2})
- Time zone: UTC+1 (CET)
  - Summer (DST): UTC+2 (CEST)

Gornje Selo is a village and a cadastral in Croatia on the island of Šolta in the Split-Dalmatia County. It is connected by the D111 highway. Gornje Selo village in the interior of the island largely without tourism. The population engaged in farming, or are fishermen or seamen. At the beginning of the town there is a modern olive oil mill.

== Image gallery ==
Gornje Selo

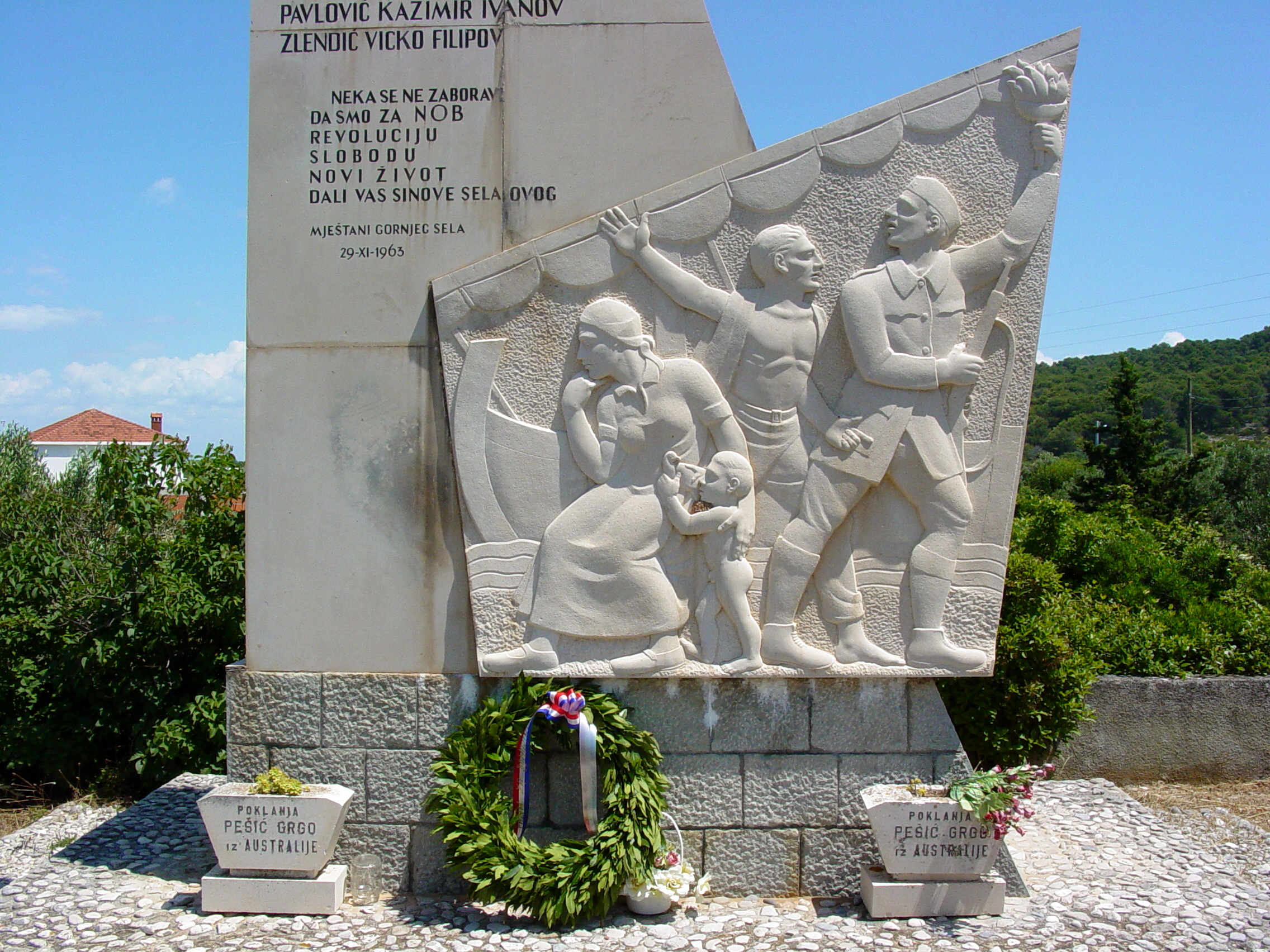
Monument to the World War II victims

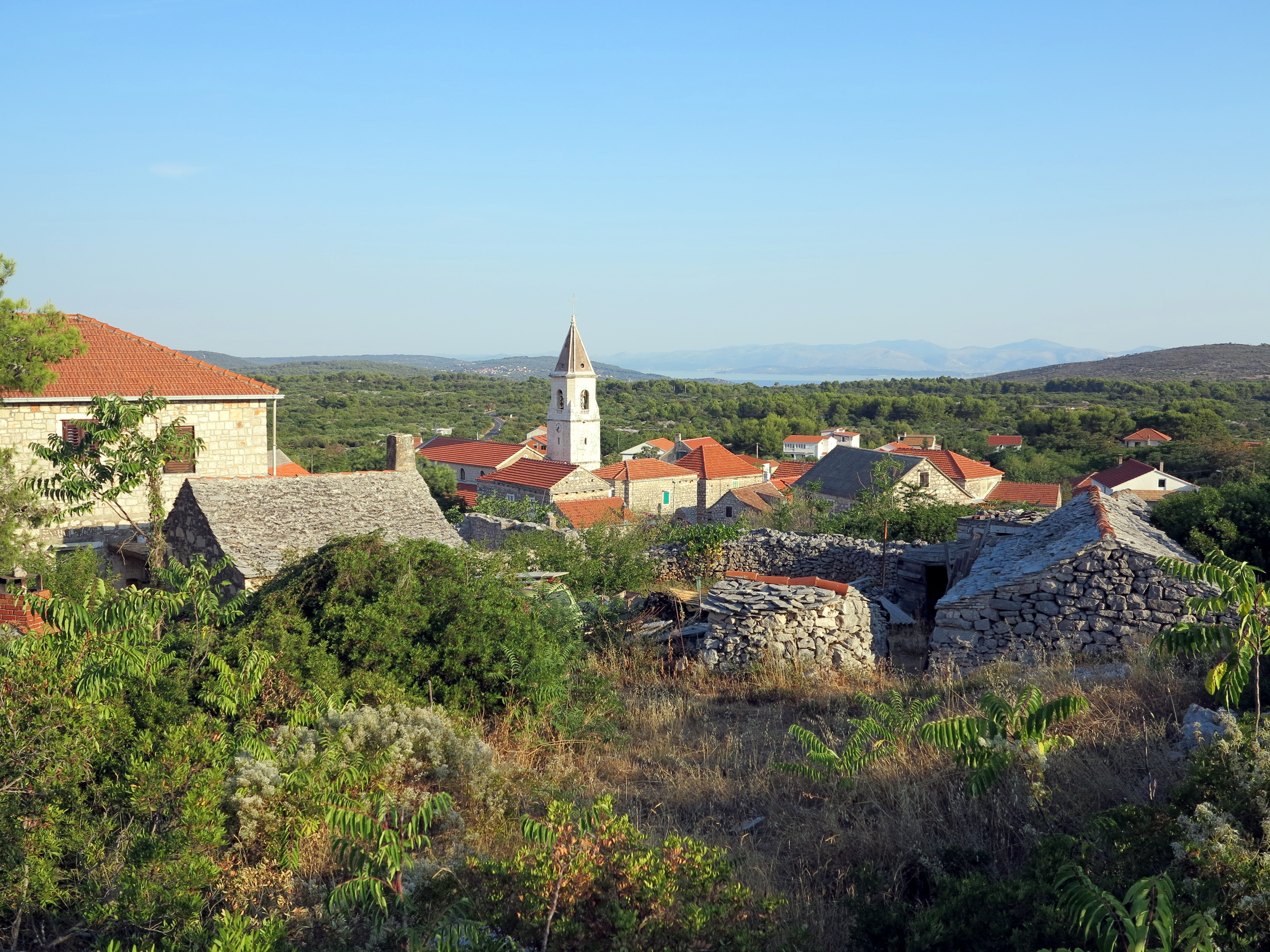
View to the northwest

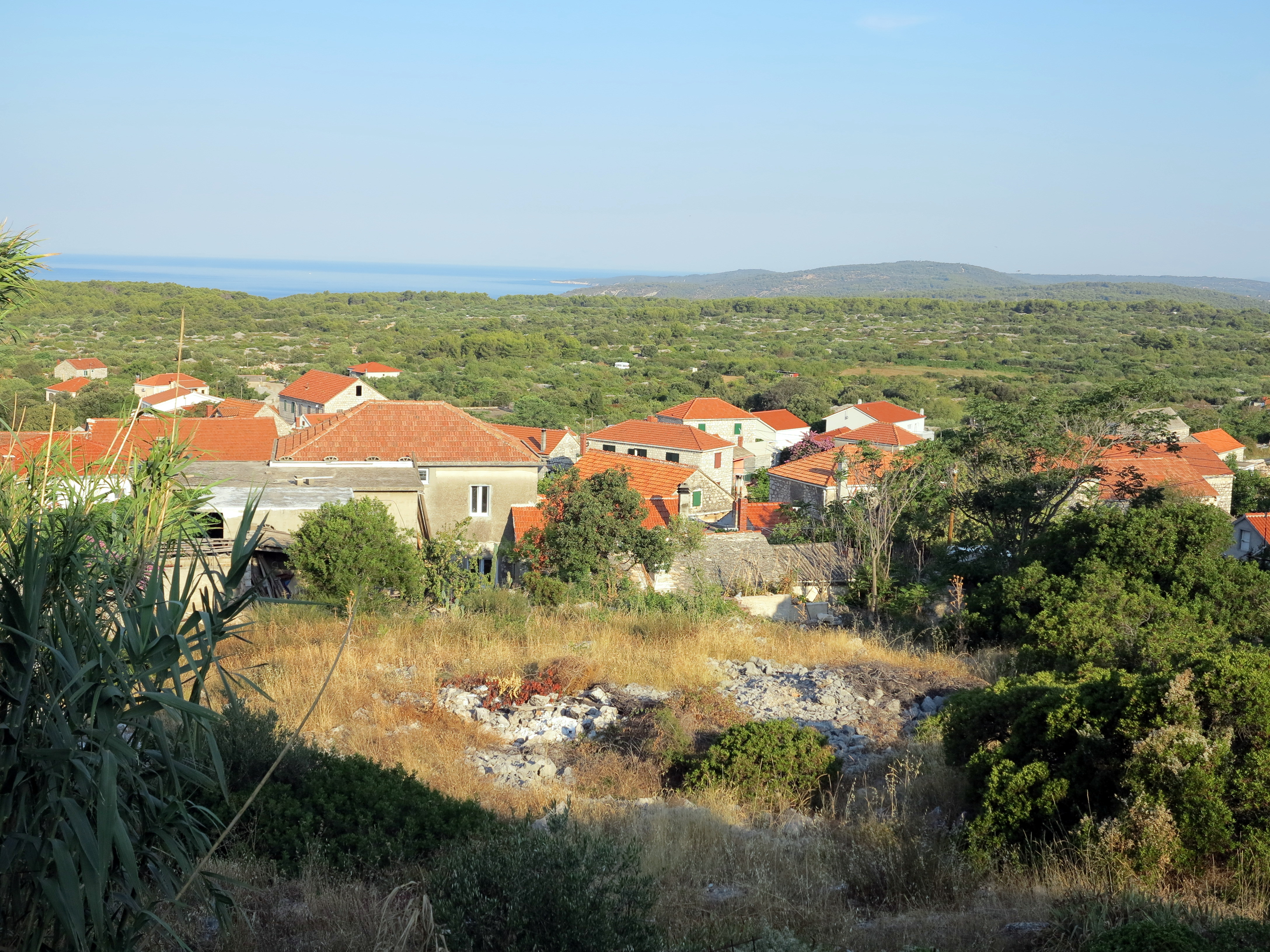
View to the south

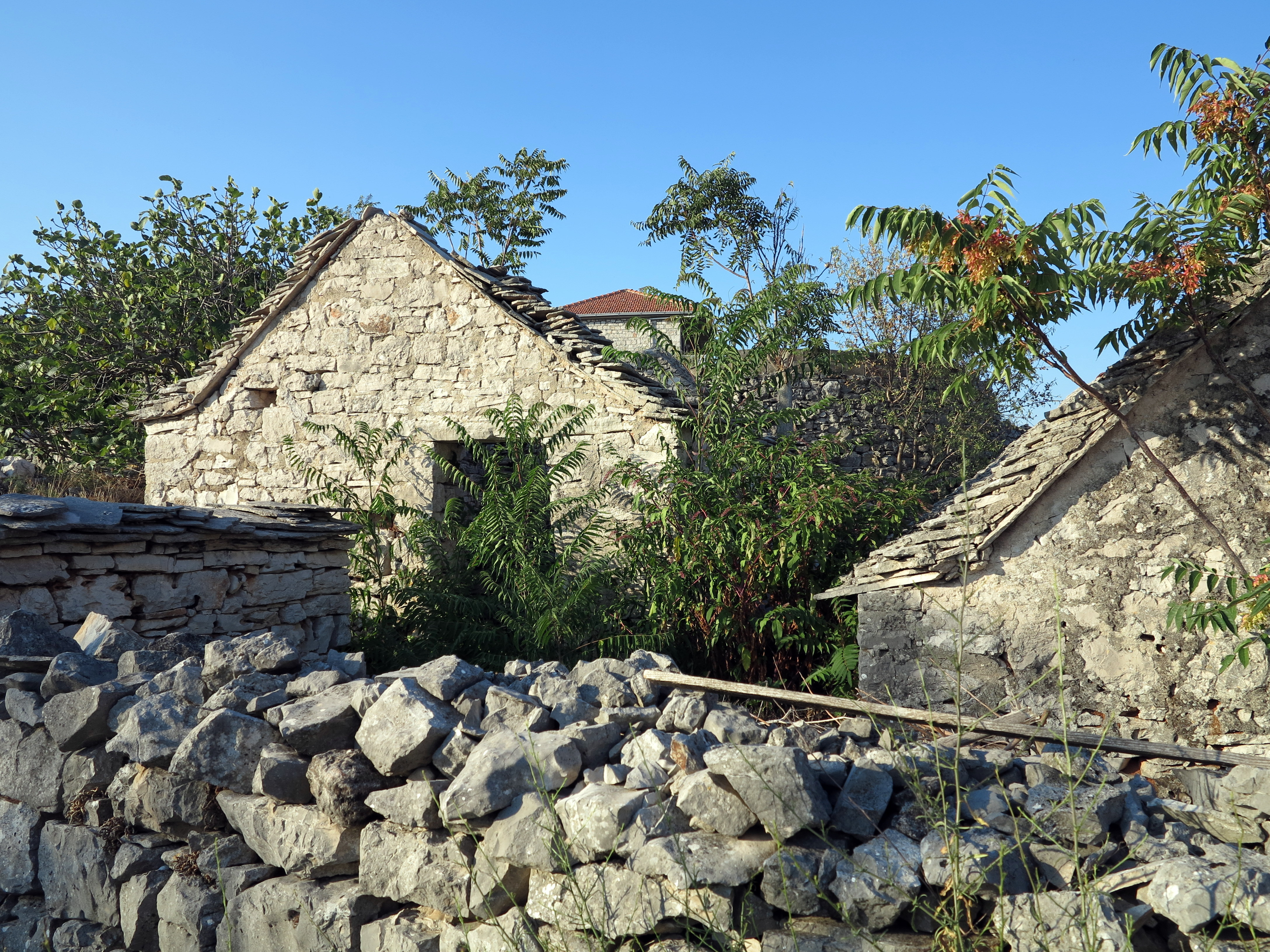
Dilapidated barns

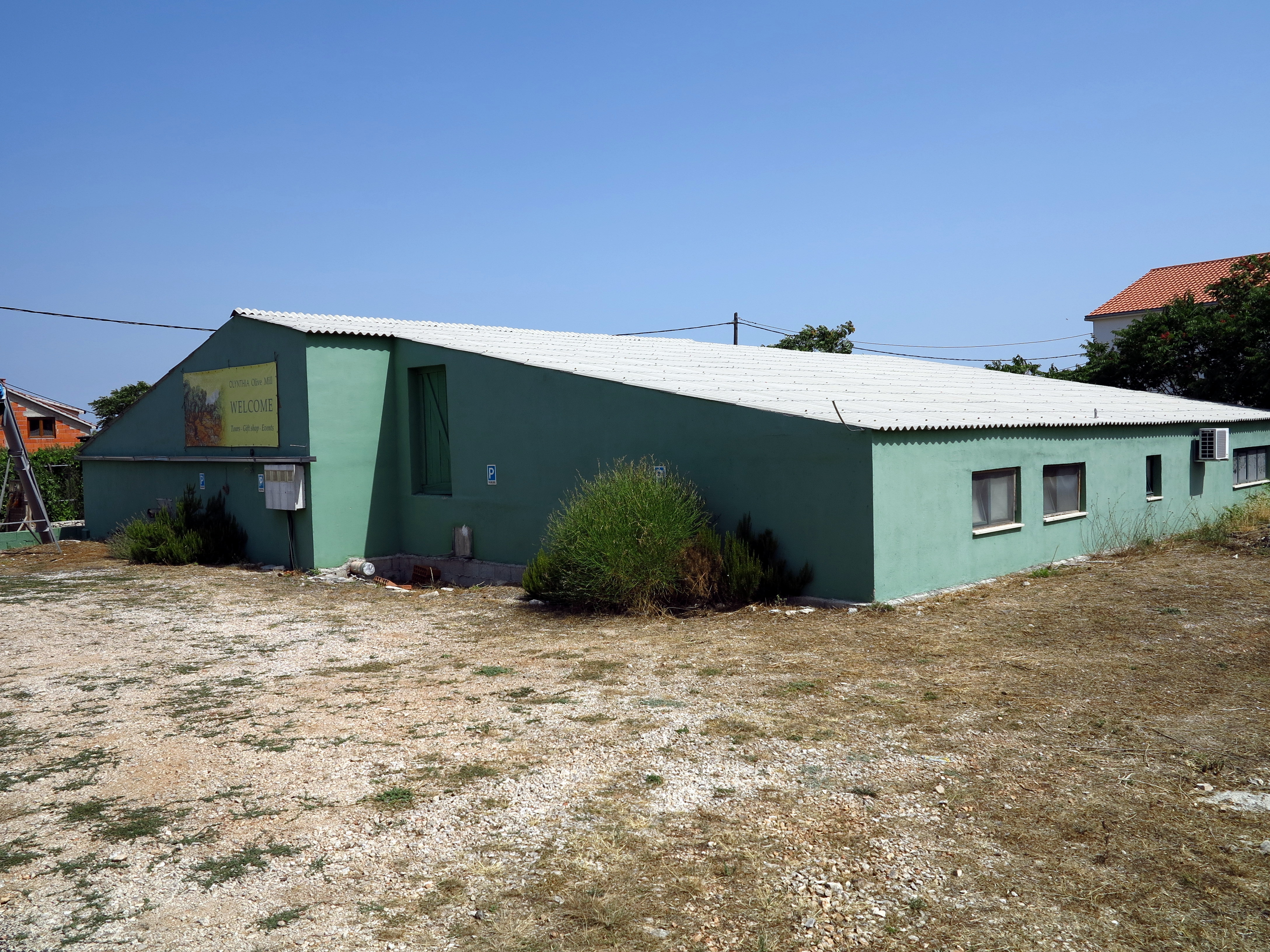
Modern olive oil mill
