= Musić, Croatia =

Settlement in Osijek-Baranja County, Croatia

Musić
- Settlement
- Interactive map of Musić
- Location of Musić in Croatia
- Coordinates: 45°17′20″N 18°10′01″E
- Country: Croatia
- County: Osijek-Baranja
- Municipality: Levanjska Varoš

Area
  - Total: 8.4 km^{2} (3.2 sq mi)

Population (2021)
  - Total: 54
  - Density: 6.4/km^{2} (17/sq mi)
- Time zone: UTC+1 (CET)
  - Summer (DST): UTC+2 (CEST)
- Postal code: 31400 Đakovo
- Area code: +385 (0)31

Musić is a settlement in the Municipality of Levanjska Varoš in Croatia. In 2021, its population was 54.

== Demographics ==
Musić: Population trends 1857–2021
v

population	247	309	239	290	292	349	493	433	301	309	274	205	150	102	104	75	54
	1857	1869	1880	1890	1900	1910	1921	1931	1948	1953	1961	1971	1981	1991	2001	2011	2021

Sources: Croatian Bureau of Statistics publications
