= Petruševec =

Petruševec may refer to:

- Petruševec, Krapina-Zagorje County, a village near Zlatar
- Petruševec, Zagreb, a neighborhood in the Peščenica - Žitnjak district
