= Baići =

- Village
- Location within Croatia
- Coordinates: 45°13′N 15°43′E
- Country: Croatia

Area
  - Total: 2.1 km^{2} (0.81 sq mi)

Population (2021)
  - Total: 3
  - Density: 1.4/km^{2} (3.7/sq mi)
- Time zone: UTC+1 (CET)
  - Summer (DST): UTC+2 (CEST)

Baići is largely an uninhabited settlement in Croatia.The area spans approximately 2.1 square kilometers. A census in 2021 recorded only three residents living in Baići.

Situated near the hamlet of Pavičići and the village of Griče. It shares postal services with the nearby city of Karlovac, which uses the postal code 47000.
