= Gerovski Kraj =

Coordinates: 45°30′N 14°39′E

- Village
- Interactive map of Gerovski Kraj
- Country: Croatia
- County: Primorje-Gorski Kotar County
- Municipality: Čabar

Area
  - Total: 30.1 km^{2} (11.6 sq mi)

Population (2021)
  - Total: 72
  - Density: 2.4/km^{2} (6.2/sq mi)
- Time zone: UTC+1 (CET)
  - Summer (DST): UTC+2 (CEST)

Gerovski Kraj is a village in western Croatia located in Primorje-Gorski Kotar County. It is connected by the D32 highway.

== Sports ==
Beginning in 2013, the 7 stage 260 kilometres (160 mi) long Cycling Trail of Gorski Kotar (Croatian: Goranska biciklistička transverzala) passes through Gerovski Kraj.
