= Orešnjak =

- Village
- Location within Croatia
- Coordinates: 45°46′N 17°56′E
- Country: Croatia

Population (2011)
  - Total: 0
- Time zone: UTC+1 (CET)
  - Summer (DST): UTC+2 (CEST)

Orešnjak is an uninhabited settlement in Croatia.
