= Levanjska Varoš =

- Municipality
- Flag Coat of arms
- Interactive map of Levanjska Varoš
- Location in Croatia Levanjska Varoš (Croatia)
- Coordinates: 45.31°N 18.18°E
- Country: Croatia
- Region: Slavonia
- County: Osijek-Baranja County

Government
  - Mayor: Slavko Tidlačka

Area
  - Municipality: 123.2 km^{2} (47.6 sq mi)
  - Urban: 10.6 km^{2} (4.1 sq mi)

Population (2021)
  - Municipality: 767
  - Density: 6.23/km^{2} (16.1/sq mi)
  - Urban: 216
  - Urban density: 20.4/km^{2} (52.8/sq mi)
- Time zone: UTC+1 (Central European Time)
- Website: opcina-levanjska-varos.hr

Levanjska Varoš (Hungarian: Névna, Serbian Cyrillic: Левањска Варош) is a municipality in Osijek-Baranja County, Croatia.

In the 2011 census, there were a total of 1,194 inhabitants, in the following settlements:

- Borojevci, no population
- Breznica Đakovačka, population 345
- Čenkovo, no population
- Levanjska Varoš, population 303
- Majar, population 148
- Milinac, population 28
- Musić, population 75
- Ovčara, population 23
- Paučje, population 55
- Ratkov Dol, population 28
- Slobodna Vlast, population 189

85.8% of whom are Croats and 12.8% of whom are Serbs.

== Politics ==
=== Minority councils ===
Directly elected minority councils and representatives are tasked with consulting the local or regional authorities, advocating for minority rights and interests, integration into public life and participation in the management of local affairs. At the 2023 Croatian national minorities councils and representatives elections Serbs of Croatia fulfilled legal requirements to elect 10 members municipal minority councils of the Levanjska Varoš Municipality but the elections were not held due to the lack of candidates.
