= Podgrič =

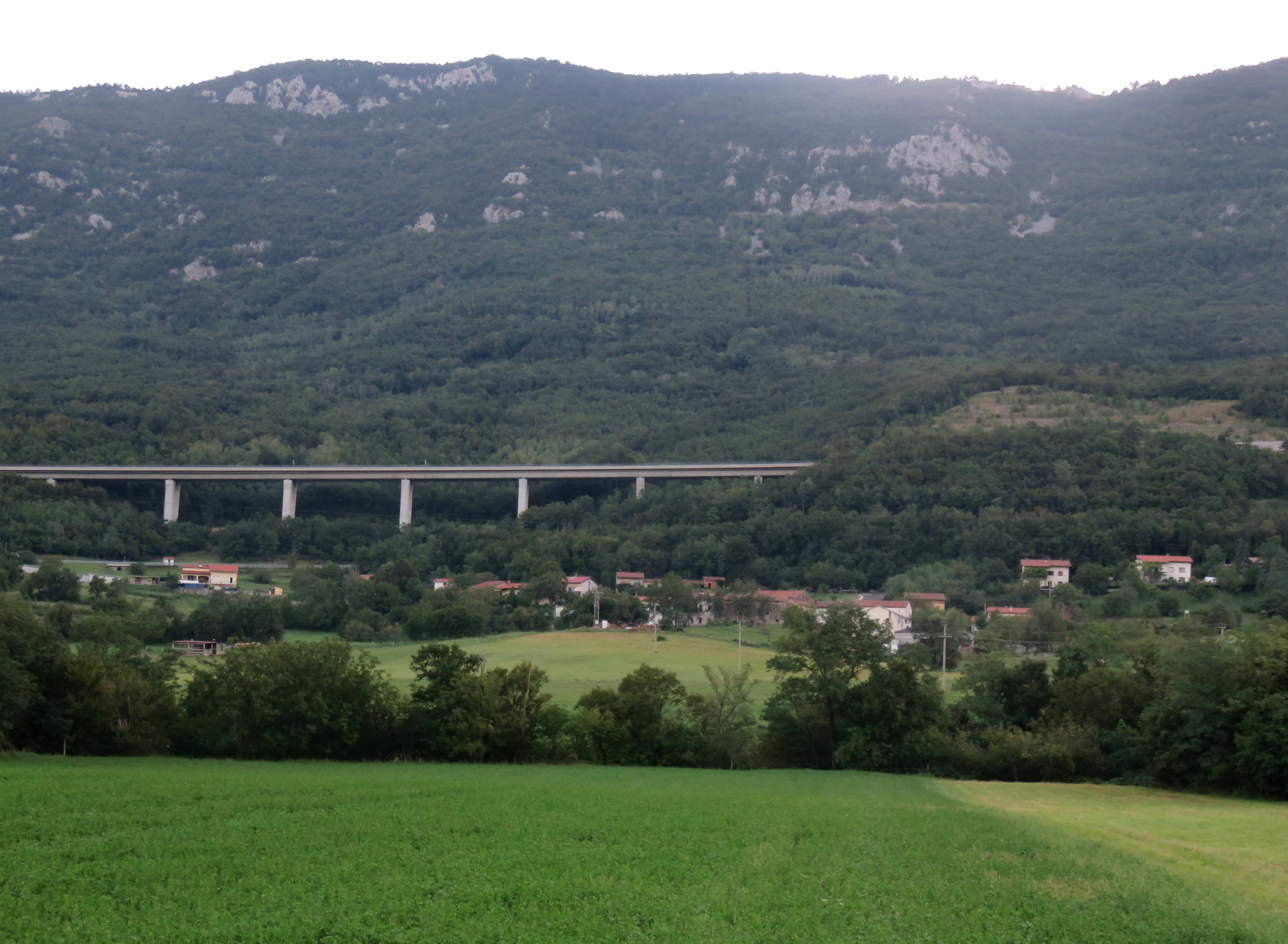

- Location in Slovenia
- Coordinates: 45°47′17.84″N 13°59′45.12″E
- Country: Slovenia
- Traditional region: Littoral
- Statistical region: Gorizia
- Municipality: Vipava

Area
  - Total: 2.06 km^{2} (0.80 sq mi)
- Elevation: 231 m (758 ft)

Population (2002)
  - Total: 53

Podgrič (pronounced [pɔdˈɡɾiːtʃ]) is a small village at the upper end of the Vipava Valley, below the southwest slopes of Mount Nanos, in the Municipality of Vipava in the Littoral region of Slovenia.
