= Gornji Tiškovac =

Gornji Tiškovac Горњи Тишковац
- Village
- Location within Bosnia and Herzegovina
- Coordinates: 44°15′57″N 16°12′00″E
- Country: Bosnia and Herzegovina
- Entity: Federation of Bosnia and Herzegovina
- Canton: Una-Sana
- Municipality: Bihać

Area
  - Total: 8.72 sq mi (22.59 km^{2})

Population (2013)
  - Total: 25
  - Density: 2.9/sq mi (1.1/km^{2})
- Time zone: UTC+1 (CET)
  - Summer (DST): UTC+2 (CEST)

Gornji Tiškovac (Serbian Cyrillic: Горњи Тишковац) is a village in the municipality of Bihać, Bosnia and Herzegovina.

== Demographics ==
According to the 2013 census, its population was 25, all Serbs.
