= Nugla =

- Village
- Location within Croatia
- Coordinates: 45.4157474°N 14.0053008°E
- Country: Croatia
- County: Istria
- Municipality: Buzet

Area
  - Total: 1.8 sq mi (4.6 km^{2})

Population (2021)
  - Total: 73
  - Density: 41/sq mi (16/km^{2})
- Time zone: UTC+1 (CET)
  - Summer (DST): UTC+2 (CEST)
- Postal code: 52420 Buzet
- Area code: 052

Nugla is a village in Istria, Croatia.

== Demographics ==
According to the 2021 census, its population was 73.
