= Bukovlje, Croatia =

Bukovlje
- Municipality
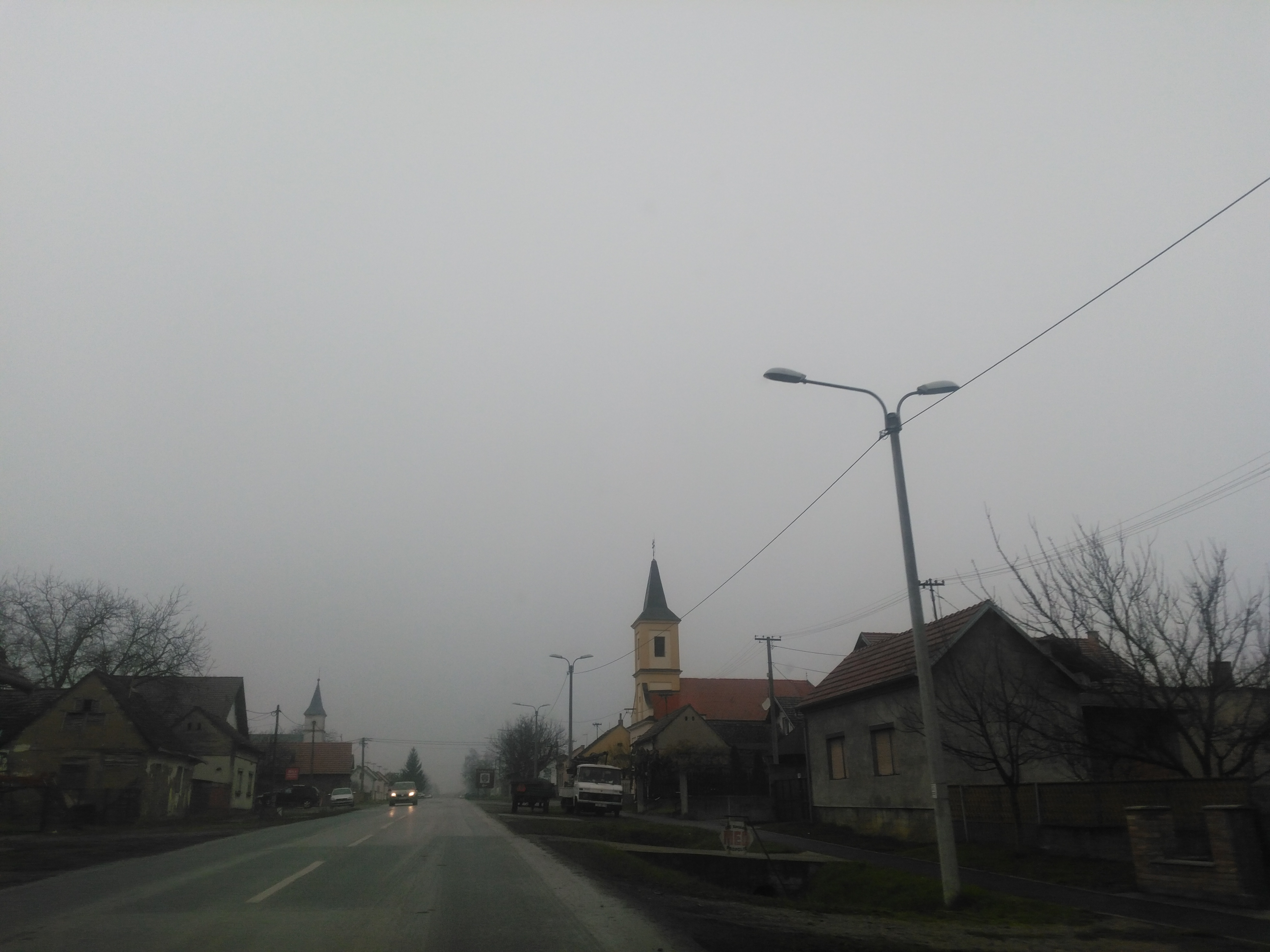
- Interactive map of Bukovlje
- Location of Bukovlje in Croatia
- Coordinates: 45°11′24″N 18°4′12″E
- Country: Croatia
- County: Brod-Posavina County

Government
  - Mayor: Igor Đaković (HDZ)

Area
  - Municipality: 31.0 km^{2} (12.0 sq mi)
  - Urban: 4.6 km^{2} (1.8 sq mi)

Population (2021)
  - Municipality: 2,727
  - Density: 88.0/km^{2} (228/sq mi)
  - Urban: 1,733
  - Urban density: 380/km^{2} (980/sq mi)
- Postal code: 35000 Slavonski Brod
- Website: bukovlje.hr

Bukovlje is a village and a municipality in Brod-Posavina County, Croatia.

== Demographics ==
In 2021, the municipality had 2,727 residents in the following settlements:

- Bukovlje, population 1,733
- Ježevik, population 59
- Korduševci, population 153
- Šušnjevci, population 207
- Vranovci, population 575
Bukovlje: Population trends 1857–2021
v

population	681	764	686	912	1076	1284	1246	1425	1340	1515	1751	2083	1551	1622	2739	3108	2727
	1857	1869	1880	1890	1900	1910	1921	1931	1948	1953	1961	1971	1981	1991	2001	2011	2021

Sources: Croatian Bureau of Statistics publications

== Politics ==
=== Minority councils ===
At the 2023 Croatian national minorities councils and representatives elections the Serbs of Croatia fulfilled legal requirements to elect 10 members minority councils of the Municipality of Bukovlje, but the elections were not held due to a lack of candidates.
