= Novi Kobaš =

Novi Kobaš Novo Selo
- Village
- Location within Croatia
- Coordinates: 45°06′N 17°44′E
- Country: Croatia
- County: Brod-Posavina County

Population (2011)
  - Total: 0
- Time zone: UTC+1 (CET)
  - Summer (DST): UTC+2 (CEST)

Novi Kobaš is an uninhabited settlement in Croatia.

== Demographics ==
Village of Novi Kobaš: Population trends 1857–2021
v

population	178	148	158	210	243	285	244	244
	1857	1869	1880	1890	1900	1910	1921	1931	1948	1953	1961	1971	1981	1991	2001	2011	2021

Note:Novo Selo until 1900. For the 1948 census it was transferred to Slavonski Kobaš. Sources: Croatian Bureau of Statistics publications
