= Podbrezovica =

Coordinates: 46°11′38″N 15°48′43″E

- Village
- Interactive map of Podbrezovica
- Country: Croatia
- County: Krapina-Zagorje County

Area
  - Total: 2.5 km^{2} (0.97 sq mi)

Population (2021)
  - Total: 251
  - Density: 100/km^{2} (260/sq mi)
- Time zone: UTC+1 (CET)
  - Summer (DST): UTC+2 (CEST)

Podbrezovica is a village in Croatia.
