= Slobodna Vlast =

- Village (Selo)
- Interactive map of Slobodna Vlast
- Location within Osijek-Baranja County Location within Croatia Location within Europe
- Country: Croatia
- County: Osijek-Baranja
- Municipality: Levanjska Varoš

Area
  - Total: 14.3 km^{2} (5.5 sq mi)

Population (2021)
  - Total: 121
  - Density: 8.46/km^{2} (21.9/sq mi)
- Time zone: UTC+1 (CET)
  - Summer (DST): UTC+2 (CEST)

Slobodna Vlast (Serbian Cyrillic: Слободна Власт, Hungarian: Szabadfalu) is a village in Croatia. It is connected by the D38 highway.
