= Malinci =

- Village
- Location within Croatia
- Coordinates: 45°43′N 15°20′E
- Country: Croatia

Area
  - Total: 1.7 km^{2} (0.66 sq mi)

Population (2021)
  - Total: 0
  - Density: 0.0/km^{2} (0.0/sq mi)
- Time zone: UTC+1 (CET)
  - Summer (DST): UTC+2 (CEST)

Malinci is an uninhabited settlement in Karlovac County, Croatia.
