= Vranovci, Croatia =

Coordinates: 45°10′58″N 18°05′01″E

- Interactive map of Vranovci, Croatia

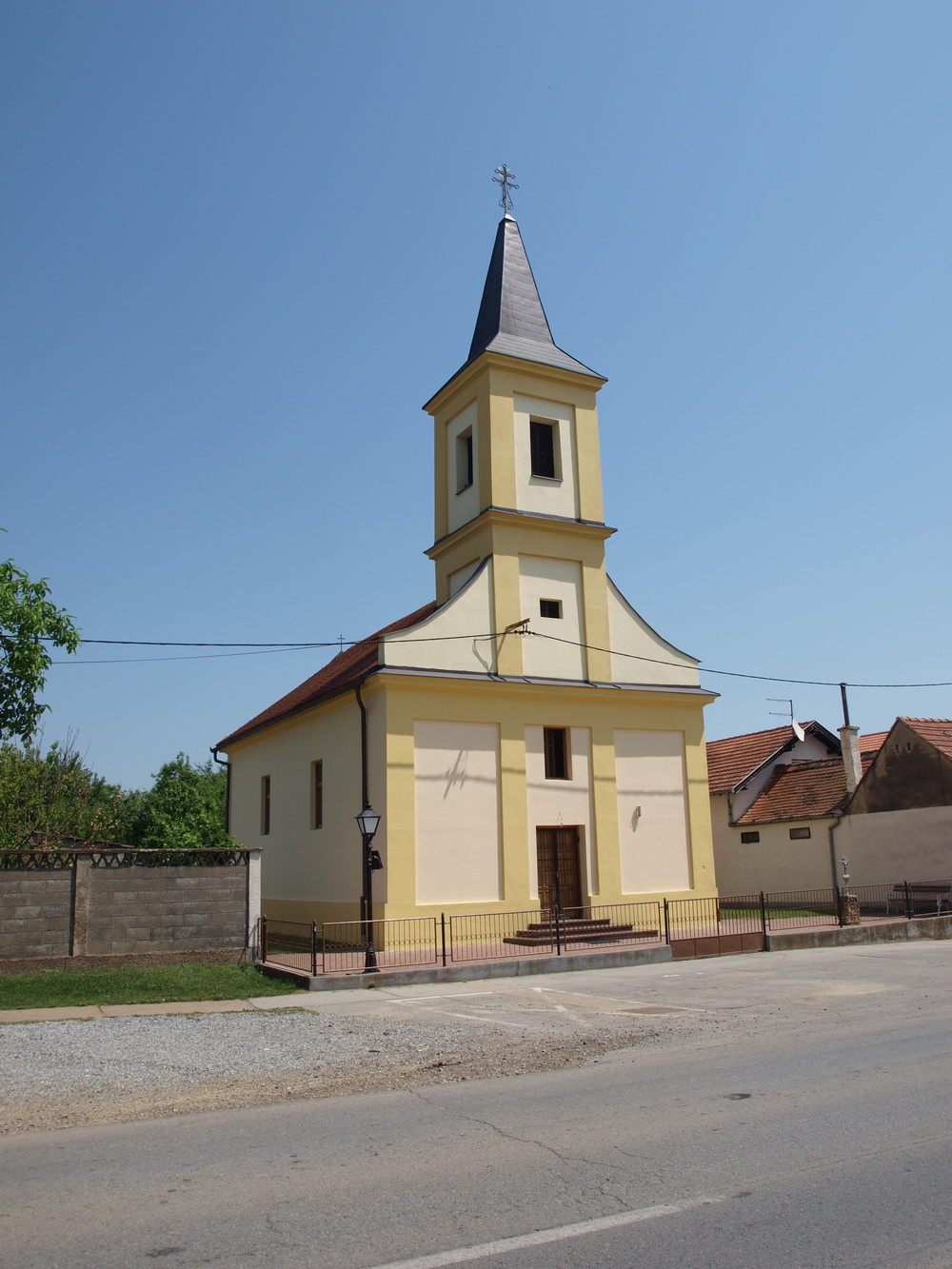

Vranovci is a village near Bukovlje, Croatia. In the 2011 census, it had 644 inhabitants.
