= Crnogovci =

- Village
- Location within Croatia
- Coordinates: 45°12′N 17°29′E
- Country: Croatia

Population (2011)
  - Total: 0
- Time zone: UTC+1 (CET)
  - Summer (DST): UTC+2 (CEST)

Crnogovci is a former settlement in the Republic of Croatia, located in the municipality of Staro Petrovo Selo in Brod-Posavina County.

== History ==
Crnogovci existed until 1880, when it was divided into the settlements of Donji Crnogovci and Gornji Crnogovci.

== Population ==
According to the 1880 census, when it was an independent settlement, Crnogovci had a population of 213.

Kretanje broja stanovnika 1857. – 2001.
v

| population | 166 | 203 | 213 |
| | 1857 | 1869 | 1880 | 1890 | 1900 | 1910 | 1921 | 1931 | 1948 | 1953 | 1961 | 1971 | 1981 | 1991 | 2001 |

Sources: Croatian Bureau of Statistics publications
