= Vrbovačko Brdo =

- Village
- Location within Croatia
- Coordinates: 45°14′N 17°34′E
- Country: Croatia

Population (2011)
  - Total: 0
- Time zone: UTC+1 (CET)
  - Summer (DST): UTC+2 (CEST)

Vrbovačko Brdo is an uninhabited settlement in Croatia. The village had a population as high as 271 in 1953 but has been abandoned since 1991.
