= Albertinovac =

- Village (Selo)
- Location within Croatia
- Coordinates: 45°31′09″N 18°14′42″E
- Country: Croatia
- County: Osijek-Baranja County
- Municipality: Koška
- Time zone: UTC+1 (CET)
  - Summer (DST): UTC+2 (CEST)

Albertinovac is a hamlet in Croatia, part of the village of Ledenik in Koška municipality. Until 1960s Albertinovac was an independent settlement, when it was merged with Ledenik.
