= Žugaj =

Žugaj is a Croatian surname. Notable people with the surname include:

- Nenad Žugaj (born 1983), Croatian wrestler; twin brother of Neven
- Neven Žugaj (born 1983), Croatian wrestler, twin brother of Nenad

== See also ==
- Ryszard Żugaj (born 1957), Polish swimmer
