= Hrib, Croatia =

Hrib Hrib-Skednari, Skednari
- Village
- Interactive map of Hrib
- Location within Croatia
- Coordinates: 45.514°N 14.675°E
- Country: Croatia
- County: Primorje-Gorski Kotar County
- City: Čabar

Area
  - Total: 8.7 km^{2} (3.4 sq mi)

Population (2021)
  - Total: 85
  - Density: 9.8/km^{2} (25/sq mi)
- Time zone: UTC+1 (CET)
  - Summer (DST): UTC+2 (CEST)
- Postal code: 51306 Čabar
- Area code: +385 (0)51

Hrib is a village in Croatia, under the town of Čabar, in Primorje-Gorski Kotar County.

== Geography ==
Administratively, Hrib encompasses a collection of hamlets. The central hamlet is Skednari. The other hamlets are: Brezovci, Dolari, Konjci, Kupari Donji, Kupari Gornji, Lazari, Markci, Mogušari, Mošun, Podgrić, Putari, Srednji Hrib, Steklice, Šafari and Živci.

The Ponikve dolines lie in the Kupari valley, close to Lazari, on the slopes of Mošun.

== History ==
On 27 March 2022 at 14:47 the ŽVOC Rijeka received a call about a wildfire in the area. 50 hectares (120 acres) burned by the time it was localised at 17:32 and put out at 18:00 by 60 firefighters and 11 vehicles from DVD Čabar, DVD Gerovo, DVD Tršće, DVD Prezid and DVD Plešce.

== Demographics ==
Village of Hrib: Population trends 1857–2021
v

population	560	487	374	428	427	521	465	495	391	388	340	305	233	165	130	109	85
	1857	1869	1880	1890	1900	1910	1921	1931	1948	1953	1961	1971	1981	1991	2001	2011	2021

Note:"Skednari" until 1900, and "Hrib-Skednari" between 1948 and 1981. Includes population of a number of former villages which were independent until 1931, with the exception of Brezovci which remained independent until 1948: Konjci, Kupari, Markci, Mošun, Podgrič, Putari, Srednji Hrib, Steklice and Šafari. Sources: Croatian Bureau of Statistics publications

== Bibliography ==
=== Genealogy ===
- Barac-Grum, Vida (1987-06-28). "Pogled na gorskokotarsku povijesnu antroponimiju" [A View into the Historical Anthroponymy of Gorski Kotar]. Rasprave Instituta za hrvatski jezik (in Croatian). 13 (1): 5–8. ISSN 1331-6745.
