= Milićevo Selo =

Milićevo Selo Милићево Село
- Village
- Location within Serbia
- Coordinates: 43°47′49″N 20°05′52″E
- Country: Serbia
- District: Zlatibor District
- Municipality: Požega

Area
  - Total: 11.9 km^{2} (4.6 sq mi)

Population (2022)
  - Total: 543
  - Density: 45.6/km^{2} (118/sq mi)
- Time zone: UTC+1 (CET)
  - Summer (DST): UTC+2 (CEST)

Milićevo Selo is a village in the municipality of Požega, western Serbia. According to the 2022 census, the village has a population of 542 people.
