= Jezernice, Croatia =

Jezernice
- Village
- Location within Croatia
- Coordinates: 45°43′N 15°22′E
- Country: Croatia

Population (2011)
  - Total: 0
- Time zone: UTC+1 (CET)
  - Summer (DST): UTC+2 (CEST)

Jezernice is an uninhabited settlement in Croatia. In 1835, the village had 11 houses and 123 inhabitants.
