= Gašinci =

Coordinates: 45°20′02″N 18°18′40″E

- Village (Selo)
- Interactive map of Gašinci

Gašinci is a village near Satnica Đakovačka, Croatia. In the 2011 census, it had 691 inhabitants.

== History ==
In 1944, Josip "Sepi" Feldinger" (15 September 1919 – 15 August or 11 November 1944), an ethnic German SS member born in Gašinci, wounded in Bijeljina and taken to the hospital in Zagreb where he died, or was killed in Tokaj.

== Bibliography ==
- Geiger, Vladimir; Šola, Pero (2017-10-31). "Žrtvoslov Malog Nabrđa – Drugi svjetski rat i poraće: pokušaj revizije podataka o ljudskim gubitcima nestalog i zaboravljenog slavonskog sela" [The List of Victims of Malo Nabrđe – World War II and the Post-War Period: An Attempt of Data Revision on Human Losses in a Vanished and Forgotten Slavonian Village]. Scrinia Slavonica: Godišnjak Podružnice za povijest Slavonije, Srijema i Baranje Hrvatskog instituta za povijest (in Serbo-Croatian). 17: 291–378. eISSN 1848-9109.
