= Čenkovo =

- Village
- Location within Croatia
- Coordinates: 45°20′N 18°06′E
- Country: Croatia

Area
  - Total: 11.3 km^{2} (4.4 sq mi)

Population (2021)
  - Total: 1
  - Density: 0.088/km^{2} (0.23/sq mi)
- Time zone: UTC+1 (CET)
  - Summer (DST): UTC+2 (CEST)

Čenkovo is an uninhabited settlement in Croatia.
