= Karlovac Feričanački =

- Location of Karlovac Feričanački within Croatia
- Coordinates: 45°31′N 17°54′E
- Country: Croatia
- County: Virovitica-Podravina County

Area
  - Total: 1.0 km^{2} (0.39 sq mi)
- Elevation: 0 m (0 ft)

Population (2021)
  - Total: 9
  - Density: 9.0/km^{2} (23/sq mi)
- Time zone: UTC+1 (CET)
  - Summer (DST): UTC+2 (CEST)
- Postal code: 33515 Orahovica
- Area code: 033

Karlovac Feričanački is a village in north-eastern Slavonia, situated in municipality town of Orahovica, Virovitica-Podravina County, Croatia.

== Population and Demographics ==
Karlovac Feričanački
Year of census	2001.	1991.	1981.	1971.	1961.
Croats	16 (61.53%)	12 (44.44%)	10 (23.25%)	20 (30.76%)	10 (15.15%)
Serbs	10 (38.46%)	13 (48.14%)	21 (48.83%)	36 (55.38%)	56 (84.84%)
Yugoslavs	0	2 (7.40%)	12 (27.90%)	9 (13.84%)	0
others and unknown	0	0	0	0	0
Total	26	27	43	65	66
