= Karlovac, Glamoč =

Karlovac
- Village
- Location within Bosnia and Herzegovina
- Coordinates: 43°58′55.95″N 16°55′15.21″E
- Country: Bosnia and Herzegovina
- Entity: Federation of Bosnia and Herzegovina
- Canton: Canton 10
- Municipality: Glamoč

Area
  - Total: 48.20 km^{2} (18.61 sq mi)

Population (2013)
  - Total: 97
  - Density: 2.0/km^{2} (5.2/sq mi)
- Time zone: UTC+1 (CET)
  - Summer (DST): UTC+2 (CEST)

Karlovac (Serbian Cyrillic: Карловац) is a village in the Municipality of Glamoč in Canton 10 of the Federation of Bosnia and Herzegovina, an entity of Bosnia and Herzegovina.

== Demographics ==
According to the 2013 census, the village was uninhabited.

== Bibliography ==
- Ethnicity/National Affiliation, Religion and Mother Tongue (PDF). Sarajevo: Agency for Statistics of Bosnia and Herzegovina. 2019.
