= Gora pri Pečah =

Gora pri Pečah Gora Svetega Florjana (until 1955)
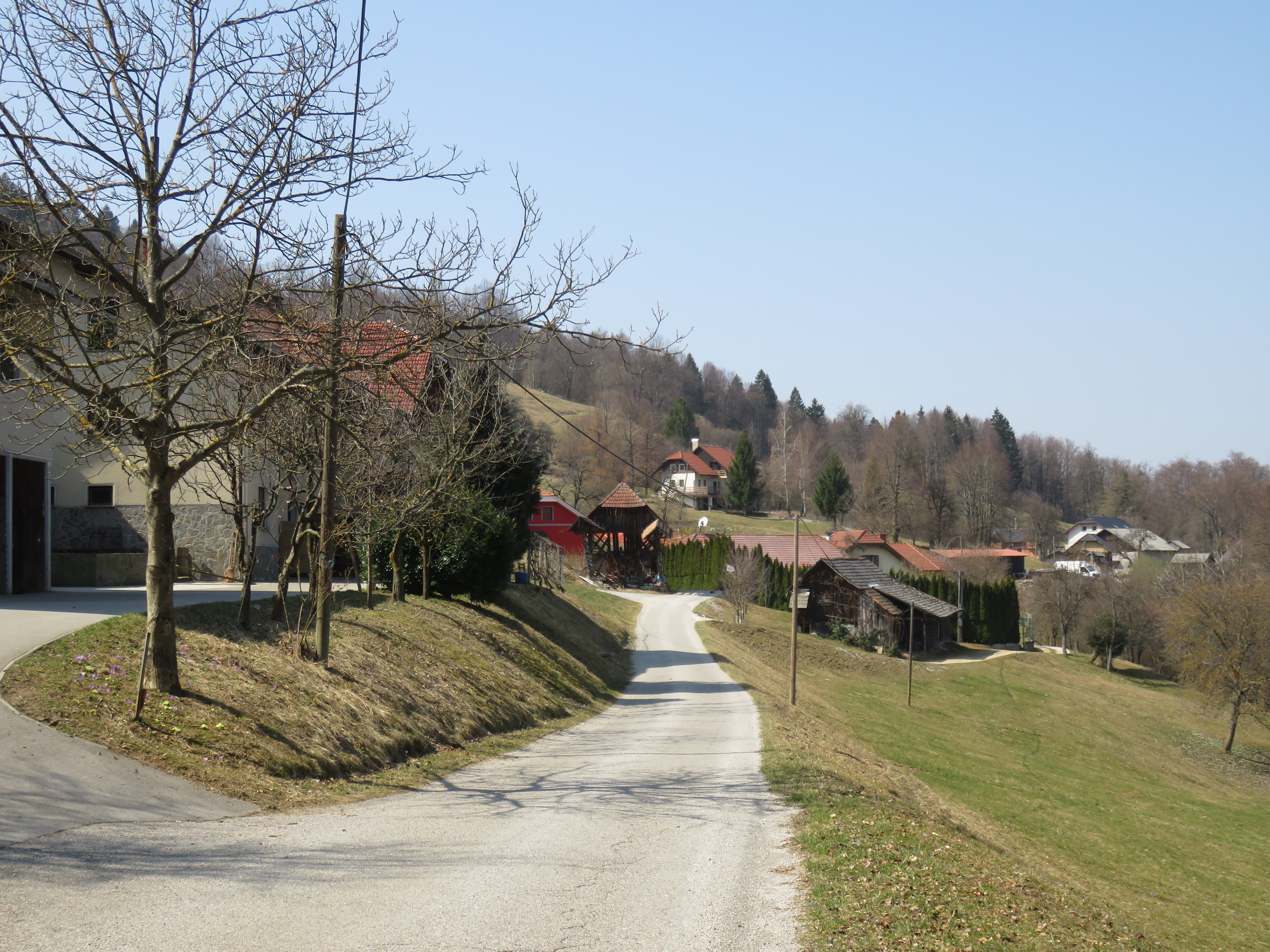

- Location in Slovenia
- Coordinates: 46°8′12.69″N 14°47′56.86″E
- Country: Slovenia
- Traditional region: Upper Carniola
- Statistical region: Central Slovenia
- Municipality: Moravče

Area
  - Total: 3.65 km^{2} (1.41 sq mi)
- Elevation: 450.1 m (1,477 ft)

Population (2002)
  - Total: 111
- Postal code: 1251

Gora pri Pečah (pronounced [ˈɡɔːɾa pɾi ˈpeːtʃax]) is a settlement in the Municipality of Moravče in central Slovenia. The area is part of the traditional region of Upper Carniola. It is now included with the rest of the municipality in the Central Slovenia Statistical Region.

== Name ==
Gora pri Pečah was attested in historical sources as Perg in 1444. The name of the settlement was changed from Gora svetega Florjana (literally, 'Mount Saint Florian') to Gora pri Pečah (literally, 'mountain near Peče') in 1955. The name was changed on the basis of the 1948 Law on Names of Settlements and Designations of Squares, Streets, and Buildings as part of efforts by Slovenia's postwar communist government to remove religious elements from toponyms.

== Church ==
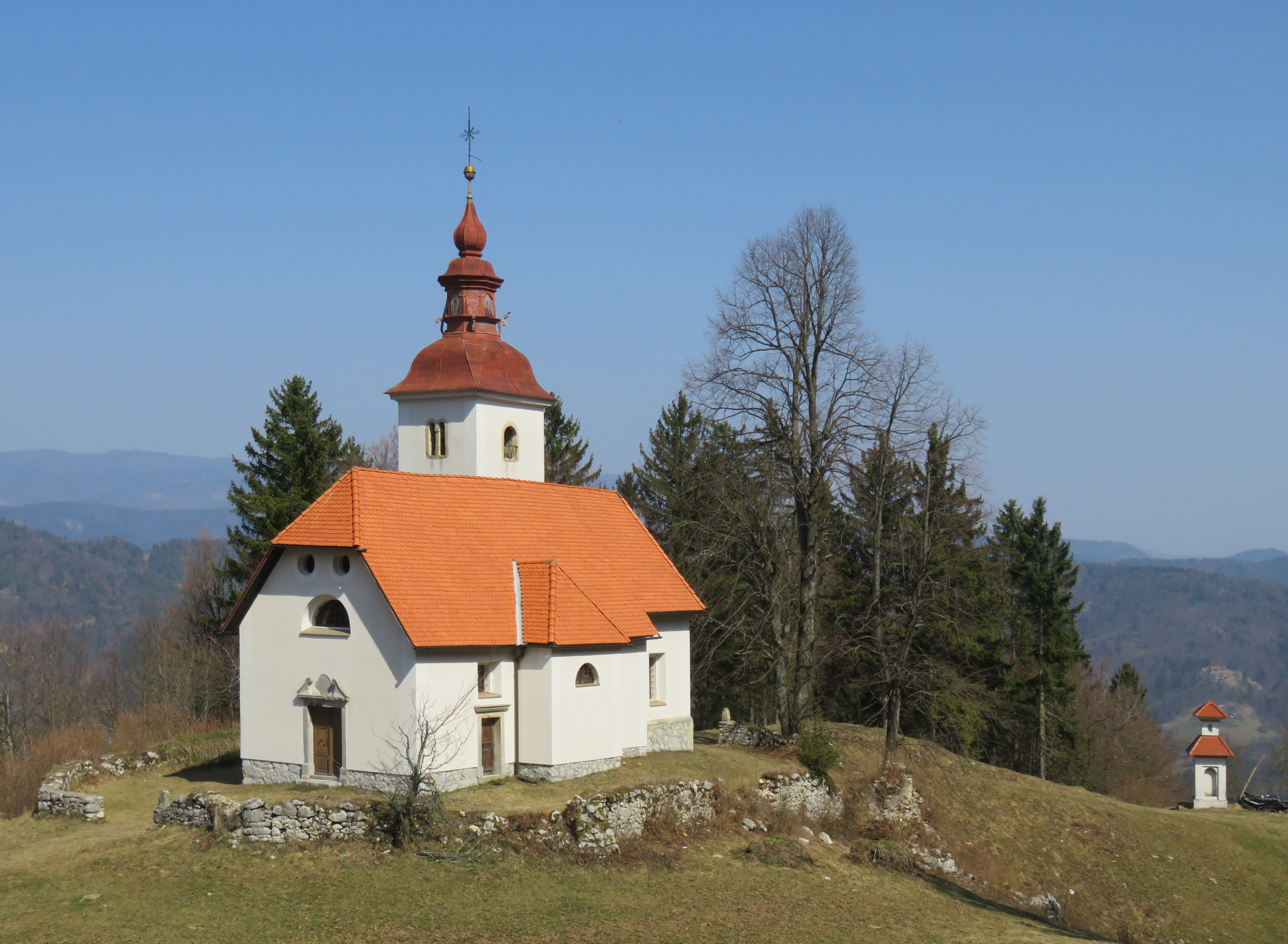
Saint Florian's Church

The local church is dedicated to Saint Florian and belongs to the Parish of Vače. It dates to the early 16th century but was extensively rebuilt in the late 17th century.
