= Brod Moravice =

- Municipality
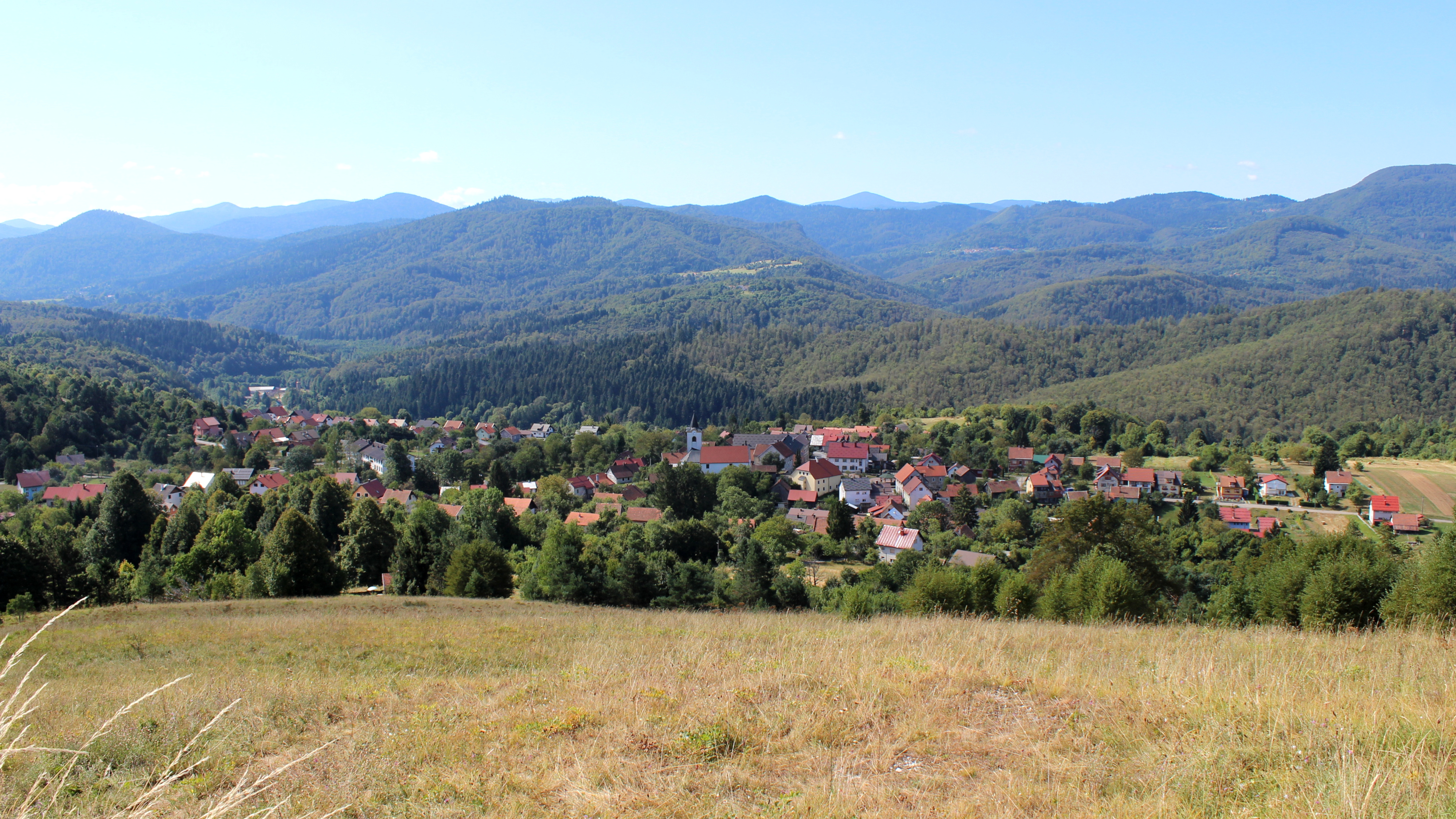
- Interactive map of Brod Moravice
- Location within Croatia
- Coordinates: 45°27′36″N 14°58′12″E
- Country: Croatia
- Region: Gorski Kotar
- County: Primorje-Gorski Kotar County

Government
  - Mayor: Dragutin Crnković

Area
  - Municipality: 23.9 sq mi (62.0 km^{2})
  - Urban: 1.3 sq mi (3.4 km^{2})

Population (2021)
  - Municipality: 663
  - Density: 27.7/sq mi (10.7/km^{2})
  - Urban: 270
  - Urban density: 210/sq mi (79/km^{2})
- Time zone: UTC+1 (CET)
  - Summer (DST): UTC+2 (CEST)
- Website: brodmoravice.hr

Brod Moravice is a town and municipality in the Primorje-Gorski Kotar County in western Croatia. The Lujzijana road passes through it.

== History ==
Brod Moravice was first mentioned in 1260. The rural municipality was founded in the 14th century. Throughout history, it has also been known as Moravice, Gornje Moravice, Turanj and Brodske Moravice. The name was first recorded in one of Bela IV's documents in 1260. The first settlements appeared in Gorski kotar as early as the 10th or 11th centuries, due to the fact that routes to the coast passed through this area.

During the 15th and 16th centuries, the municipality was the subject of numerous Turkish raids.

On 4 June 1657, as part of a delimitation between the possessions of the Zrinski family in Brod and those of the Frankapan family in Severin, a document was drawn up before a committee in Moravičke Drage consisting of baron Planker oberhautmann of Karlovac on behalf of Juraj IV Frankapan and Juraj Sili kapetan dvoranski and vicekapetan of Žumberak and Boltizar Babonosić prefect of Ozalj on behalf of Petar Zrinski. Those who gave testimony about the boundary were Martin Goljak (80), Matija Šnepergar (80), Mihajlo Šepec (80), Petar Butina (85), Petar Abramović (85), Lovro Crnković (85), Juraj Šnepergar (88), Juraj Podnar (90), Matija Goljak (90), Jakov Goršet (90), Jakov Butina (90) and Martin Blažević who claimed to be a centenarian and helped build the Turanj tower in Gornje Moravice when ordered by brothers Juraj and Nikola Zrinski.

In 1860–1879, Matija Mažuranić wrote a 62 folio manuscript today titled Writings on the Building of Roads in Gorski Kotar and Lika (Croatian: Spisi o gradnji cesta u Gorskom Kotaru i Lici), today with signature HR-ZaNSK R 6424. A 21 folio manuscript dated 1872 titled Darstellung der Entstehung des Baues ... der Luisenstrasse together with a translation by I. Mikloušić is kept as HR-ZaNSK R 4572.

In 1864, a rinderpest outbreak in Bosanci and Kasuni caused the Lujzijana to be closed to horned traffic for 21 days in December.

The volunteer fire department DVD Brod Moravice was founded in 1912, and is today part of the Požarno područje Gorski kotar IV. Its current commander is Goran Magdić.

=== Kingdom of Yugoslavia ===
A 22 December 1939 decision as part of agrarian reforms by Ban Šubašić to confiscate the local forest property of the Thurn and Taxis family, Kálmán Ghyczy and Nikola Petrović resulted in a legal dispute known as the Thurn and Taxis Affair, in part because of the relative status of the family and in part because of the proximity to the Italian border.

=== WWII ===
On 3 July 1942, a freight train was derailed together with 5 cistern wagons either between Brod Moravice and Hrvatske Moravice or between Delnice and Brod Moravice.

At 19:00 on 11 September, a group of around 1000 Partisans from the Primorje-Gorski Kotar Detachment attacked a guard stationed at the power plant consisting of 20 Domobrans of the 25th company of the 3rd Regiment of the Second Division, capturing the plant and blowing it up with explosives, leaving Brod Moravice, Delnice and Skrad without electricity.

At 18:30 on the 16th, the same group of Partisans attacked with machine gun and rifle fire the garrison in Brod Moravice, setting fire to 6 villagers' homes. Battles lasted until 5:30 the next day, on which the attack was repelled.

=== Modern ===
On 12 December 2017, a severe wind hit Brod Moravice, leaving it without electricity for several days and blocking traffic in the area. This followed the ice storm and occurred during the Ips typographus epidemic in local forests.

On 11 June 2019, hail up to 12 centimetres (4.7 in) in diameter fell in Brod Moravice.

== Geography ==
The municipality, part of the historic and geographic large region of the Littoral, is located in the mountain range close to Croatian borders with Slovenia. It is 65 km from Karlovac, 71 from Rijeka, 114 from Zagreb, 104 from Ljubljana and 144 from Trieste.

== Demographics ==
In 1895, the obćina of Brod Moravice (court at Brod Moravice), with an area of 47 square kilometres (18 mi^{2}), belonged to the kotar of Delnice (Delnice court and electoral district) in the županija of Modruš-Rieka (Ogulin court and financial board). There were 330 houses, with a population of 2297. Its 22 villages and 33 hamlets were divided for taxation purposes into 2 porezne obćine, under the Delnice office.

It is the smallest municipality by population, and the oldest one in its county.

The municipality is divided into 38 localities, included the town of Brod Moravice itself. In the 2011 census, there were a total of 985 inhabitants in the following settlements:

- Brod Moravice (270) ▼
- Colnari (0)
- Čučak (5) ▼
- Delači (9) ▼
- Doluš (5) ▲
- Donja Dobra (193) ▼
- Donja Lamana Draga (4) ▲
- Donji Šajn (0)
- Donji Šehovac (0) ▼
- Goliki (0)
- Gornja Lamana Draga (0)
- Gornji Kuti (28) ▼
- Gornji Šajn (15) ▲
- Gornji Šehovac (0)
- Goršeti (0) ▼
- Kavrani (0)
- Klepeće Selo (1) ▼
- Kocijani (5) ▼
- Lokvica (21) ▼
- Maklen (1) ▼
- Male Drage (5)
- Moravička Sela (37) ▼
- Naglići (1) ▲
- Nove Hiže (0)
- Novi Lazi (6) ▼
- Pauci (0) ▼
- Planica (1) ▼
- Podgorani (0) ▼
- Podstene (11) ▼
- Razdrto (1) ▼
- Smišljak (0)
- Stari Lazi (15) ▼
- Šepci Podstenski (4) ▲
- Šimatovo (1) ▼
- Vele Drage (20) ▼
- Zahrt (3) ▼
- Zavrh (1) ▲
- Završje (0)

By ethnicity, there were 96% Croats and 4% Italians in the same census.

Municipality of Brod Moravice: Population trends 1857–2021
v

| population | 2840 | 2866 | 2848 | 2919 | 2861 | 2823 | 2622 | 2555 | 2152 | 2220 | 2105 | 1855 | 1444 | 1196 | 985 | 866 | 663 |
| | 1857 | 1869 | 1880 | 1890 | 1900 | 1910 | 1921 | 1931 | 1948 | 1953 | 1961 | 1971 | 1981 | 1991 | 2001 | 2011 | 2021 |

Note:Split from the old Delnice općina Sources: Croatian Bureau of Statistics publications
Town of Brod Moravice: Population trends 1857–2021
v

| population | 467 | 501 | 497 | 517 | 499 | 456 | 415 | 411 | 351 | 393 | 452 | 421 | 408 | 443 | 408 | 358 | 270 |
| | 1857 | 1869 | 1880 | 1890 | 1900 | 1910 | 1921 | 1931 | 1948 | 1953 | 1961 | 1971 | 1981 | 1991 | 2001 | 2011 | 2021 |

Note:"Brod-Moravice" until 1971. Sources: Croatian Bureau of Statistics publications

== Religion ==
Its Catholic parish was first mentioned in the 14th century, and its parish church was built in 1434. In 1939, its parish had 2331 souls, plus 70 outside the country; it also administered the nearby Podstene parish. In 1974, its parish had 1400 souls, plus 50 outside the country.

List of parish priests of Brod Moravice:

- Stanko Ružić (b. Kostrena Sveta Lucija 1887-11-06, primiz Sušak 1913-05-20)
- ...
- Leopold Barić (b. Čamerovac 1933-02-26, primiz Senj 1965-07-04)

== Governance ==
=== National ===
At the 1920 Kingdom of Serbs, Croats and Slovenes Constitutional Assembly election in Modruš-Rijeka County, Brod Moravice voted mainly for the Croatian People's Peasant Party and to a lesser extent the Communist Party.

Results at the poll in Brod Moravice
| Year | Voters | Electors | NRS | DSD | KPJ | HPSS | Independent | SS | HSP | HZ |
|---|---|---|---|---|---|---|---|---|---|---|
| 1920 | 592 | 309 | | 8 | 50 | 229 | | | 1 | 21 |

=== Municipal ===
On 1 July 1893, Skrad obćina was divided into Skrad with tax districts Bukov Vrh and Divjake, and Brod-Moravice with tax districts Brod-Moravice and Završje.

== Sports ==
Beginning in 2013, the 7 stage 260 kilometres (160 mi) long Cycling Trail of Gorski Kotar (Croatian: Goranska biciklistička transverzala) passes through Brod Moravice.

In 1913, there were three gendarmeries in Delnice kotar: one in Delnice itself, one in Brod Moravice and one in Fužine.

== Attractions ==
The municipality counts lot of ancient church buildings. It is also a receptive place for tourism due to its natural environment.

The 600 metres (2,000 ft) long linden avenue was planted at the beginning of the 20th century.

== Infrastructure ==
Brod Moravice has an infirmary

== Transport ==
Brod Moravice is crossed by the state road D3 and the nearest motorway is the A6 (nearest exit is the n.3 "Ravna Gora"). As for railways, it counts a station on the line Rijeka-Ogulin-Karlovac-Zagreb.

== Notable people ==
- Matija Legović, biathlete

== Gallery ==
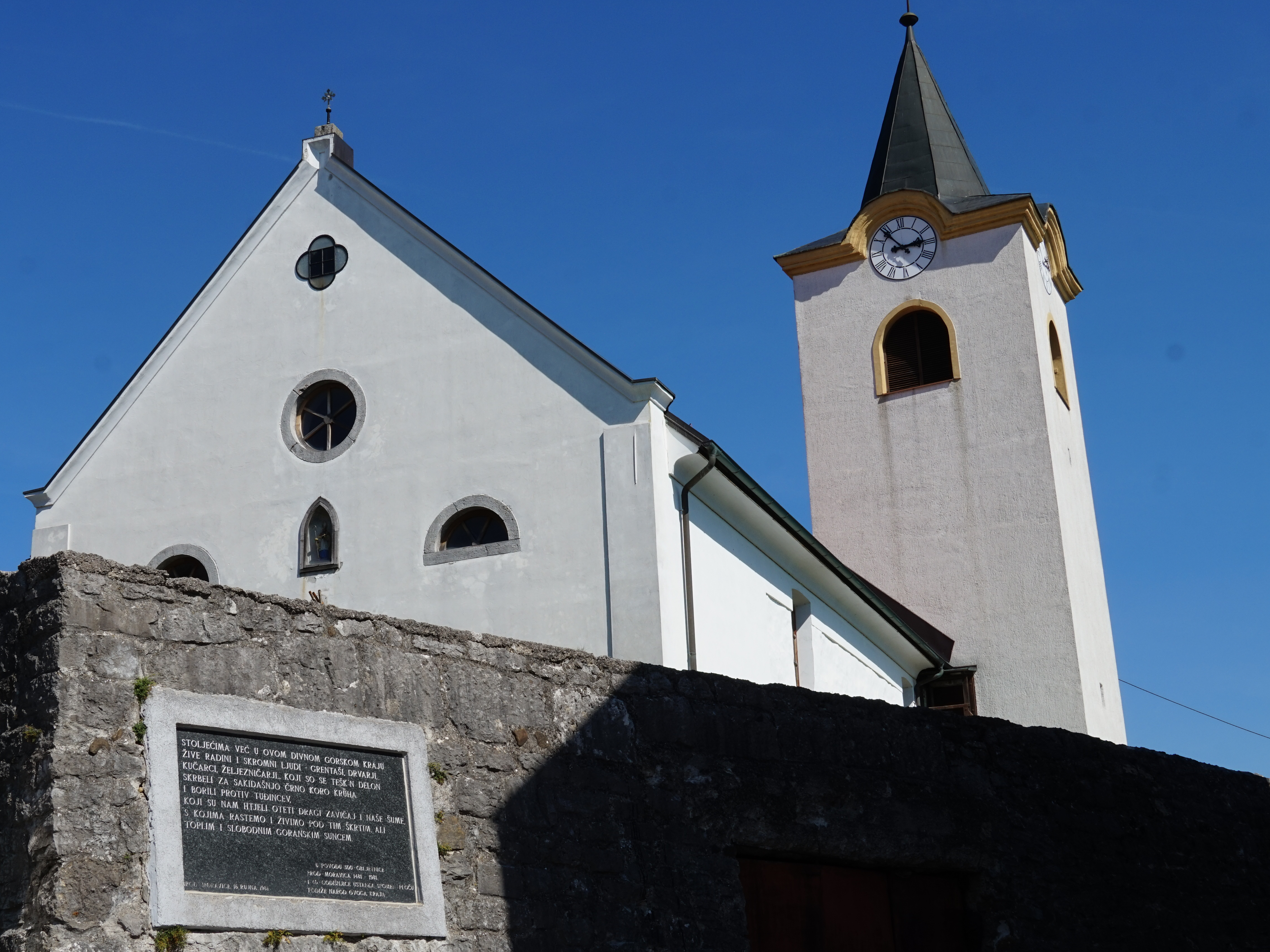
Sv. Nikole church.

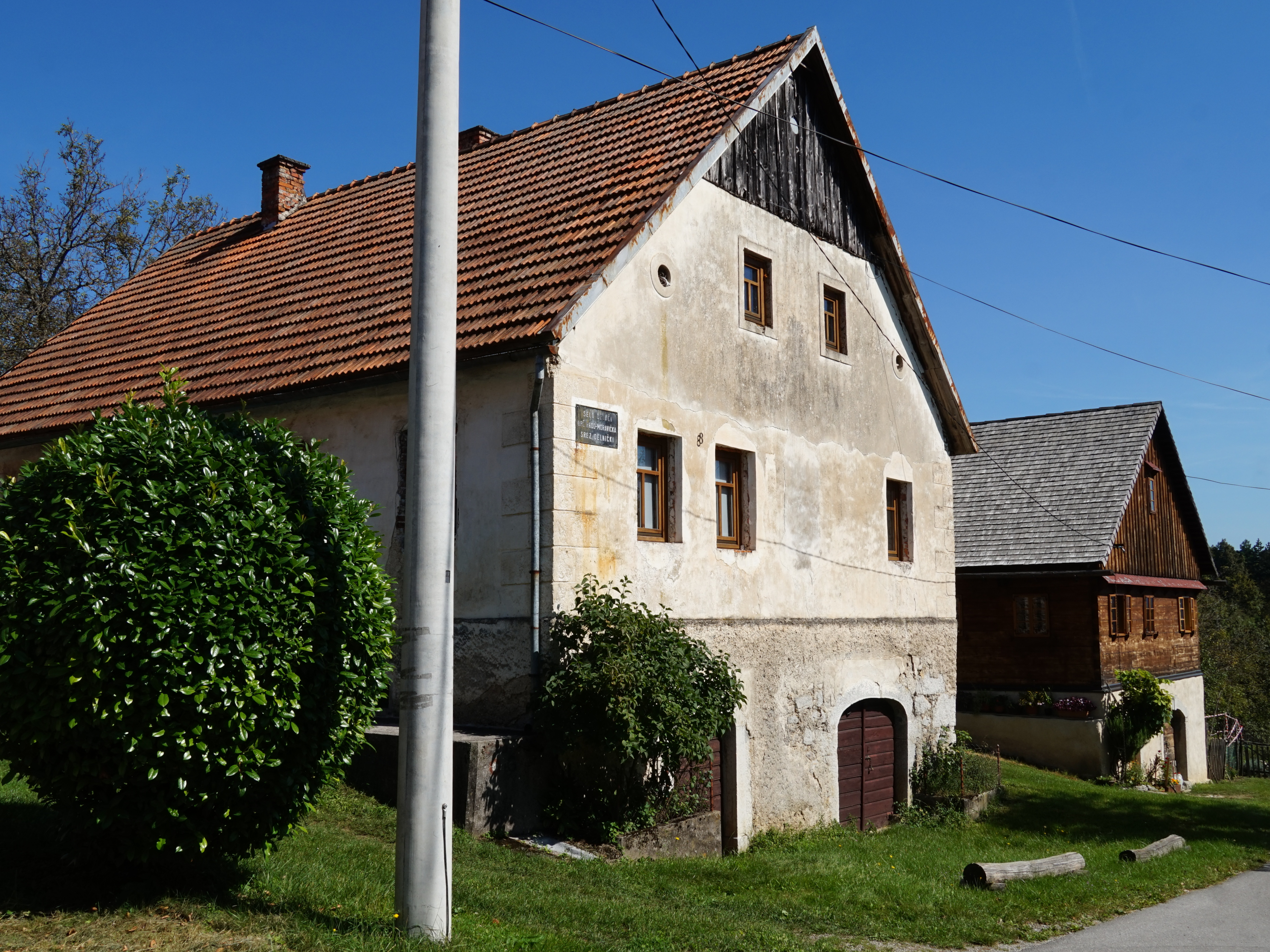
Houses on Delači street.

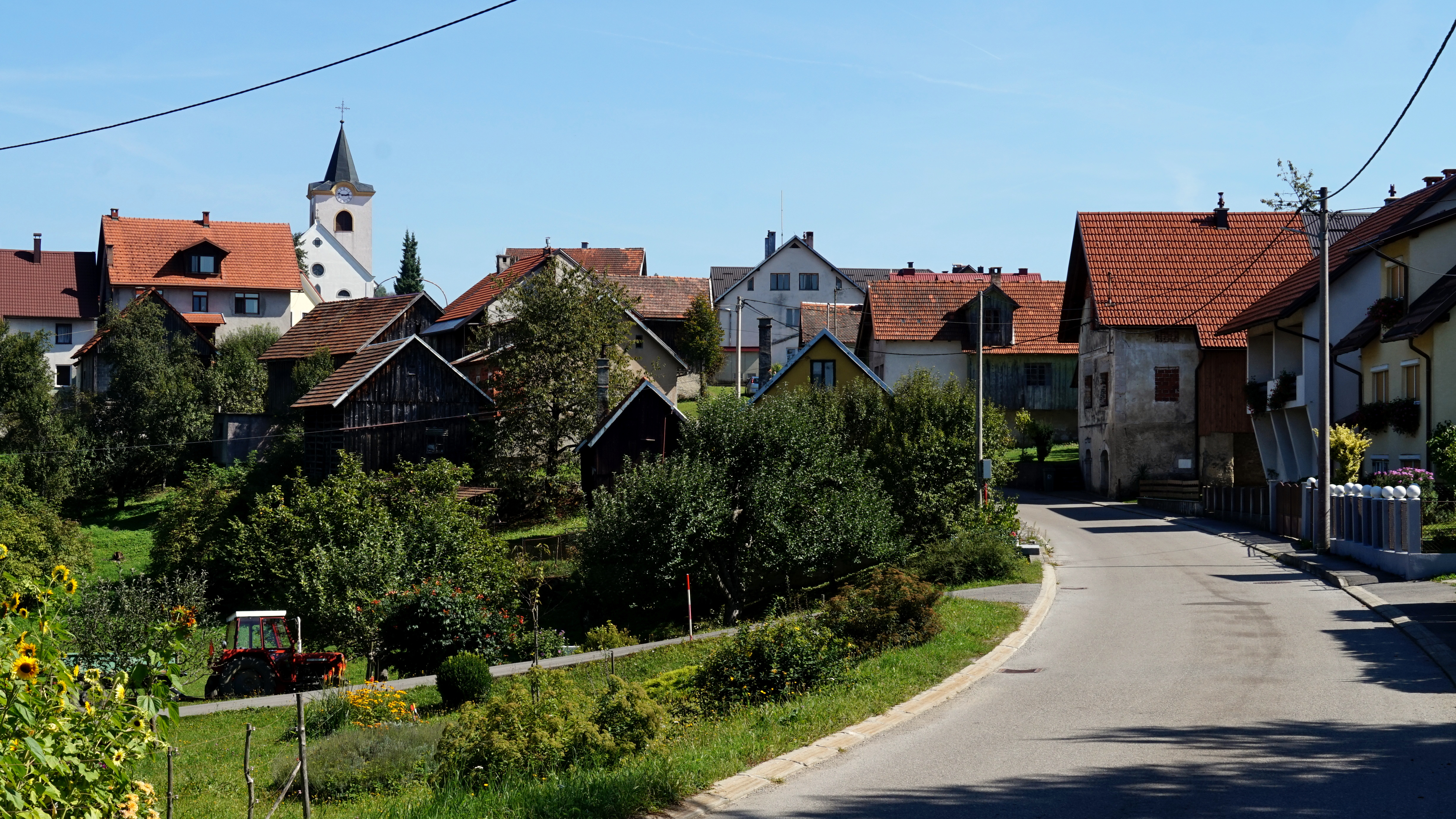
Kolodvorska street.

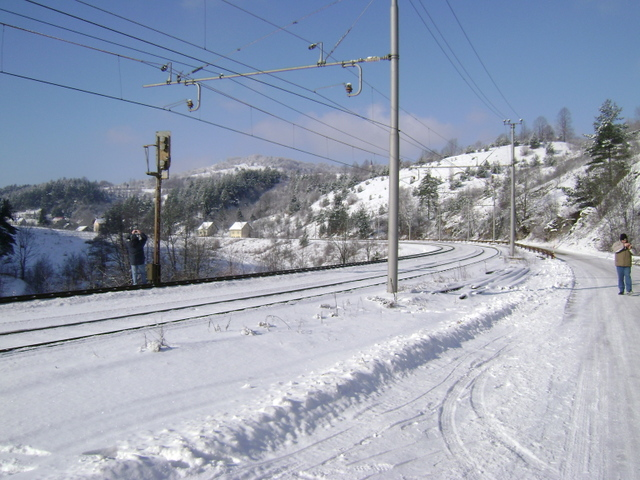
Brod Moravice railway station

== Bibliography ==
- Draganović, Krunoslav (1939-04-20). Opći šematizam Katoličke crkve u Jugoslaviji. Sarajevo: Akademija "Regina Apostolorum".
- Draganović, Krunoslav; Bezić, Srećko [in Croatian]; Crnković, Josip; Lešnik, Rafael; Mršo, Ivan [in Croatian]; Reven, Zdravko [in Slovenian]; Weber, Hinko (1975-05-05). Opći šematizam Katoličke Crkve u Jugoslaviji 1974 [General Directory of the Catholic Church in Yugoslavia 1974] (in Serbo-Croatian). Zagreb: Hrvatsko književno društvo sv. Ćirila i Metoda.
