= Goršeti =

- Village
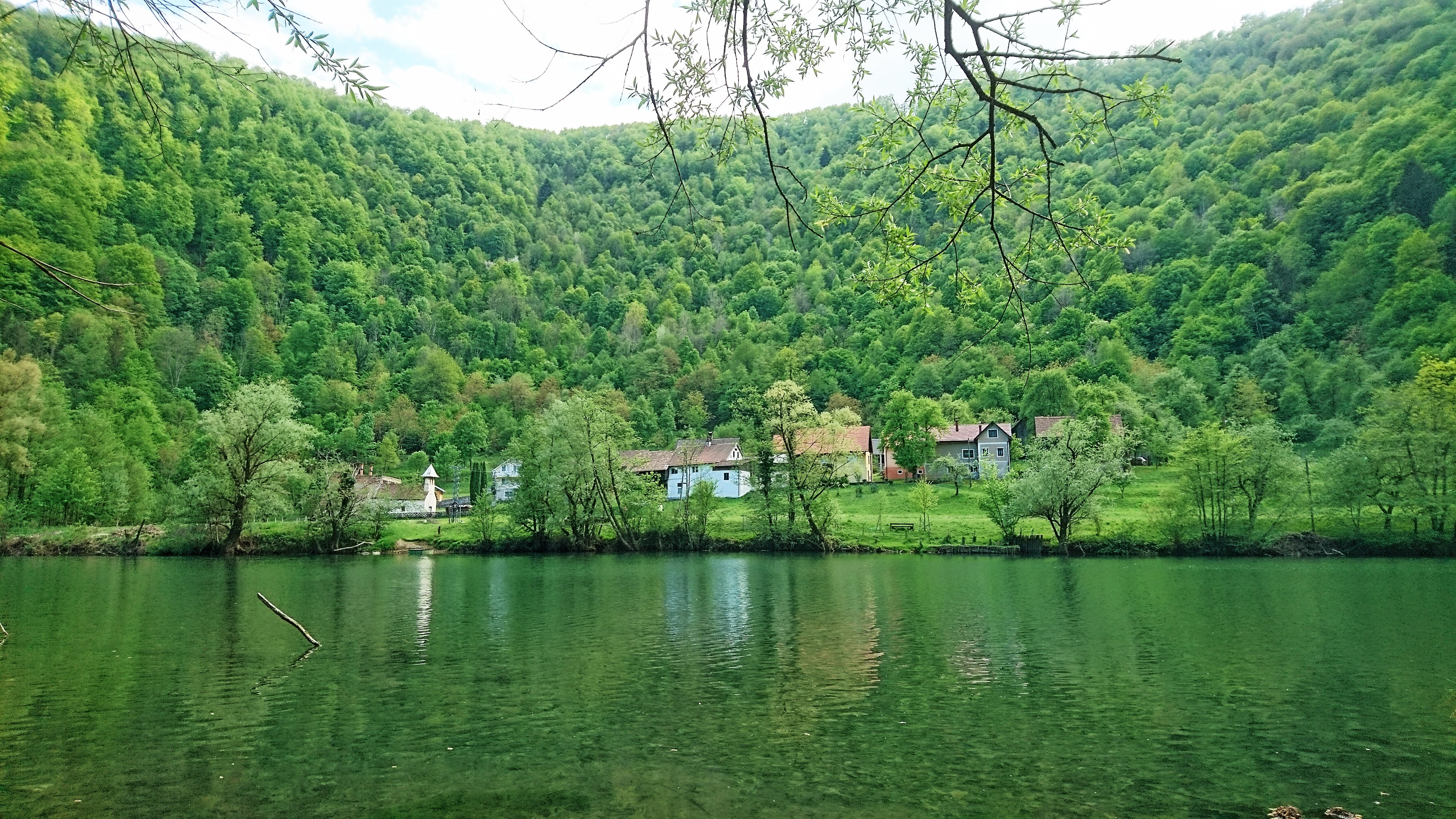

- Location within Croatia
- Coordinates: 45.495639°N 14.98807°E
- Country: Croatia
- County: Primorje-Gorski Kotar County
- City: Brod Moravice

Area
  - Total: 1.2 km^{2} (0.46 sq mi)

Population (2021)
  - Total: 0
  - Density: 0.0/km^{2} (0.0/sq mi)
- Time zone: UTC+1 (CET)
  - Summer (DST): UTC+2 (CEST)
- Postal code: 51326
- Area code: +385 051

Goršeti is a village in Croatia, under the Brod Moravice township, in Primorje-Gorski Kotar County.

== Geography ==
It is south of the Kupa, across from Vrt, west of Kavrani and Laze pri Predgradu, east of Donji Šajn and Klepeće Selo, and southeast of Gornji Šehovac and Donja Lamana Draga.

== History ==
Before the breakup of Yugoslavia, Saint Lucy's Day was celebrated in Goršeti by residents from both sides of the river.

Goršeti had been proposed as the location for the bridge in Blaževci, but Goršeti was given the choice between a bridge or a school, and they chose the school (now in ruins). The school was built with stones carried by workers on their shoulders from the Slovene side of the river. The road from Štefanci to Goršeti was built by the Šumarija Vrbovsko while felling Ostrya carpinifolia for axles and wheels.

On 18 July 2023, the wind of a thunderstorm hit the 35/20 KV Kupjak substation, leaving Goršeti without power.

== Demographics ==
Village of Goršeti: Population trends 1857–2021
v

population	50	42	46	48	49	44	44	52	53	41	37	19	17	11	3	2
	1857	1869	1880	1890	1900	1910	1921	1931	1948	1953	1961	1971	1981	1991	2001	2011	2021

Note:In 2001 the number shrunk because Kavrani was removed after being included in 1981 and 1991. Sources: Croatian Bureau of Statistics publications
