= Selce =

Selce (Cyrillic: Селце) may refer to:

== Albania ==
- Selcë, a settlement

== Croatia ==
- Selce, Croatia, a village near Crikvenica
- Selce Žumberačko, a village near Samobor
- Malo Selce, a village near Skrad
- Veliko Selce, a village near Skrad

== North Macedonia ==
- Selce, Kruševo, a village in Kruševo Municipality
- Selce, Prilep, a village near Prilep Municipality
- Selce, Tetovo, a village in Tetovo Municipality
- Selce, Štip, a village in Štip Municipality

== Slovakia ==
- Selce, Banská Bystrica District, a village and municipality
- Selce, Krupina District, a village and municipality
- Selce, Poltár District, a village and municipality

== Slovenia ==
- Selce, Lenart, a settlement in the municipality of Lenart
- Selce, Litija, a settlement in the municipality of Litija
- Selce, Lukovica, a settlement in the municipality of Lukovica
- Selce nad Blanco, formerly called Selce, a settlement in the municipality of Sevnica
- Selce, Pivka, a village in the municipality of Pivka
- Selce pri Leskovcu, formerly called Selce, a settlement in the municipality of Krško
- Selce pri Moravčah, formerly called Selce, a settlement in the Municipality of Moravče
- Selce, Tolmin, a village in the municipality of Tolmin
- Selce, Vojnik, a settlement in the municipality of Vojnik
- Selce, Zagorje ob Savi, a former village in the municipality of Zagorje ob Savi, now part of Tirna
- Selca, Železniki, formerly also known as Selce, a village in the municipality of Železniki

== See also ==
- Seltse (disambiguation) (Cyrl: Селце)
- Selca (disambiguation)
- Selci (disambiguation)
- Seoce (disambiguation)
- Seoca (disambiguation)
