= Šajn =

Šajn may refer to:

- Donji Šajn, a village in Croatia
- Gornji Šajn, a village in Croatia
- Adela Šajn (born 1990), Slovenian gymnast
- Anamarija Stibilj Šajn (born 1965), Slovenian art historian, curator, and art critic
- Srđan Šajn (born 1963), Serbian politician
