= Lamana Draga =

Lamana Draga may refer to:

- Donja Lamana Draga, a village in Croatia
- Gornja Lamana Draga a village in Croatia
