= Buzin =

Buzin may refer to:

- Buzin, Zagreb, a village near Zagreb, Croatia
- Buzin, Primorje-Gorski Kotar County, a village near Skrad, Croatia
- Bužin, a village near Buje, Istria County, Croatia
- Buzin (surname)
