= Podgorani =

Podgorani may refer to:

- Podgorani, Bosnia and Herzegovina, a village near Mostar
- Podgorani, Croatia, a village near Brod Moravice
