= Gornja Dobra =

Gornja Dobra may refer to:

- Gornja Dobra, Croatia, a village near Skrad
- Gornja Dobra (river), a river in Croatia
