= Smišljak =

Smišljak may refer to:

- Smišljak, Brod Moravice, a village near Brod Moravice, Primorje-Gorski Kotar County, Croatia
- Smišljak, Vrbovsko, a village near Vrbovsko, Primorje-Gorski Kotar County, Croatia
