= Zeleni Vir Hydroelectric Power Plant =

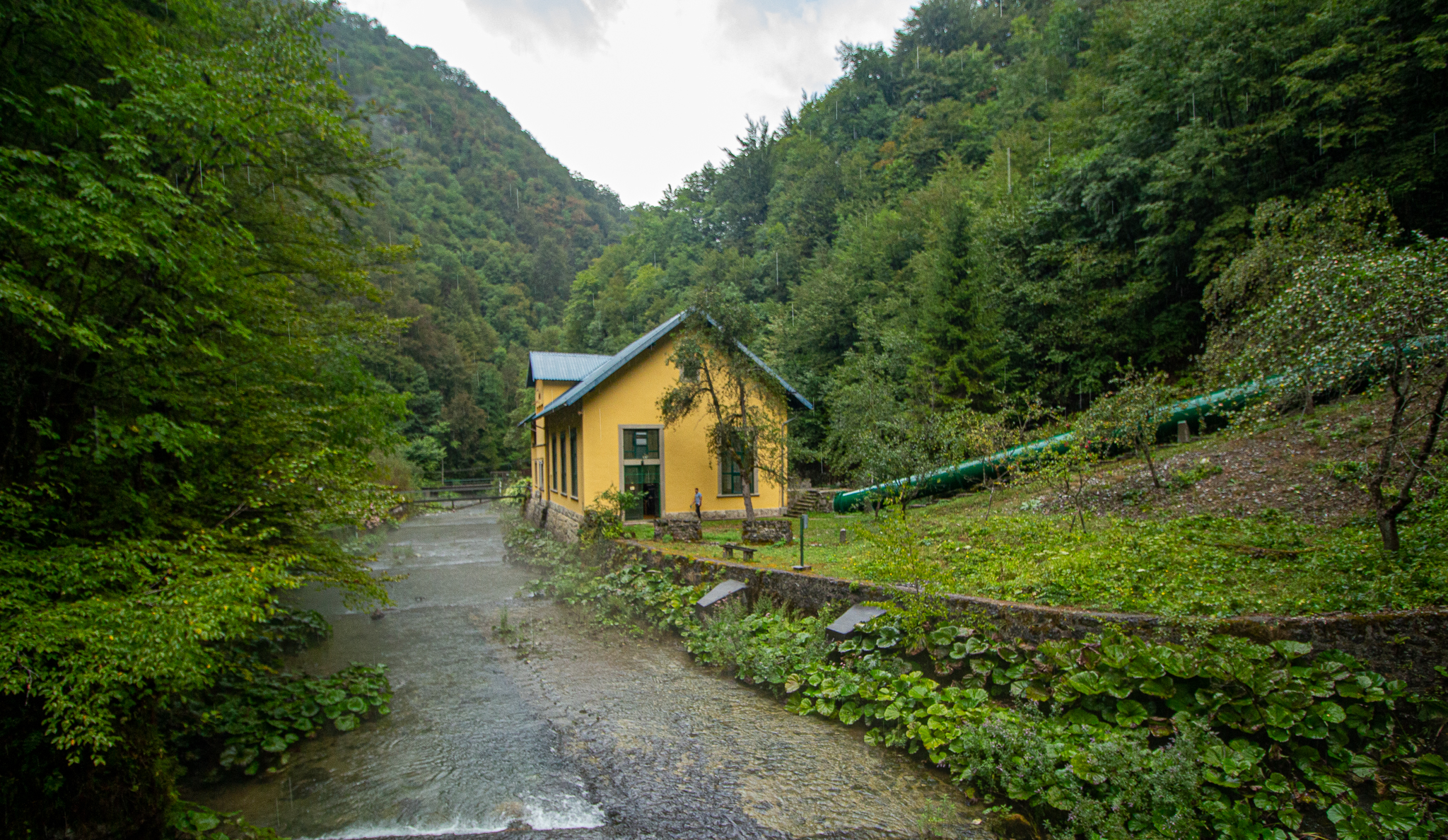
- Country: Croatia
- Coordinates: 45°27′N 14°53′E

External links
- Commons: Related media on Commons

Zeleni Vir Hydroelectric Power Plant is a hydroelectric power plant located near the town of Skrad, Gorski Kotar region in Croatia.

The Zeleni Vir Hydroelectric Power Plant is a high-pressure diversion plant that harnesses the water power of the Curak Brook with head of about 50 m. It was built in 1921.

It is operated by Hrvatska elektroprivreda.

== History ==
At 19:00 on 11 September 1942, a group of around 1000 Partisans attacked a guard stationed at the power plant consisting of 20 Domobrans of the 25th company of the 3rd Regiment of the Second Division, capturing the plant and blowing it up with explosives, leaving Brod Moravice, Delnice and Skrad without electricity.

== The Kupa River catchment hydroelectric power plants ==
- Ozalj Hydroelectric Power Plant
- Gojak Hydroelectric Power Plant
- Lešće Hydroelectric Power Plant
- Zeleni Vir Hydroelectric Power Plant
- Zoomba Hydroelectric Power Plant

== See also ==
- Skrad

== Bibliography ==
- Trgo, Fabijan, ed. (1964). Zbornik dokumenata i podataka o Narodno-oslobodilačkom ratu Jugoslovenskih naroda. Vol. V, 32.
