= Novi Lazi =

Novi Lazi may refer to:

- Novi Lazi, Slovenia, a village in Kočevje
- Novi Lazi, Croatia, a village near Brod Moravice
