= Završje, Primorje-Gorski Kotar County =

Završje
- Village
- Interactive map of Završje
- Location within Croatia
- Coordinates: 45°30′N 14°55′E
- Country: Croatia
- County: Primorje-Gorski Kotar County
- Municipality: Brod Moravice

Population (2011)
  - Total: 0
- Time zone: UTC+1 (CET)
  - Summer (DST): UTC+2 (CEST)

Završje is an uninhabited settlement in Croatia.

== History ==
A 22 December 1939 decision as part of agrarian reforms by Ban Šubašić to confiscate the local forest property of the Thurn and Taxis family, Kálmán Ghyczy and Nikola Petrović resulted in a legal dispute known as the Thurn and Taxis Affair, in part because of the relative status of the family and in part because of the proximity to the Italian border.

On 18 July 2023, the wind of a thunderstorm hit the 35/20 KV Kupjak substation, leaving Završje without power.

== Religion ==
Its Catholic parish was founded in 1807, and its parish church was built in 1825. In 1939, its parish had 495 souls. In 1974, its parish had 293 souls, plus 16 outside the country. By 1974, it was administered from Brod Moravice.

List of parish priests of Završje:

- Juraj Prstec (b. Završje 1903-03-30, primiz Bihać 1934-06-29)

== Governance ==
On 1 July 1893, Skrad obćina was divided into Skrad with tax districts Bukov Vrh and Divjake, and Brod-Moravice with tax districts Brod-Moravice and Završje.

== Bibliography ==
- Draganović, Krunoslav (1939-04-20). Opći šematizam Katoličke crkve u Jugoslaviji. Sarajevo: Akademija "Regina Apostolorum".
- Draganović, Krunoslav; Bezić, Srećko [in Croatian]; Crnković, Josip; Lešnik, Rafael; Mršo, Ivan [in Croatian]; Reven, Zdravko [in Slovenian]; Weber, Hinko (1975-05-05). Opći šematizam Katoličke Crkve u Jugoslaviji 1974 [General Directory of the Catholic Church in Yugoslavia 1974] (in Serbo-Croatian). Zagreb: Hrvatsko književno društvo sv. Ćirila i Metoda.
