= Podstene, Brod Moravice =

Podstene
- Village
- Interactive map of Podstene
- Coordinates: 45.479°N 14.921°E
- Country: Croatia
- County: Primorje-Gorski Kotar
- Municipality: Brod Moravice

Area
  - Total: 0.9 km^{2} (0.35 sq mi)

Population (2021)
  - Total: 11
  - Density: 12/km^{2} (32/sq mi)
- Time zone: UTC+1 (CET)
  - Summer (DST): UTC+2 (CEST)

Podstene is a small village in Brod Moravice municipality, Croatia.

== History ==
On 18 July 2023, the wind of a thunderstorm hit the 35/20 KV Kupjak substation, leaving Podstene without power.

== Demographics ==
Village of Podstene: Population trends 1857–2021
v

population	76	64	72	80	57	75	90	89	79	75	56	51	45	32	26	21	11
	1857	1869	1880	1890	1900	1910	1921	1931	1948	1953	1961	1971	1981	1991	2001	2011	2021

Sources: Croatian Bureau of Statistics publications

== Religion ==
Its Catholic parish was founded in 1807, and its parish church was built 1836. In 1939, its parish had 609 souls, plus 25 outside the country. In 1974, its parish had 300 souls, plus 30 outside the country. By 1974 it was administered from Brod Moravice.

List of parish priests of Podstene:

- Administered from Brod Moravice in 1939.

== Bibliography ==
- Draganović, Krunoslav (1939-04-20). Opći šematizam Katoličke crkve u Jugoslaviji. Sarajevo: Akademija "Regina Apostolorum".
- Draganović, Krunoslav; Bezić, Srećko [in Croatian]; Crnković, Josip; Lešnik, Rafael; Mršo, Ivan [in Croatian]; Reven, Zdravko [in Slovenian]; Weber, Hinko (1975-05-05). Opći šematizam Katoličke Crkve u Jugoslaviji 1974 [General Directory of the Catholic Church in Yugoslavia 1974] (in Serbo-Croatian). Zagreb: Hrvatsko književno društvo sv. Ćirila i Metoda.
