= Planica (disambiguation) =

Planica is an alpine valley in northwestern Slovenia known for its ski jumping hills.

Planica may also refer to:

== Places ==
- Planica, Kranj, a village in Slovenia
- Planica, Rače–Fram, a village in Slovenia
- Planica, Croatia, a village near Brod Moravice

== Sport complex ==
- Planica Nordic Center, a Nordic skiing complex in Planica, Slovenia

== Music ==
- Planica, Planica, a 1979 Slovenian song by the Avsenik Brothers Ensemble

== Company ==
- Sladoled Planica, a brand of ice cream produced by the Slovene dairy Ljubljanske Mlekarne
