= Divjake =

Divjake may refer to:

- Divjakë, a town in Albania
- Divjake, Croatia, a village near Skrad
