= Žrnovac =

Settlement in Croatia

- settlement
- Interactive map of Žrnovac
- Location within Croatia
- Coordinates: 45°26′58″N 14°56′24″E
- Country: Croatia
- County: Primorje-Gorski Kotar
- Municipality: Skrad

Area
  - Total: 0.8 km^{2} (0.31 sq mi)

Population (2021)
  - Total: 12
  - Density: 15/km^{2} (39/sq mi)
- Time zone: UTC+1 (CET)
  - Summer (DST): UTC+2 (CEST)
- Postal code: 51300 Delnice

Žrnovac is a settlement in the Municipality of Skrad in Croatia. In 2021, its population was 12.

== Demographics ==
Žrnovac: Population trends 1857–2021
v

population	59	34	72	65	64	54	51	60	54	55	58	49	35	25	25	20	12
	1857	1869	1880	1890	1900	1910	1921	1931	1948	1953	1961	1971	1981	1991	2001	2011	2021

Sources: Croatian Bureau of Statistics publications

== Sports ==
Beginning in 2013, the 7 stage 260 kilometres (160 mi) long Cycling Trail of Gorski Kotar (Croatian: Goranska biciklistička transverzala) passes through Žrnovac.
