= Seltsi =

Seltsi may refer to:

- Selckë, a village near Gjirokastër, Albania
- Seltsi, Bulgaria, a village near Sadovo, Bulgaria

== See also ==
- Selci (disambiguation)
