= Seoce =

Seoce (Cyrillic: Сеоце), which translates as villages from Serbo-Croatian, may refer to:

- Seoce, Serbia, a village near Kuršumlija, Serbia
- Seoce (Breza), a village near Breza, Bosnia and Herzegovina
- Seoce (Kakanj), a village near Kakanj, Bosnia and Herzegovina
- Seoce, Croatia, a village near Nova Kapela

== See also ==
- Seoca (disambiguation) (Cyrl: Селце)
- Selce (disambiguation) (Cyrl: Селце)
- Selca (disambiguation) (Cyrl: Селце)
