= Ozalj Hydroelectric Power Plant =

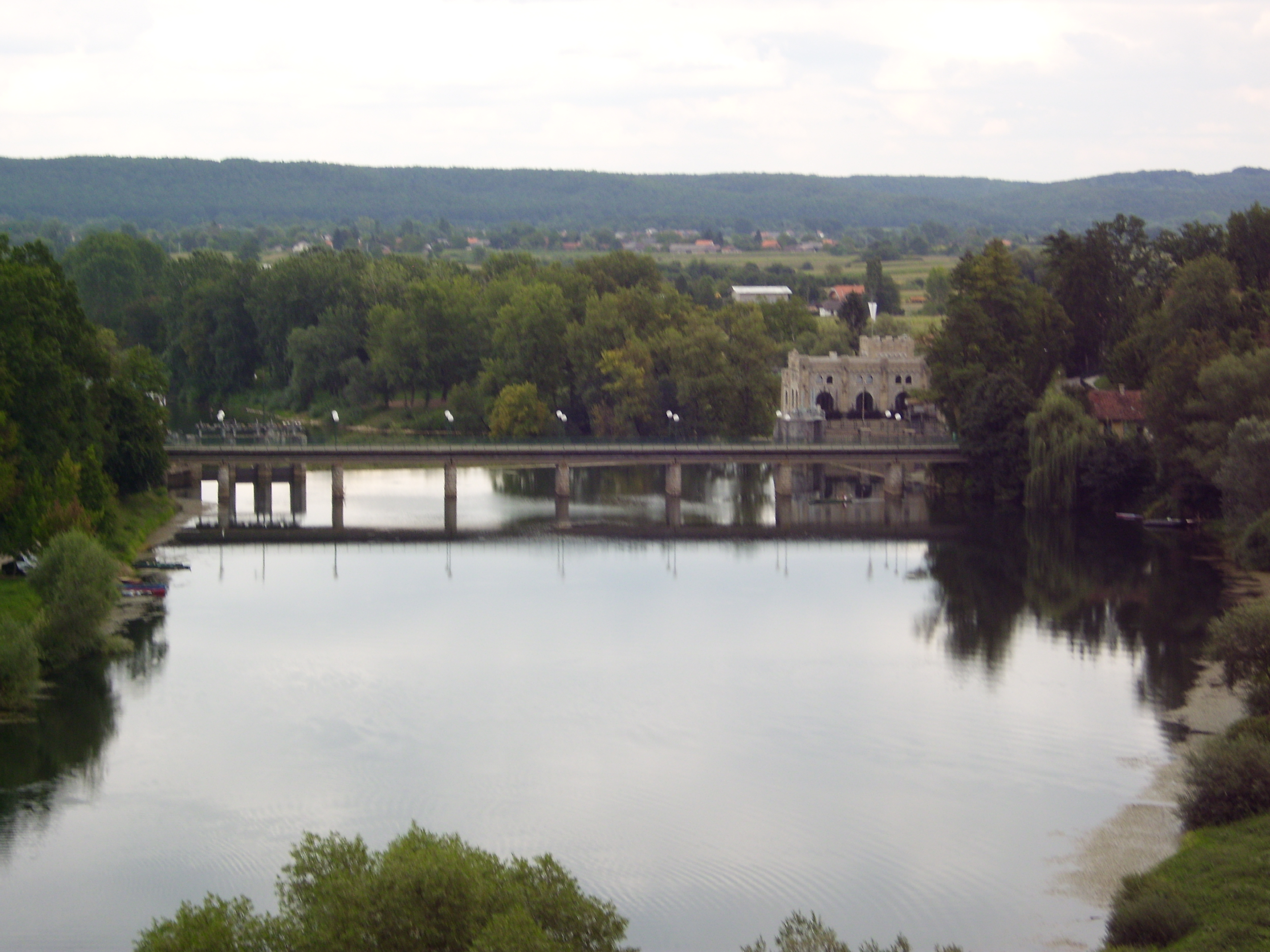
- Country: Croatia
- Coordinates: 45°36′52″N 15°28′40″E

External links
- Commons: Related media on Commons

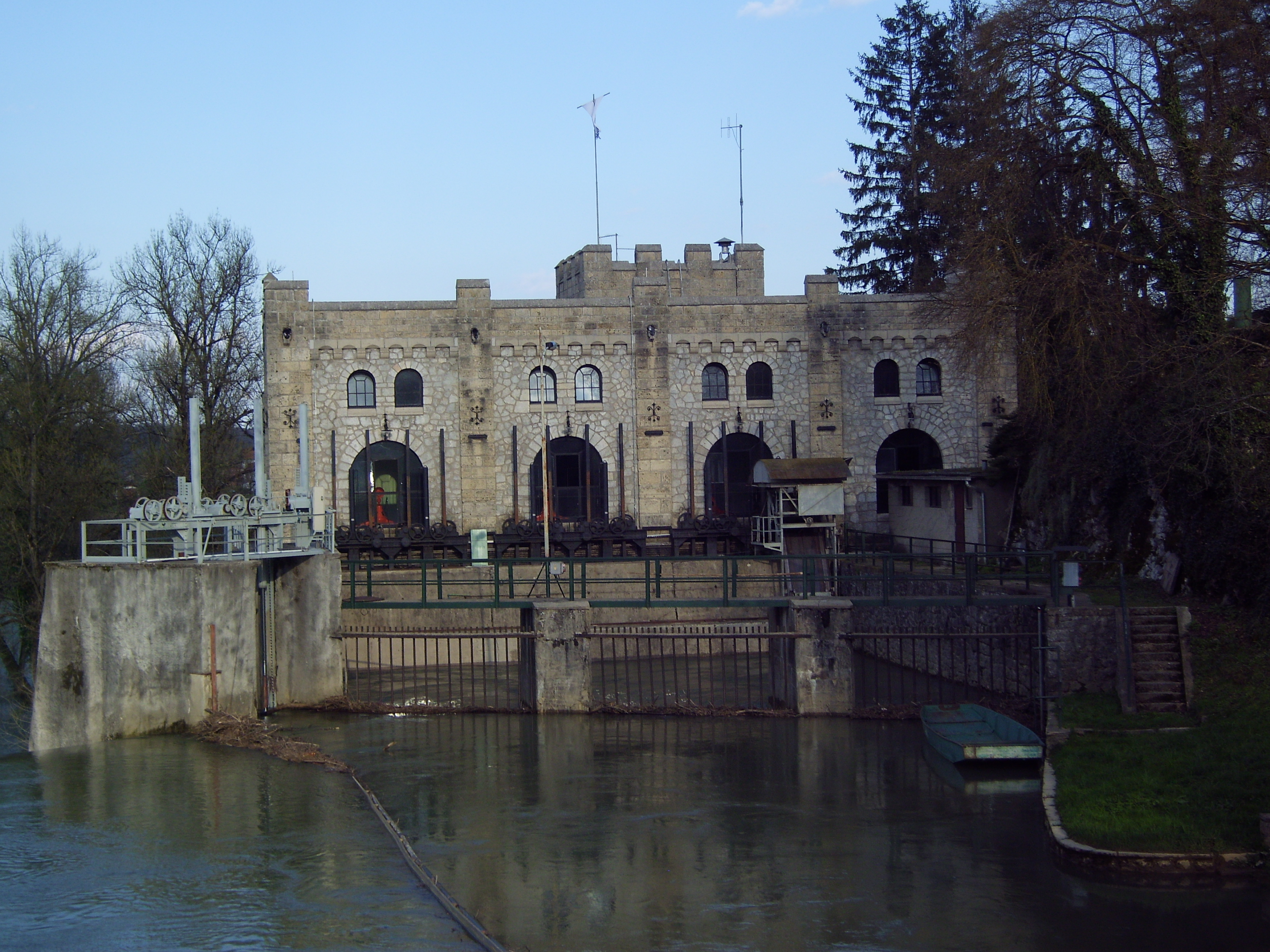
The Ozalj I Hydroelectric Power Plant was built in 1908.

Ozalj Hydroelectric Power Plant is a hydroelectric power plant on river Kupa, in its central stretch, in town of Ozalj, Karlovac County, Croatia.

The Ozalj Hydroelectric Power Plant is run-of-the-river plant on the Kupa River central stretch. The Ozalj plant consist of two separate hydroelectric power plants, Ozalj 1 (located on the right bank of the Kupa River) and Ozalj 2 (located on the left bank of the Kupa River). Ozalj 1 was built in 1908, as the first larger power plant in the continental part of Croatia, and the power was used for street lighting in the city of Karlovac.

It is operated by Hrvatska elektroprivreda.

== The Kupa River catchment hydroelectric power plants ==
- Ozalj Hydroelectric Power Plant
- Gojak Hydroelectric Power Plant
- Lešće Hydroelectric Power Plant
- Zeleni Vir Hydroelectric Power Plant

== See also ==
- Kupa
- Ozalj
