= Doluš =

- Village
- Location within Croatia
- Coordinates: 45°30′N 14°54′E
- Country: Croatia
- County: Primorje-Gorski Kotar
- Municipality: Brod Moravice

Area
  - Total: 1.1 km^{2} (0.42 sq mi)

Population (2021)
  - Total: 5
  - Density: 4.5/km^{2} (12/sq mi)
- Time zone: UTC+1 (CET)
  - Summer (DST): UTC+2 (CEST)

Doluš is an uninhabited settlement in Croatia, located in the municipality of Brod Moravice, Primorje-Gorski Kotar County.
