= Selca =

Selca may refer to:

== Geography ==
=== Croatia ===
- Selca, Brač, a municipality on the island of Brač, Croatia
- Selca, Istria County, a village in the municipality of Buzet, Croatia
- Selca kod Bogomolja, a village on the island of Hvar, Croatia, and an Italian exonym in Dalmatia
- Selca kod Starog Grada, a village on the island of Hvar, Croatia

=== Slovenia ===
- Selca, Železniki, Slovenia
- Selca Valley, Slovenia, including the town of Železniki
- Selca Sora river, a source of the Sora (river) river, western Slovenia

== Linguistics ==
- Selca dialect, a Slovene dialect

== Biology ==
- Selca (moth), a genus of moths in subfamily Nolinae

== See also ==
- Selce (disambiguation)
- Selci (disambiguation)
- Seoca (disambiguation)
- Seoce (disambiguation)
