= Gojak Hydroelectric Power Plant =

- Country: Croatia
- Coordinates: 45°17′56″N 15°15′48″E

Power generation
- Nameplate capacity: 55.5 MW

Gojak Hydroelectric Power Plant is a hydroelectric power plant on river Dobra, near the town of Ogulin, in Karlovac County, Croatia. Its total capacity is 55.5 MW.

The Gojak Hydroelectric Power Plant is a high pressure diversion plant which harnesses the river power of the Ogulinska Dobra and Zagorska Mrežnica rivers. It is operated by the Croatian state-owned electrical company, Hrvatska elektroprivreda. Another lake is formed by the river Dobra just before it plunges into Đula's abyss. Namely, somewhere around one kilometer away from the center of Ogulin, a dam was built on the river Dobra, and in this way another artificial lake, Bukovnik, was created. From that lake, water is drained through channels up to 30 kilometers long to the Gojak Hydroelectric Power Station, where we use it to obtain electricity.

== The Kupa River catchment hydroelectric power plants ==
- Ozalj Hydroelectric Power Plant
- Gojak Hydroelectric Power Plant
- Lešće Hydroelectric Power Plant
- Zeleni Vir Hydroelectric Power Plant

== See also ==
- Kupa
