= Hlevci =

Settlement in Croatia

- settlement
- Interactive map of Hlevci
- Location within Croatia
- Coordinates: 45°23′44″N 14°55′44″E
- Country: Croatia
- County: Primorje-Gorski Kotar
- Municipality: Skrad

Area
  - Total: 4.6 km^{2} (1.8 sq mi)

Population (2021)
  - Total: 18
  - Density: 3.9/km^{2} (10/sq mi)
- Time zone: UTC+1 (CET)
  - Summer (DST): UTC+2 (CEST)
- Postal code: 51300 Delnice

Hlevci is a settlement in the Municipality of Skrad in Croatia. In 2021, its population was 18.

== Demographics ==
Hlevci: Population trends 1857–2021
v

population				57	46	52	46	39	34	37	35	42	32	23	19	17	18
	1857	1869	1880	1890	1900	1910	1921	1931	1948	1953	1961	1971	1981	1991	2001	2011	2021

Note:Under Kupjak from 1857 to 1880. Sources: Croatian Bureau of Statistics publications

== Sports ==
The "Gorski Kotar Bike Tour", held annually since 2012, sometimes goes through Hlevci, such as in the third leg for 2023.
