= Planina Skradska =

Settlement in Croatia

- settlement
- Interactive map of Planina Skradska
- Location within Croatia
- Coordinates: 45°26′21″N 14°53′53″E
- Country: Croatia
- County: Primorje-Gorski Kotar
- Municipality: Skrad

Area
  - Total: 1.2 km^{2} (0.46 sq mi)

Population (2021)
  - Total: 27
  - Density: 22/km^{2} (58/sq mi)
- Time zone: UTC+1 (CET)
  - Summer (DST): UTC+2 (CEST)
- Postal code: 51300 Delnice

Planina Skradska is a settlement in the Municipality of Skrad in Croatia. In 2021, its population was 27.

== Demographics ==
Planina Skradska: Population trends 1857–2021
v

population	47	54	57	65	61	90	82	84	91	89	96	88	78	63	52	39	27
	1857	1869	1880	1890	1900	1910	1921	1931	1948	1953	1961	1971	1981	1991	2001	2011	2021

Sources: Croatian Bureau of Statistics publications
