= Moravička Sela =

- Village
- Interactive map of Moravička Sela
- Coordinates: 45.470°N 14.952°E
- Country: Croatia
- County: Primorje-Gorski Kotar
- Municipality: Brod Moravice

Area
  - Total: 2.4 km^{2} (0.93 sq mi)

Population (2021)
  - Total: 37
  - Density: 15/km^{2} (40/sq mi)
- Time zone: UTC+1 (CET)
  - Summer (DST): UTC+2 (CEST)

Moravička Sela is a small village in Brod Moravice municipality, Croatia.

== History ==
On 18 July 2023, the wind of a thunderstorm hit the 35/20 KV Kupjak substation, leaving Moravička Sela without power.

== Demographics ==
Village of Moravička Sela: Population trends 1857–2021
v

population	144	154	149	144	135	130	98	128	116	108	115	87	80	78	50	51	37
	1857	1869	1880	1890	1900	1910	1921	1931	1948	1953	1961	1971	1981	1991	2001	2011	2021

Note:"Sela" until 1900. Sources: Croatian Bureau of Statistics publications
