= Velike Drage =

Settlement in Primorje-Gorski Kotar County, Croatia

Velike Drage Vele Drage
- Settlement
- Interactive map of Velike Drage
- Location of Velike Drage in Croatia
- Coordinates: 45°28′12″N 14°59′56″E
- Country: Croatia
- County: Primorje-Gorski Kotar
- Municipality: Brod Moravice

Area
  - Total: 5.3 km^{2} (2.0 sq mi)

Population (2021)
  - Total: 20
  - Density: 3.8/km^{2} (9.8/sq mi)
- Time zone: UTC+1 (CET)
  - Summer (DST): UTC+2 (CEST)
- Postal code: 51326 Vrbovsko
- Area code: +385 (0)51

Velike Drage, also called Vele Drage, is a settlement in the Municipality of Brod Moravice in Croatia. In 2021, its population was 20.

== Demographics ==
Village of Vele Drage: Population trends 1857–2021
v

population	170	200	179	157	148	147	148	162	144	133	134	107	79	53	40	28	20
	1857	1869	1880	1890	1900	1910	1921	1931	1948	1953	1961	1971	1981	1991	2001	2011	2021

Sources: Croatian Bureau of Statistics publications

== Sports ==
Beginning in 2013, the 7 stage 260 kilometres (160 mi) long Cycling Trail of Gorski Kotar (Croatian: Goranska biciklistička transverzala) passes through Vele Drage.
