= Čučak =

- Village
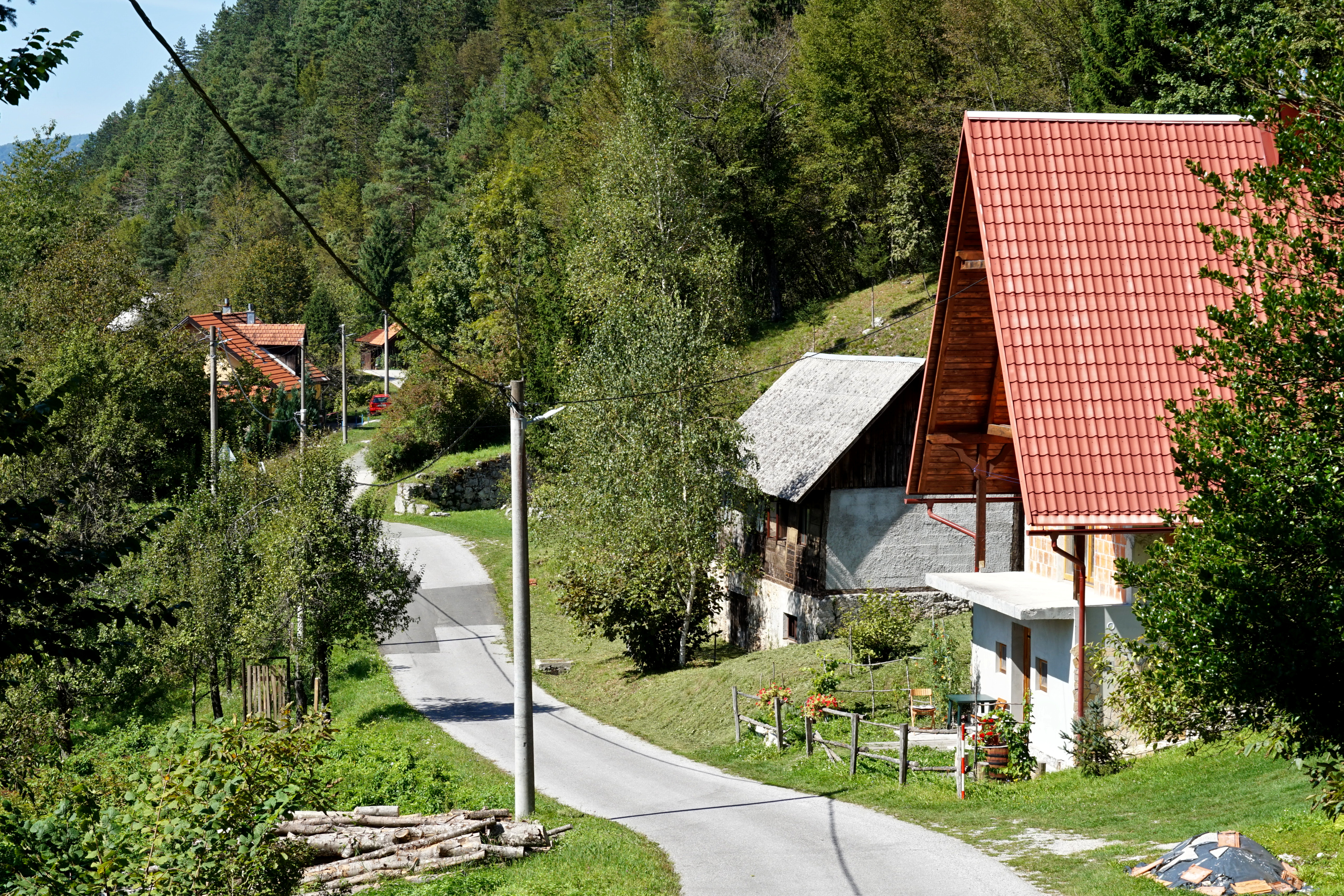
- Villagey road cutting through Čučak, countryside Croatia.
- Interactive map of Čučak
- Coordinates: 45.467°N 14.942°E
- Country: Croatia
- County: Primorje-Gorski Kotar
- Municipality: Brod Moravice

Area
  - Total: 1.2 km^{2} (0.46 sq mi)

Population (2021)
  - Total: 5
  - Density: 4.2/km^{2} (11/sq mi)
- Time zone: UTC+1 (CET)
  - Summer (DST): UTC+2 (CEST)

Čučak is a small village in Brod Moravice municipality, Croatia.

== Demographics ==
Village of Čučak: Population trends 1857–2021
v

population	54	61	69	68	58	60	59	43	44	41	37	39	19	13	7	10	5
	1857	1869	1880	1890	1900	1910	1921	1931	1948	1953	1961	1971	1981	1991	2001	2011	2021

Sources: Croatian Bureau of Statistics publications

== Bibliography ==
=== Biology ===
- Šašić, Martina; Nahirnić, Ana; Tarmann, Gerhard M. (2016-12-31). "Zygaenidae (Lepidoptera) in the Lepidoptera collections of the Croatian Natural History Museum". Natura Croatica: Periodicum Musei Historiae Naturalis Croatici. 25 (2): 233–248. doi:10.20302/NC.2016.25.19. eISSN 1848-7386.
