= Divjake, Croatia =

Settlement in Croatia

Divjake
- settlement
- Interactive map of Divjake
- Location within Croatia
- Coordinates: 45°25′21″N 14°55′56″E
- Country: Croatia
- County: Primorje-Gorski Kotar
- Municipality: Skrad

Area
  - Total: 0.7 km^{2} (0.27 sq mi)

Population (2021)
  - Total: 28
  - Density: 40/km^{2} (100/sq mi)
- Time zone: UTC+1 (CET)
  - Summer (DST): UTC+2 (CEST)
- Postal code: 51300 Delnice

Divjake is a settlement in the Municipality of Skrad in Croatia. In 2021, its population was 28.

== History ==
A 22 December 1939 decision as part of agrarian reforms by Ban Šubašić to confiscate the local forest property of the Thurn and Taxis family, Kálmán Ghyczy and Nikola Petrović resulted in a legal dispute known as the Thurn and Taxis Affair, in part because of the relative status of the family and in part because of the proximity to the Italian border.

== Demographics ==
Divjake: Population trends 1857–2021
v

population	102	91	74	82	69	74	91	83	78	85	81	61	54	44	47	40	28
	1857	1869	1880	1890	1900	1910	1921	1931	1948	1953	1961	1971	1981	1991	2001	2011	2021

Sources: Croatian Bureau of Statistics publications

== Religion ==
Its Catholic parish was founded in 1807, and its parish church was built in 1829. In 1939, its parish had 2142 souls, plus 250 outside the country. By 1974, its parish had 2010 souls, plus 60 outside the country.

List of parish priests of Divjake:

- Rude Miloš (b. Zlobin 1883-04-07, primiz Sušak 1908-07-05)
- ...
- Antun Čubranić (b. Baška Draga 1937-10-17, primiz Punat 1962-07-08)

== Governance ==
On 1 July 1893, Skrad obćina was divided into Skrad with tax districts Bukov Vrh and Divjake, and Brod-Moravice with tax districts Brod-Moravice and Završje.

== Sports ==
Beginning in 2013, the 7 stage 260 kilometres (160 mi) long Cycling Trail of Gorski Kotar (Croatian: Goranska biciklistička transverzala) passes through Divjake.

The "Gorski Kotar Bike Tour", held annually since 2012, sometimes goes through Divjake, such as in the third leg for 2023.

== Bibliography ==
- OONF PGO (1945-03-19). "Svećenstvo Gorskog Kotara pristupa JNOf-i". Primorski vjesnik: Glasilo jedinstvene Narodno-oslobodilačke fronte Hrvatskog primorja (in Serbo-Croatian). No. 144. p. 4.
- Draganović, Krunoslav (1939-04-20). Opći šematizam Katoličke crkve u Jugoslaviji. Sarajevo: Akademija "Regina Apostolorum".
- Draganović, Krunoslav; Bezić, Srećko [in Croatian]; Crnković, Josip; Lešnik, Rafael; Mršo, Ivan [in Croatian]; Reven, Zdravko [in Slovenian]; Weber, Hinko (1975-05-05). Opći šematizam Katoličke Crkve u Jugoslaviji 1974 [General Directory of the Catholic Church in Yugoslavia 1974] (in Serbo-Croatian). Zagreb: Hrvatsko književno društvo sv. Ćirila i Metoda.
- Prusac, Stjepan (2023-09-26) [defended 2023-09-25]. Posjedi obitelji Thurn Taxis nakon 1918. godine [Thurn Taxis Estates in Croatia after First World War] (Thesis) (in Croatian). Zagreb: Filozofski fakultet Sveučilišta u Zagrebu.
- Banska vlast Banovine Hrvatske (1940b). "Gospodarska prosvjeta i banovinska dobra". Godišnjak banske vlasti Banovine Hrvatske. Vol. 1. pp. 89–96.
