= Šepci Podstenski =

Settlement in Primorje-Gorski Kotar County, Croatia

- Settlement
- Interactive map of Šepci Podstenski
- Location of Šepci Podstenski in Croatia
- Coordinates: 45°28′28″N 14°55′28″E
- Country: Croatia
- County: Primorje-Gorski Kotar
- Municipality: Brod Moravice

Area
  - Total: 0.7 km^{2} (0.27 sq mi)

Population (2021)
  - Total: 4
  - Density: 5.7/km^{2} (15/sq mi)
- Time zone: UTC+1 (CET)
  - Summer (DST): UTC+2 (CEST)
- Postal code: 51326 Vrbovsko

Šepci Podstenski is a settlement in the Municipality of Brod Moravice in Croatia. In 2021, its population was 4.

== Demographics ==
Šepci Podstenski: Population trends 1857–2021
v

population	44	36	32	34	25	23	21	23	23	28	21	24	17	9	3	2	4
	1857	1869	1880	1890	1900	1910	1921	1931	1948	1953	1961	1971	1981	1991	2001	2011	2021

Sources: Croatian Bureau of Statistics publications
