= Tusti Vrh =

Settlement in Croatia

- settlement
- Interactive map of Tusti Vrh
- Location within Croatia
- Coordinates: 45°26′26″N 14°54′38″E
- Country: Croatia
- County: Primorje-Gorski Kotar
- Municipality: Skrad

Area
  - Total: 2.1 km^{2} (0.81 sq mi)

Population (2021)
  - Total: 16
  - Density: 7.6/km^{2} (20/sq mi)
- Time zone: UTC+1 (CET)
  - Summer (DST): UTC+2 (CEST)
- Postal code: 51300 Delnice

Tusti Vrh is a settlement in the Municipality of Skrad in Croatia. In 2021, its population was 16.

== Demographics ==
Tusti Vrh: Population trends 1857–2021
v

population	45	41	35	49	56	55	47	45	44	45	40	36	33	24	24	18	16
	1857	1869	1880	1890	1900	1910	1921	1931	1948	1953	1961	1971	1981	1991	2001	2011	2021

Sources: Croatian Bureau of Statistics publications
