= Kocijani =

Settlement in Primorje-Gorski Kotar County, Croatia

- Settlement
- Interactive map of Kocijani
- Location of Kocijani in Croatia
- Coordinates: 45°28′58″N 14°55′10″E
- Country: Croatia
- County: Primorje-Gorski Kotar
- Municipality: Brod Moravice

Area
  - Total: 0.8 km^{2} (0.31 sq mi)

Population (2021)
  - Total: 5
  - Density: 6.2/km^{2} (16/sq mi)
- Time zone: UTC+1 (CET)
  - Summer (DST): UTC+2 (CEST)
- Postal code: 51326 Vrbovsko

Kocijani is a settlement in the Municipality of Brod Moravice in Croatia. In 2021, its population was 5.

== Demographics ==
Kocijani: Population trends 1857–2021
v

population	83	79	76	65	75	84	77	68	59	60	52	38	25	21	14	10	5
	1857	1869	1880	1890	1900	1910	1921	1931	1948	1953	1961	1971	1981	1991	2001	2011	2021

Sources: Croatian Bureau of Statistics publications
