= Seltse =

Seltse (Cyrillic: Селце) may refer to several localities in Bulgaria:

- Seltse, Dobrich Province
- Seltse, Lovech Province
- Seltse, Stara Zagora Province

== See also ==
- Selce (disambiguation) (Cyrillic: Селце)
