= Šimatovo =

- Village
- Location within Croatia
- Coordinates: 45.505204°N 14.505204°E
- Country: Croatia
- County: Primorje-Gorski Kotar
- Municipality: Brod Moravice

Area
  - Total: 1.1 km^{2} (0.42 sq mi)

Population (2021)
  - Total: 1
  - Density: 0.91/km^{2} (2.4/sq mi)
- Time zone: UTC+1 (CET)
  - Summer (DST): UTC+2 (CEST)

Šimatovo is a village in Croatia, in the municipality of Brod Moravice.

== History ==
On 18 July 2023, the wind of a thunderstorm hit the 35/20 KV Kupjak substation, leaving Goršeti without power.

== Attractions ==
The 422 metres (1,385 ft) long Kalvarija park dates to the 19th century.

== Demographics ==
Village of Šimatovo: Population trends 1857–2021
v

population	30	36	46	58	51	47	48	70	46	45	30	22	10	13	5	3	1
	1857	1869	1880	1890	1900	1910	1921	1931	1948	1953	1961	1971	1981	1991	2001	2011	2021

Note:Od 1857. do 1921. dio podataka sadržan je u naselju Završje. Sources: Croatian Bureau of Statistics publications
