= Selci =

Selci may refer to:

- Selci, Italy, a municipality in Rieti, Lazio
- Selci, Struga, a village in North Macedonia
- Selci, Bizovac, a village near Bizovac, Osijek-Baranja County, Croatia
- Selci Đakovački, a village in Osijek-Baranja County, Croatia
- Selci Križovljanski, a village near Cestica, Varaždin County, Croatia

== See also ==
- Seltsi (disambiguation)
- Selca (disambiguation)
- Selce (disambiguation)
