= Delači =

Settlement in Primorje-Gorski Kotar County, Croatia

- Settlement
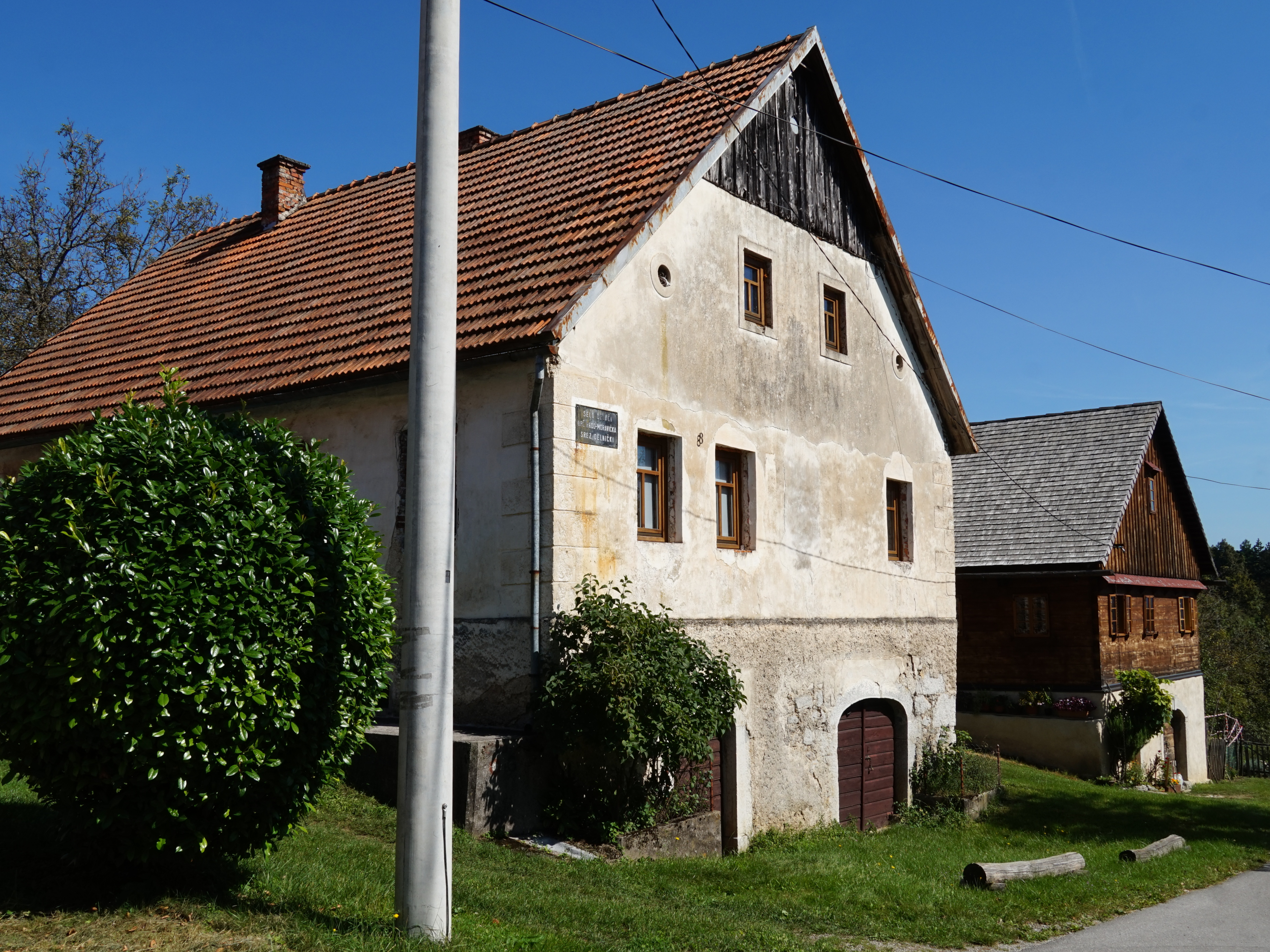
- Interactive map of Delači
- Location of Delači in Croatia
- Coordinates: 45°28′17″N 14°57′32″E
- Country: Croatia
- County: Primorje-Gorski Kotar
- Municipality: Brod Moravice

Area
  - Total: 1.4 km^{2} (0.54 sq mi)

Population (2021)
  - Total: 9
  - Density: 6.4/km^{2} (17/sq mi)
- Time zone: UTC+1 (CET)
  - Summer (DST): UTC+2 (CEST)
- Postal code: 51326 Vrbovsko

Delači is a settlement in the Municipality of Brod Moravice in Croatia. In 2021, its population was 9.

== Demographics ==
Delači: Population trends 1857–2021
v

population	75	98	134	144	52	60	54	46	38	56	53	40	33	32	35	15	9
	1857	1869	1880	1890	1900	1910	1921	1931	1948	1953	1961	1971	1981	1991	2001	2011	2021

Sources: Croatian Bureau of Statistics publications
