= Zahrt =

- Village
- Interactive map of Zahrt
- Coordinates: 45.470°N 14.932°E
- Country: Croatia
- County: Primorje-Gorski Kotar
- Municipality: Brod Moravice

Area
  - Total: 0.6 km^{2} (0.23 sq mi)

Population (2021)
  - Total: 3
  - Density: 5.0/km^{2} (13/sq mi)
- Time zone: UTC+1 (CET)
  - Summer (DST): UTC+2 (CEST)

Zahrt is a small village in Brod Moravice municipality, Croatia.

== Demographics ==
Village of Zahrt: Population trends 1857–2021
v

population	41	38	34	28	24	19	34	47	32	32	27	26	16	5	3	5	3
	1857	1869	1880	1890	1900	1910	1921	1931	1948	1953	1961	1971	1981	1991	2001	2011	2021

Sources: Croatian Bureau of Statistics publications

== Sports ==
Beginning in 2013, the 7 stage 260 kilometres (160 mi) long Cycling Trail of Gorski Kotar (Croatian: Goranska biciklistička transverzala) passes through Zahrt.
