= Donja Dobra =

- Village
- Location within Croatia
- Coordinates: 45.453809°N 14.977026°E
- Country: Croatia
- Region: Gorski Kotar
- County: Primorje-Gorski Kotar County
- Municipality: Brod Moravice

Area
  - Total: 1.8 sq mi (4.6 km^{2})
- Elevation: 1,529 ft (466 m)

Population (2021)
  - Total: 193
  - Density: 110/sq mi (42/km^{2})
- Time zone: UTC+1 (CET)
  - Summer (DST): UTC+2 (CEST)
- Postal code: 51312
- Area code: 051

Donja Dobra is a village in the Gorski Kotar region of Croatia. The settlement is administered as a part of Brod Moravice municipality and the Primorje-Gorski Kotar County. According to the 2001 census the village has 190 inhabitants. It is connected by the D3 state road.

== History ==
In 1860–1879, Matija Mažuranić wrote a 62 folio manuscript today titled Writings on the Building of Roads in Gorski Kotar and Lika (Croatian: Spisi o gradnji cesta u Gorskom Kotaru i Lici), today with signature HR-ZaNSK R 6424. A 21 folio manuscript dated 1872 titled Darstellung der Entstehung des Baues ... der Luisenstrasse together with a translation by I. Mikloušić is kept as HR-ZaNSK R 4572.

On 28 April 2012 after 17:00, a fire burned 15 hectares (37 acres) in the forest along the railway between Moravice and Brod Moravice.

On 12 December 2017, a severe wind hit Donja Dobra, blocking traffic to and from it.

== Notable people ==
Notable people that were born or lived in Donja Dobra include:

- Lydia Sklevicky (7 May 1952 – 21 January 1990)
