= Skrad =

Skrad Skrad u Dobri, Skrad u Dobrih
- Municipality
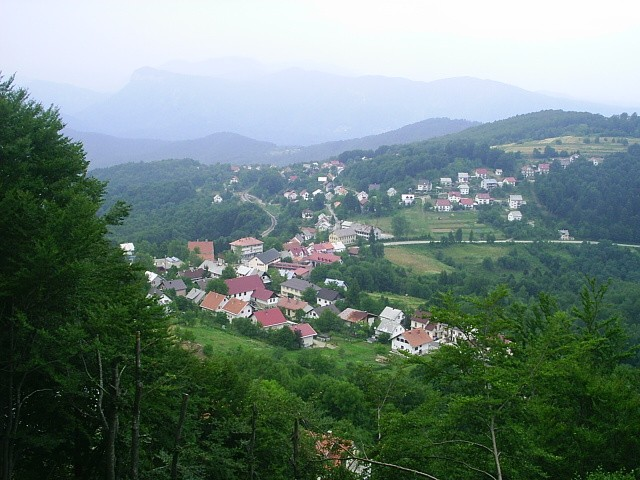
- View of Skrad.

- Location of Skrad within Croatia
- Coordinates: 45°25′40.08″N 14°54′39.96″E
- Country: Croatia
- County: Primorje-Gorski Kotar County

Area
  - Municipality: 52.7 km^{2} (20.3 sq mi)
  - Urban: 3.0 km^{2} (1.2 sq mi)

Population (2021)
  - Municipality: 858
  - Density: 16.3/km^{2} (42.2/sq mi)
  - Urban: 568
  - Urban density: 190/km^{2} (490/sq mi)
- Website: skrad.hr

Skrad is a village and a municipality in the Primorje-Gorski Kotar County in western Croatia.

== History ==
Skrad was first mentioned on 22 February 1481 in a document freeing the citizens of Grič from tariffs in Skrad and elsewhere, unless the other Skrad was intended.

In 1860–1879, Matija Mažuranić wrote a 62 folio manuscript today titled Writings on the Building of Roads in Gorski Kotar and Lika (Croatian: Spisi o gradnji cesta u Gorskom Kotaru i Lici), today with signature HR-ZaNSK R 6424. A 21 folio manuscript dated 1872 titled Darstellung der Entstehung des Baues ... der Luisenstrasse togethr with a translation by I. Mikloušić is kept as HR-ZaNSK R 4572.

After the Lujzijana was built, the Družtvo lujzinske ceste constructed an inn in Skrad together with stables and an aqueduct. In 1874, the society would sell all its assets along the road, including those in Skrad.

=== Kingdom of Yugoslavia ===
The volunteer fire department DVD Skrad was founded on 1 March 1932, and is today part of the Požarno područje Gorski kotar IV. Its current commander is Davor Štimac.

The local chapter of the HPS is HPD "Skradski Vrh", which had 21 members in 1936 under the Josip Lončarić presidency. No data was shared for 1937. Membership fell to 13 in 1938 under the Vinko Janeš presidency. Membership remained at 13 in 1939 under the Josip Žagar presidency.

Since the inclusion of Ski jumping at the 1924 Winter Olympics, the sport grew in popularity. In 1934, a ski jump was opened below Skradski Vrh for jumps up to 28 metres (92 ft). The project was headed by J. Lončarić, the ski jump designed by a Norwegian engineer and built by the local "Skradski Vrh" Cooperation on two parcels of land. It was the first ski jump on the territory of the ZZSP. Though in 1935, Delnice would build its own. The ski jump was opened in 1939.

=== WWII ===
In October 1941, the Minister of Sport and Mountaineering of the NDH, Miško Zebić, named Josip Žagar as the state povjerenik of the HPD "Skradski Vrh", and designated as the chapter's advisory board: Juraj Jugović, Stjepan Rauh, Vinko Janeš, Andrija Rački, Josip Grgurić and Milan Štimac. The HPD "Skradski Vrh" was officially renamed Hrvatsko planinarsko društvo u Skradu in March 1942, but Gospić did not reply to the order.

The Domobrani had a hospital here during the war. On 29 July 1942, Partisans attacked the hospital, but the attack was repelled by the Domobrani.

At 19:00 on 11 September, a group of around 1000 Partisans attacked a guard stationed at the power plant consisting of 20 Domobrans of the 25th company of the 3rd Regiment of the Second Division, capturing the plant and blowing it up with explosives, leaving Brod Moravice, Delnice and Skrad without electricity.

=== Recent ===
From 31 January to 2 February 2014, while S and SW geostrophic wind dominated, freezing rain fell on Gorski Kotar, glazing the entire region. It wrecked roofs, power lines and forests, causing power loss for about 14,000 households in Gorski Kotar, or about 80% of its population. It took about 10 days to restore essential infrastructure to the region, and within months electricity was back in most of its former range, but at a cost of about 84.4 million HRK to HEP. At the time it was the largest peacetime damage since its Secession from Yugoslavia, even without counting the forestry losses. The Šumarija Skrad lost 2% of its wood mass. Clearing blocked forestry roads and forest paths would take years, and thanks to the declining population some were never cleared.

On 12 December 2017, a severe wind hit Skrad, blocking traffic to and from it along the Kupjak-Stubica road.

== Climate ==
From 1960 to 1993, the highest temperature recorded at the local weather station was 33.7 °C (92.7 °F), on 28 July 1983. The coldest temperature was −19.8 °C (−3.6 °F), on 8 January 1985.

Climate data for Skrad (1981–1993)
Month	Jan	Feb	Mar	Apr	May	Jun	Jul	Aug	Sep	Oct	Nov	Dec	Year
Average snowfall cm (inches)	48 (19)	52 (20)	40 (16)	38 (15)	16 (6.3)	0 (0)	0 (0)	0 (0)	0 (0)	13 (5.1)	50 (20)	36 (14)	293 (115)
Average extreme snow depth cm (inches)	96 (38)	104 (41)	135 (53)	50 (20)	16 (6.3)	0 (0)	0 (0)	0 (0)	0 (0)	13 (5.1)	56 (22)	52 (20)	135 (53)
Average snowy days	7.0	7.9	5.9	2.2	0.2	0	0	0	0	0.4	2.8	6.8	33.2

== Demographics ==
In 1870, Skrad općina, in Delnice podžupanija, had 906 houses, with a population of 6107 (largest in the podžupanija). Its 60 villages were divided into 5 porezne obćine (Divjake, Bukov Vrh, Brod Moravice, Završje, Komorske Moravice) for taxation purposes. Parishes included Divjake, Brod Moravice, Završje and the Eastern Orthodox parish of Komorske Moravice.

In 1895, the obćina of Skrad (court at Skrad), with an area of 51 square kilometres (20 mi^{2}), belonged to the kotar of Delnice (Delnice court and electoral district) in the županija of Modruš-Rieka (Ogulin court and financial board). There were 337 houses, with a population of 2048. Its 25 villages and 1 hamlet were divided for taxation purposes into 2 porezne obćine, under the Delnice office.

In the 2011 census, there were 1,062 inhabitants, in the following settlements:

- Belski Ravan, population 0
- Brezje Dobransko, population 2
- Bukov Vrh, population 27 ▼
- Bukovac Podvrški, population 0
- Buzin, population 1 ▼
- Divjake, population 28 ▼
- Gorani, population 0
- Gorica Skradska, population 2 ▼
- Gornja Dobra, population 38 ▼
- Gramalj, population 0
- Hlevci, population 17 ▲
- Hosnik, population 0 ▼
- Hribac, population 17 ▼
- Mala Dobra, population 0
- Malo Selce, population 11 ▼
- Pećišće, population 0 ▼
- Planina Skradska, population 27 ▼
- Podslemeni Lazi, population 0 ▼
- Podstena, population 11 ▼
- Pucak, population 1
- Raskrižje, population 0
- Rasohe, population 0 ▼
- Resnatac, population 0
- Rogi, population 7 ▼
- Skrad, population 568 ▼
- Sleme Skradsko, population 1 ▼
- Trški Lazi, population 0
- Tusti Vrh, population 16 ▼
- Veliko Selce, population 70 ▼
- Vrh Brodski, population 0
- Zakrajc Brodski, population 1
- Žrnovac, population 12 ▼

In the same census, 97% were Croats.

Municipality of Skrad: Population trends 1857–2021
v

population	1834	1733	1763	1747	1778	1962	1901	1962	2002	2026	2039	2021	1759	1549	1333	1062	858
	1857	1869	1880	1890	1900	1910	1921	1931	1948	1953	1961	1971	1981	1991	2001	2011	2021

Note:Split from the old Delnice općina. Part of its population was listed under Ravna Gora from 1857 to 1880. Sources: Croatian Bureau of Statistics publications
Town of Skrad: Population trends 1857–2021
v

population	217	256	289	259	319	335	400	406	448	509	598	818	873	885	836	694	568
	1857	1869	1880	1890	1900	1910	1921	1931	1948	1953	1961	1971	1981	1991	2001	2011	2021

Sources: Croatian Bureau of Statistics publications

== Governance ==
=== National ===
At the 1920 Kingdom of Serbs, Croats and Slovenes Constitutional Assembly election in Modruš-Rijeka County, Skrad voted mainly for the Croatian People's Peasant Party and to a lesser extent the Communist Party.

Results at the poll in Skrad
Year	Voters	Electors	NRS	DSD	KPJ	HPSS	Independent	SS	HSP	HZ
1920	712	370 (Note: One ball missing at the count.)		15	84	230	13		2	25

=== Municipal ===
On 1 July 1893, Skrad obćina was divided into Skrad with tax districts Bukov Vrh and Divjake, and Brod-Moravice with tax districts Brod-Moravice and Završje.

=== Judiciary ===
In 1875, the kotar court of Delnice encompassed a population of 28,347, being responsible for the općine: Delnice, Lokve, Fužine, Mrkopalj, Ravna Gora, Brod, Skrad, Vrbovsko.

== Attractions ==
The 4,536 metres (14,882 ft) Perivoj mladih garden was planted in 1920.

== Vražji prolaz ==
Vražji prolaz/Zeleni vir has been protected since 1962.

The 800 metres (2,600 ft) path along Vražji prolaz/Zeleni vir was built in the 1930s and 1960s.

== Sports ==
=== Bowling ===
Skrad is home to the bowling club Skrad, which meets at the Kuglana Zeleni Vir. The best bowlers of Skrad have competed in the 2nd League, and the local individual record at the bowling alley is 637, set in 2008 by Bore Juričević.

=== Cycling ===
Beginning in 2013, the 7 stage 260 kilometres (160 mi) long Cycling Trail of Gorski Kotar (Croatian: Goranska biciklistička transverzala) passes through Skrad, where the second stage ends.

The "Gorski Kotar Bike Tour", held annually since 2012, sometimes goes through Skrad, such as in the third leg for 2023.

== See also ==
- Zeleni Vir Hydroelectric Power Plant
