= Zakrajc Brodski =

Settlement in Croatia

Zakrajc Brodski Zakrajac Brodski
- settlement
- Interactive map of Zakrajc Brodski
- Location within Croatia
- Coordinates: 45°27′22″N 14°52′46″E
- Country: Croatia
- County: Primorje-Gorski Kotar
- Municipality: Skrad

Area
  - Total: 0.9 km^{2} (0.35 sq mi)

Population (2021)
  - Total: 1
  - Density: 1.1/km^{2} (2.9/sq mi)
- Time zone: UTC+1 (CET)
  - Summer (DST): UTC+2 (CEST)
- Postal code: 51300 Delnice

Zakrajc Brodski is a settlement in the Municipality of Skrad in Croatia. In 2021, its population was 1.

== Demographics ==
Zakrajc Brodski: Population trends 1857–2021
v

population	94	38	34	31	24	47	46	36	29	37	24	19	7	3	1	1	1
	1857	1869	1880	1890	1900	1910	1921	1931	1948	1953	1961	1971	1981	1991	2001	2011	2021

Sources: Croatian Bureau of Statistics publications
