= Maklen =

Settlement in Primorje-Gorski Kotar County, Croatia

- Settlement
- Interactive map of Maklen
- Location of Maklen in Croatia
- Coordinates: 45°28′15″N 14°57′41″E
- Country: Croatia
- County: Primorje-Gorski Kotar
- Municipality: Brod Moravice

Area
  - Total: 0.5 km^{2} (0.19 sq mi)

Population (2021)
  - Total: 1
  - Density: 2.0/km^{2} (5.2/sq mi)
- Time zone: UTC+1 (CET)
  - Summer (DST): UTC+2 (CEST)
- Postal code: 51326 Vrbovsko

Maklen is a settlement in the Municipality of Brod Moravice in Croatia. In 2021, its population was 1.

== Demographics ==
Maklen: Population trends 1857–2021
v

population					68	71	65	54	42	43	31	24	18	12	11	2	1
	1857	1869	1880	1890	1900	1910	1921	1931	1948	1953	1961	1971	1981	1991	2001	2011	2021

Sources: Croatian Bureau of Statistics publications
