= Rogi, Croatia =

Settlement in Croatia

Rogi
- settlement
- Interactive map of Rogi
- Location within Croatia
- Coordinates: 45°25′38″N 14°52′24″E
- Country: Croatia
- County: Primorje-Gorski Kotar
- Municipality: Skrad

Area
  - Total: 6.7 km^{2} (2.6 sq mi)

Population (2021)
  - Total: 7
  - Density: 1.0/km^{2} (2.7/sq mi)
- Time zone: UTC+1 (CET)
  - Summer (DST): UTC+2 (CEST)
- Postal code: 51300 Delnice

Rogi is a settlement in the Municipality of Skrad in Croatia. In 2021, its population was 7.

== Demographics ==
Rogi: Population trends 1857–2021
v

population	103	106	106	90	96	123	92	87	88	95	81	41	32	21	11	12	7
	1857	1869	1880	1890	1900	1910	1921	1931	1948	1953	1961	1971	1981	1991	2001	2011	2021

Sources: Croatian Bureau of Statistics publications
