= Hribac =

Settlement in Croatia

- settlement
- Interactive map of Hribac
- Location within Croatia
- Coordinates: 45°24′57″N 14°55′31″E
- Country: Croatia
- County: Primorje-Gorski Kotar
- Municipality: Skrad

Area
  - Total: 1.4 km^{2} (0.54 sq mi)

Population (2021)
  - Total: 17
  - Density: 12/km^{2} (31/sq mi)
- Time zone: UTC+1 (CET)
  - Summer (DST): UTC+2 (CEST)
- Postal code: 51300 Delnice

Hribac is a settlement in the Municipality of Skrad in Croatia. In 2021, its population was 17.

== Demographics ==
Hribac: Population trends 1857–2021
v

population	120	97	91	67	77	92	88	110	97	101	103	93	58	47	32	20	17
	1857	1869	1880	1890	1900	1910	1921	1931	1948	1953	1961	1971	1981	1991	2001	2011	2021

Sources: Croatian Bureau of Statistics publications

== Sports ==
The "Gorski Kotar Bike Tour", held annually since 2012, sometimes goes through Hribac, such as in the third leg for 2023.
