= Gornji Kuti =

- Village
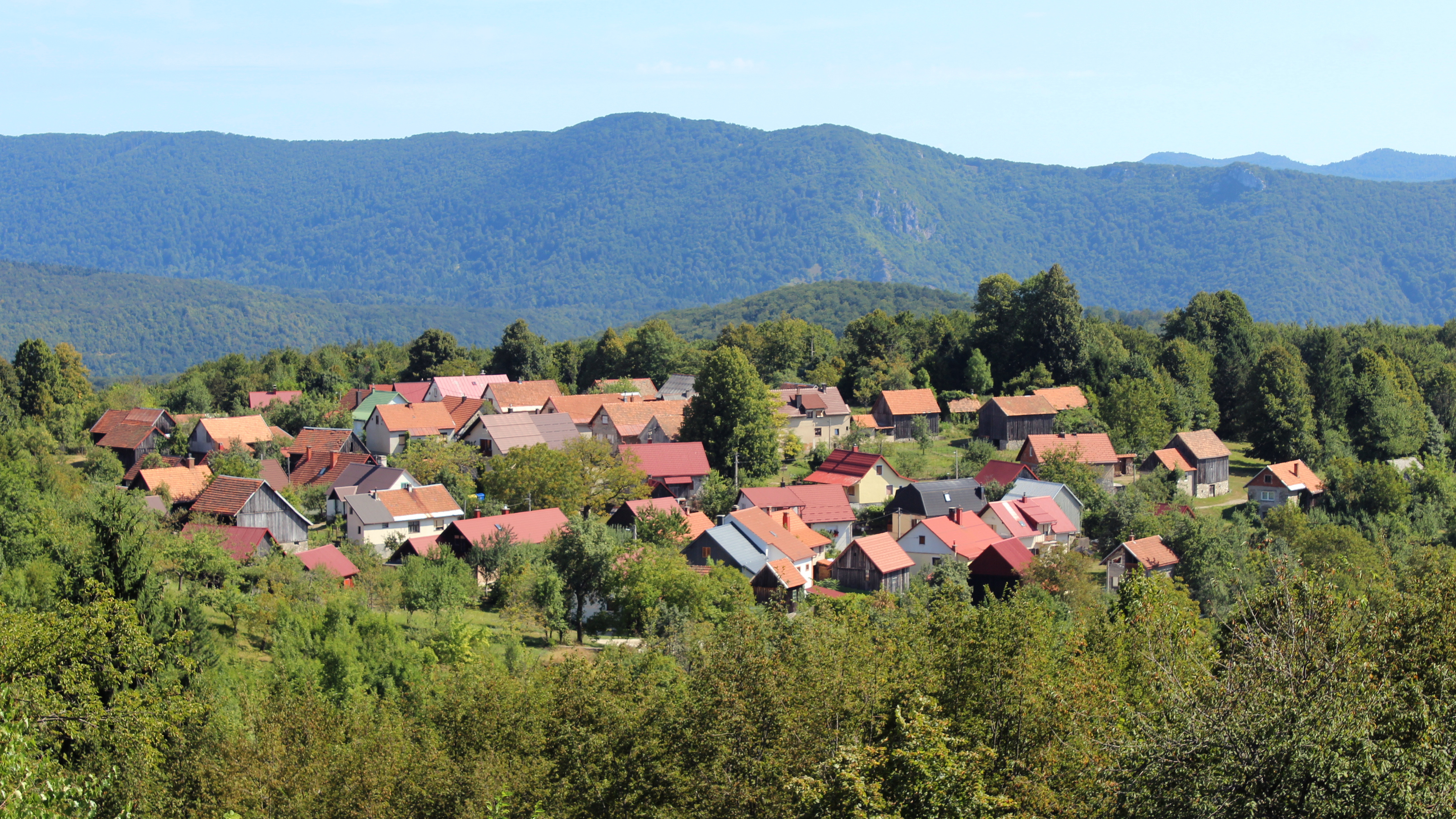

- Location within Croatia
- Coordinates: 45.471748°N 14.975467°E
- Country: Croatia
- County: Primorje-Gorski Kotar County
- City: Brod Moravice

Area
  - Total: 3.6 km^{2} (1.4 sq mi)

Population (2021)
  - Total: 28
  - Density: 7.8/km^{2} (20/sq mi)
- Time zone: UTC+1 (CET)
  - Summer (DST): UTC+2 (CEST)
- Postal code: 51326
- Area code: +385 051

Gornji Kuti is a village in Croatia, under the Brod Moravice township, in Primorje-Gorski Kotar County.
