= Bukov Vrh =

Settlement in Croatia

- settlement
- Interactive map of Bukov Vrh
- Location within Croatia
- Coordinates: 45°25′04″N 14°56′50″E
- Country: Croatia
- County: Primorje-Gorski Kotar
- Municipality: Skrad

Area
  - Total: 8.7 km^{2} (3.4 sq mi)

Population (2021)
  - Total: 27
  - Density: 3.1/km^{2} (8.0/sq mi)
- Time zone: UTC+1 (CET)
  - Summer (DST): UTC+2 (CEST)
- Postal code: 51300 Delnice

Bukov Vrh is a settlement in the Municipality of Skrad in Croatia. In 2021, its population was 27.

== History ==
A 22 December 1939 decision as part of agrarian reforms by Ban Šubašić to confiscate the local forest property of the Thurn and Taxis family, Kálmán Ghyczy and Nikola Petrović resulted in a legal dispute known as the Thurn and Taxis Affair, in part because of the relative status of the family and in part because of the proximity to the Italian border.

== Demographics ==
Bukov Vrh: Population trends 1857–2021
v

| population | 248 | 289 | 244 | 235 | 225 | 266 | 243 | 253 | 272 | 237 | 225 | 208 | 136 | 93 | 57 | 43 | 27 |
| | 1857 | 1869 | 1880 | 1890 | 1900 | 1910 | 1921 | 1931 | 1948 | 1953 | 1961 | 1971 | 1981 | 1991 | 2001 | 2011 | 2021 |

Sources: Croatian Bureau of Statistics publications

== Governance ==
On 1 July 1893, Skrad obćina was divided into Skrad with tax districts Bukov Vrh and Divjake, and Brod-Moravice with tax districts Brod-Moravice and Završje.

== Bibliography ==
- Prusac, Stjepan (2023-09-26) [defended 2023-09-25]. Posjedi obitelji Thurn Taxis nakon 1918. godine [Thurn Taxis Estates in Croatia after First World War] (Thesis) (in Croatian). Zagreb: Filozofski fakultet Sveučilišta u Zagrebu.
- Banska vlast Banovine Hrvatske (1940b). "Gospodarska prosvjeta i banovinska dobra". Godišnjak banske vlasti Banovine Hrvatske. Vol. 1. pp. 89–96.
