= Seoca =

Seoca (Cyrillic: Сеоца) may refer to:

- Seoca, Bosnia and Herzegovina, a village near Goražde
- Seoca, Bar, a village in Bar Municipality, Montenegro
- Seoca, Andrijevica, a village in Andrijevica Municipality, Montenegro
- Seoca, Podgorica, a village in Podgorica Municipality, Montenegro
- Seoca, Croatia, a village near Omiš

== See also ==
- Seoce (disambiguation) (Cyrl: Сеоце)
- Selca (disambiguation) (Cyrl: Селца)
- Selce (disambiguation) (Cyrl: Селце)
