= Zavrh, Croatia =

Settlement in Primorje-Gorski Kotar County, Croatia

Zavrh
- Settlement
- Interactive map of Zavrh
- Location of Zavrh in Croatia
- Coordinates: 45°30′46″N 14°56′33″E
- Country: Croatia
- County: Primorje-Gorski Kotar
- Municipality: Brod Moravice

Area
  - Total: 0.9 km^{2} (0.35 sq mi)

Population (2021)
  - Total: 1
  - Density: 1.1/km^{2} (2.9/sq mi)
- Time zone: UTC+1 (CET)
  - Summer (DST): UTC+2 (CEST)
- Postal code: 51326 Vrbovsko

Zavrh is a settlement in the Municipality of Brod Moravice in Croatia. In 2021, its population was 1.

== Demographics ==
Zavrh: Population trends 1857–2021
v

population	68	52	52	62	53	52	46	45	35	31	28	23	16	5	1		1
	1857	1869	1880	1890	1900	1910	1921	1931	1948	1953	1961	1971	1981	1991	2001	2011	2021

Sources: Croatian Bureau of Statistics publications
