= Hosnik =

Settlement in Croatia

- settlement
- Interactive map of Hosnik
- Location within Croatia
- Coordinates: 45°27′40″N 14°55′23″E
- Country: Croatia
- County: Primorje-Gorski Kotar
- Municipality: Skrad

Area
  - Total: 1.3 km^{2} (0.50 sq mi)

Population (2021)
  - Total: 0
  - Density: 0.0/km^{2} (0.0/sq mi)
- Time zone: UTC+1 (CET)
  - Summer (DST): UTC+2 (CEST)
- Postal code: 51300 Delnice

Hosnik is a settlement in the Municipality of Skrad in Croatia. In 2021, its population was 0.

== Demographics ==
Hosnik: Population trends 1857–2021
v

population	37	33	29	22	24	21	14	19	14	12	10	4	3		1	1
	1857	1869	1880	1890	1900	1910	1921	1931	1948	1953	1961	1971	1981	1991	2001	2011	2021

Sources: Croatian Bureau of Statistics publications
