= Lokvica, Croatia =

Lokvica
- Village
- Interactive map of Lokvica
- Coordinates: 45.466°N 14.952°E
- Country: Croatia
- County: Primorje-Gorski Kotar
- Municipality: Brod Moravice

Area
  - Total: 0.8 km^{2} (0.31 sq mi)

Population (2021)
  - Total: 21
  - Density: 26/km^{2} (68/sq mi)
- Time zone: UTC+1 (CET)
  - Summer (DST): UTC+2 (CEST)

Lokvica is a small village in Brod Moravice municipality, Croatia.

== History ==
It was recorded as Loguitza on the 1673 map of Stjepan Glavač.

== Demographics ==
Village of Lokvica: Population trends 1857–2021
v

population	62	82	75	97	101	97	77	84	73	96	99	99	71	52	42	38	21
	1857	1869	1880	1890	1900	1910	1921	1931	1948	1953	1961	1971	1981	1991	2001	2011	2021

Sources: Croatian Bureau of Statistics publications

== Sports ==
Beginning in 2013, the 7 stage 260 kilometres (160 mi) long Cycling Trail of Gorski Kotar (Croatian: Goranska biciklistička transverzala) passes through Lokvica.

== Bibliography ==
- Melem Hajdarović, Mihela (2023-06-14). "Glavačeva karta Hrvatske iz 1673. – njezini toponimi, geografski sadržaj i historijskogeografski kontekst" [Glavač’s map of Croatia from 1673: Its toponyms, geographical content, and historical-geographical context]. Studia lexicographica. 17 (32): 47–78. doi:10.33604/sl.17.32.2. eISSN 2459-5578.
