= Goliki =

- Village
- Location within Croatia
- Coordinates: 45°29′N 14°56′E
- Country: Croatia

Area
  - Total: 0.8 km^{2} (0.31 sq mi)

Population (2021)
  - Total: 0
  - Density: 0.0/km^{2} (0.0/sq mi)
- Time zone: UTC+1 (CET)
  - Summer (DST): UTC+2 (CEST)

Goliki is an uninhabited settlement in Croatia.
