= Gornja Dobra, Croatia =

Coordinates: 45°26′34″N 14°56′29″E

Gornja Dobra
- Village
- Interactive map of Gornja Dobra
- Country: Croatia
- County: Primorje-Gorski Kotar County
- Municipality: Skrad

Area
  - Total: 2.1 km^{2} (0.81 sq mi)

Population (2021)
  - Total: 38
  - Density: 18/km^{2} (47/sq mi)
- Time zone: UTC+1 (CET)
  - Summer (DST): UTC+2 (CEST)

Gornja Dobra is a village in Croatia. It is connected by the D3 highway.

== History ==
In 1860–1879, Matija Mažuranić wrote a 62 folio manuscript today titled Writings on the Building of Roads in Gorski Kotar and Lika (Croatian: Spisi o gradnji cesta u Gorskom Kotaru i Lici), today with signature HR-ZaNSK R 6424. A 21 folio manuscript dated 1872 titled Darstellung der Entstehung des Baues ... der Luisenstrasse together with a translation by I. Mikloušić is kept as HR-ZaNSK R 4572.

On 12 December 2017, a severe wind hit Gornja Dobra, blocking traffic to and from it.
