= Matići, Bosnia and Herzegovina =

Village in Bosnia and Herzegovina

Matići
- Village
- Location within Bosnia and Herzegovina
- Coordinates: 45.0014856°N 18.6317768°E
- Country: Bosnia and Herzegovina
- Entity: Federation of Bosnia and Herzegovina
- Canton: Posavina
- Municipality: Orašje

Area
  - Total: 3.68 sq mi (9.54 km^{2})

Population (2013)
  - Total: 1,602
  - Density: 435/sq mi (168/km^{2})
- Time zone: UTC+1 (CET)
  - Summer (DST): UTC+2 (CEST)

Matići is a village in the municipality of Orašje, Bosnia and Herzegovina.

== Demographics ==
According to the 2013 census, its population was 1,602.

Ethnicity in 2013
Ethnicity	Number	Percentage
Croats	1,591	99.3%
Serbs	4	0.2%
Bosniaks	1	0.1%
other/undeclared	6	0.4%
Total	1,392	100%
