= Veliko Selce =

Settlement in Croatia

- settlement
- Interactive map of Veliko Selce
- Location within Croatia
- Coordinates: 45°25′45″N 14°54′48″E
- Country: Croatia
- County: Primorje-Gorski Kotar
- Municipality: Skrad

Area
  - Total: 1.6 km^{2} (0.62 sq mi)

Population (2021)
  - Total: 70
  - Density: 44/km^{2} (110/sq mi)
- Time zone: UTC+1 (CET)
  - Summer (DST): UTC+2 (CEST)
- Postal code: 51300 Delnice

Veliko Selce is a settlement in the Municipality of Skrad in Croatia. In 2021, its population was 70.

== Demographics ==
Veliko Selce: Population trends 1857–2021
v

population	89	68	75	69	103	97	93	103	99	105	117	118	112	108	84	73	70
	1857	1869	1880	1890	1900	1910	1921	1931	1948	1953	1961	1971	1981	1991	2001	2011	2021

Sources: Croatian Bureau of Statistics publications

== Sports ==
The "Gorski Kotar Bike Tour", held annually since 2012, sometimes goes through Veliko Selce, such as in the third leg for 2023.
