= Anamarija Stibilj Šajn =

Slovenian art historian

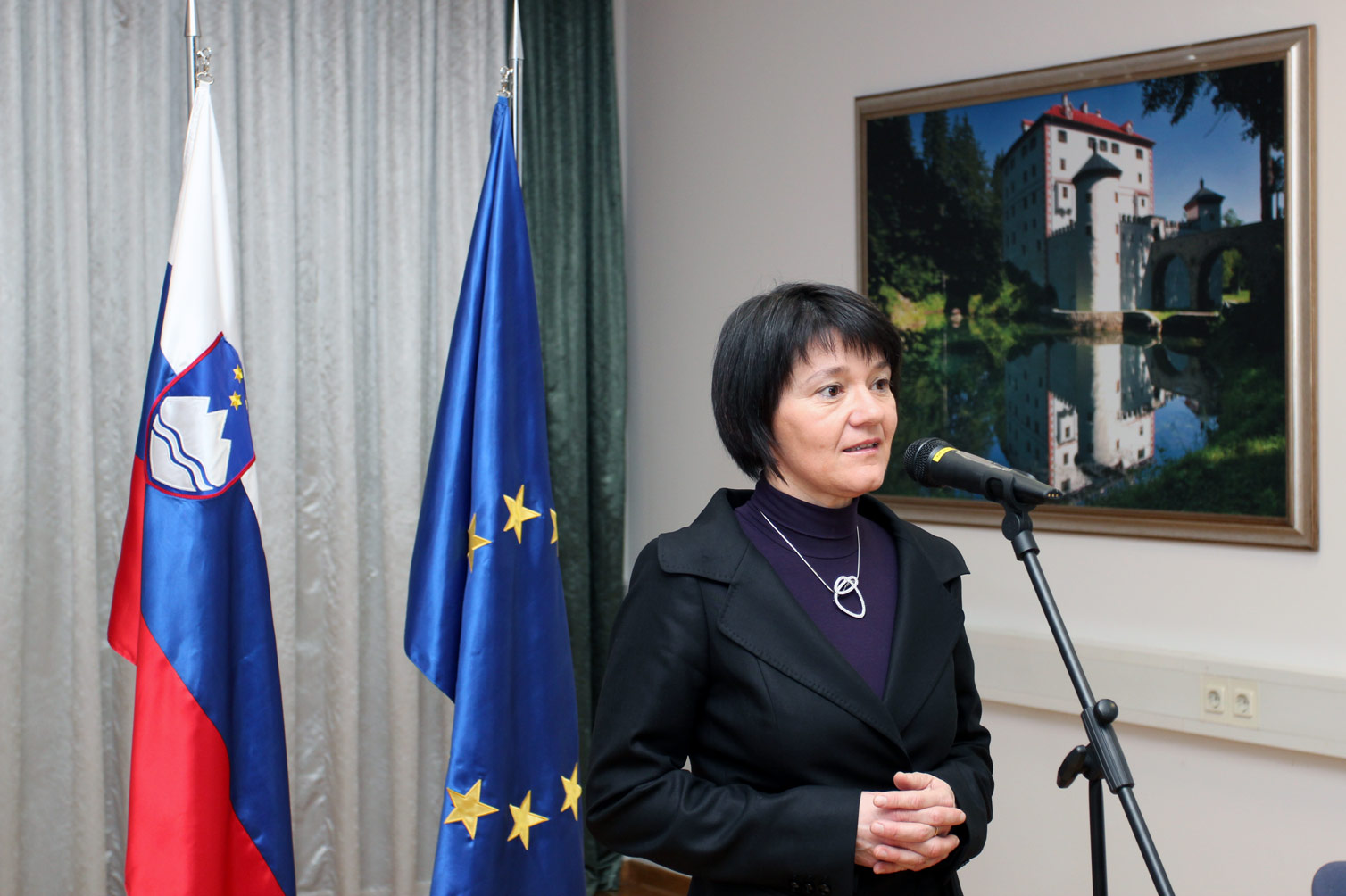
- Anamarija Stibilj Šajn, 2010
- Born: June 5, 1965; Ajdovščina, Slovenia
- Education: Faculty of Arts in Ljubljana
- Known for: art historian, curator, art critic
- Movement: Contemporary art, Modern art

Anamarija Stibilj Šajn (5 June 1965) is a Slovenian art historian, curator, and art critic.

== Biography ==
Šajn studied at the Faculty of Arts in Ljubljana, Slovenia. She first worked as a teacher, and in 1999 she became a freelance art reviewer and curator. For two and a half decades she has been managing the exhibition activities of the Kosovel Centre in Sežana as a freelancer and collaborated with various galleries in Slovenia and abroad, including the Turnac Gallery in Novi Vinodolski (Croatia), the Pavelhaus Gallery (Austria), the Ars Gallery in Gorizia (Italy), and has presented Slovenian artists on several occasions in Rome, Vienna, Brussels, and London.

== Work ==
Šajn has been involved in the formation of the Casoria International Contemporary Art Museum in Naples with a selection of Slovenian artists. Since 1993, she has been involved as an expert collaborator in the International Art Workshop "Slovenia, Open to Art" (Sinji Vrh above Ajdovščina, Slovenia). She took over the management of the project in 2007, upgrading it to the level of a symposium. In 2008, Šajn presented ten Slovenian painters in the Stedelijk Museum Amsterdam and Galerie Pand Paulus in Schiedam. In addition to reviews, she has also prepared monographs on a number of national and international authors (Nikolaj Mašukov, Adel Seyoun, Azad Karim, Eduard Belsky). In 2021, she prepared a monograph for Sonja Tavčar Skaberne, and in 2022 for Konrad Kranjc and Gregor Pratneker.
