= Gornja Lamana Draga =

- Village
- Interactive map of Gornja Lamana Draga
- Coordinates: 45.519°N 14.946°E
- Country: Croatia
- County: Primorje-Gorski Kotar
- Municipality: Brod Moravice

Area
  - Total: 0.6 km^{2} (0.23 sq mi)

Population (2021)
  - Total: 0
  - Density: 0.0/km^{2} (0.0/sq mi)
- Time zone: UTC+1 (CET)
  - Summer (DST): UTC+2 (CEST)

Gornja Lamana Draga is a small uninhabited village in Brod Moravice municipality, Croatia.

== Demographics ==
Village of Gornja Lamana Draga: Population trends 1857–2021
v

| population | | | | | | 23 | 17 | 17 | 23 | 19 | 12 | 9 | 7 |
| | 1857 | 1869 | 1880 | 1890 | 1900 | 1910 | 1921 | 1931 | 1948 | 1953 | 1961 | 1971 | 1981 | 1991 | 2001 | 2011 | 2021 |

Note:The villages Donja Lamana Draga and Gornja Lamana Draga were listed separately only from 1910. Until 1900 they were counted under "Lamana Draga". Sources: Croatian Bureau of Statistics publications
