= Podgorani, Croatia =

Settlement in Primorje-Gorski Kotar County, Croatia

Podgorani
- Settlement
- Interactive map of Podgorani
- Location of Podgorani in Croatia
- Coordinates: 45°29′56″N 14°56′28″E
- Country: Croatia
- County: Primorje-Gorski Kotar
- Municipality: Brod Moravice

Area
  - Total: 0.8 km^{2} (0.31 sq mi)

Population (2021)
  - Total: 0
  - Density: 0.0/km^{2} (0.0/sq mi)
- Time zone: UTC+1 (CET)
  - Summer (DST): UTC+2 (CEST)
- Postal code: 51326 Vrbovsko

Podgorani is a settlement in the Municipality of Brod Moravice in Croatia. In 2021, its population was 0.

== Demographics ==
Podgorani: Population trends 1857–2021
v

population	45	67	65	60	57	58	63	47	30	28	15	13	6			1
	1857	1869	1880	1890	1900	1910	1921	1931	1948	1953	1961	1971	1981	1991	2001	2011	2021

Sources: Croatian Bureau of Statistics publications
