= Buzin, Primorje-Gorski Kotar County =

Settlement in Croatia

Buzin
- settlement
- Interactive map of Buzin
- Location within Croatia
- Coordinates: 45°25′48″N 14°52′41″E
- Country: Croatia
- County: Primorje-Gorski Kotar
- Municipality: Skrad

Area
  - Total: 1.3 km^{2} (0.50 sq mi)

Population (2021)
  - Total: 1
  - Density: 0.77/km^{2} (2.0/sq mi)
- Time zone: UTC+1 (CET)
  - Summer (DST): UTC+2 (CEST)
- Postal code: 51300 Delnice

Buzin is a settlement in the Municipality of Skrad in Croatia. In 2021, its population was 1.

== Demographics ==
Buzin: Population trends 1857–2021
v

population	52	67	43	43	28	46	42	39	31	29	20	14	7	2	1	2	1
	1857	1869	1880	1890	1900	1910	1921	1931	1948	1953	1961	1971	1981	1991	2001	2011	2021

Sources: Croatian Bureau of Statistics publications
