= Malo Selce =

Settlement in Croatia

- settlement
- Interactive map of Malo Selce
- Location within Croatia
- Coordinates: 45°26′07″N 14°55′25″E
- Country: Croatia
- County: Primorje-Gorski Kotar
- Municipality: Skrad

Area
  - Total: 1.6 km^{2} (0.62 sq mi)

Population (2021)
  - Total: 11
  - Density: 6.9/km^{2} (18/sq mi)
- Time zone: UTC+1 (CET)
  - Summer (DST): UTC+2 (CEST)
- Postal code: 51300 Delnice

Malo Selce is a settlement in the Municipality of Skrad in Croatia. In 2021, its population was 11.

== Demographics ==
Malo Selce: Population trends 1857–2021
v

| population | 45 | 26 | 40 | 46 | 39 | 42 | 45 | 67 | 63 | 63 | 61 | 55 | 47 | 32 | 21 | 12 | 11 |
| | 1857 | 1869 | 1880 | 1890 | 1900 | 1910 | 1921 | 1931 | 1948 | 1953 | 1961 | 1971 | 1981 | 1991 | 2001 | 2011 | 2021 |

Sources: Croatian Bureau of Statistics publications
