= Selce, Prilep =

Selce Селце
- Village
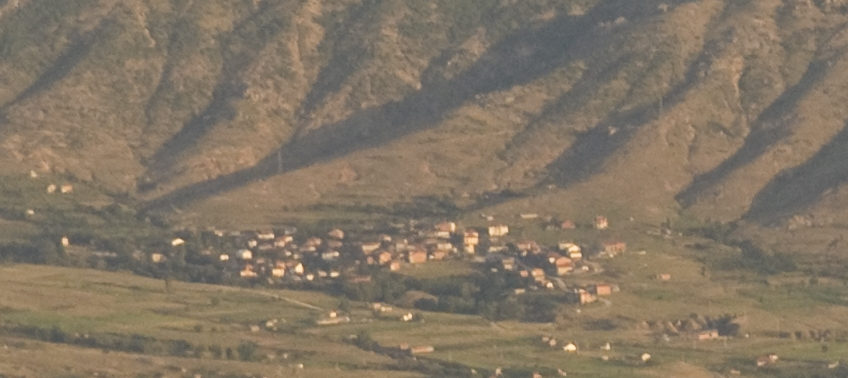

- Location within North Macedonia
- Country: North Macedonia
- Region: Pelagonia
- Municipality: Prilep
- Elevation: 750 m (2,460 ft)

Population (2002)
  - Total: 294
- Time zone: UTC+1 (CET)
- Postal code: 7500
- Area code: +38948

Selce is a village in Prilep Municipality.

== Demographics ==
According to the 2002 census, the village had a total of 294 inhabitants. Ethnic groups in the village include:

- Macedonians 294
