= Smišljak, Brod Moravice =

Smišljak
- Village
- Location within Croatia
- Coordinates: 45.457°N 14.944°E
- Country: Croatia
- County: Primorje-Gorski Kotar
- Municipality: Brod Moravice

Area
  - Total: 1.2 km^{2} (0.46 sq mi)

Population (2021)
  - Total: 0
  - Density: 0.0/km^{2} (0.0/sq mi)
- Time zone: UTC+1 (CET)
  - Summer (DST): UTC+2 (CEST)

Smišljak is a currently uninhabited abandoned settlement in Croatia.

== Demographics ==
1857	1869	1880	1890	1900	1910	1921	1931	1948	1953	1961	1971	1981	1991	2001	2011
20	20	16	21	18	9	18	22	17	20	14	4	2	0	0	0
