= Buzin (surname) =

Buzin is a surname. Notable people with the surname include:

- André Buzin (born 1946), Belgian artist
- Rich Buzin (1946–2020), American football player
