= Novi Lazi, Croatia =

Settlement in Primorje-Gorski Kotar County, Croatia

Novi Lazi
- Settlement
- Interactive map of Novi Lazi
- Location of Novi Lazi in Croatia
- Coordinates: 45°26′40″N 14°58′01″E
- Country: Croatia
- County: Primorje-Gorski Kotar
- Municipality: Brod Moravice

Area
  - Total: 1.2 km^{2} (0.46 sq mi)

Population (2021)
  - Total: 6
  - Density: 5.0/km^{2} (13/sq mi)
- Time zone: UTC+1 (CET)
  - Summer (DST): UTC+2 (CEST)
- Postal code: 51326 Vrbovsko

Novi Lazi is a settlement in the Municipality of Brod Moravice in Croatia. In 2021, its population was 6.

== Demographics ==
Novi Lazi: Population trends 1857–2021
v

population	54	46	36	33	30	30	34	44	33	38	30	22	17	15	9	8	6
	1857	1869	1880	1890	1900	1910	1921	1931	1948	1953	1961	1971	1981	1991	2001	2011	2021

Sources: Croatian Bureau of Statistics publications
