= Planica, Croatia =

Settlement in Primorje-Gorski Kotar County, Croatia

Planica
- Settlement
- Interactive map of Planica
- Location of Planica in Croatia
- Coordinates: 45°29′08″N 14°54′48″E
- Country: Croatia
- County: Primorje-Gorski Kotar
- Municipality: Brod Moravice

Area
  - Total: 1.5 km^{2} (0.58 sq mi)

Population (2021)
  - Total: 1
  - Density: 0.67/km^{2} (1.7/sq mi)
- Time zone: UTC+1 (CET)
  - Summer (DST): UTC+2 (CEST)
- Postal code: 51326 Vrbovsko

Planica is a settlement in the Municipality of Brod Moravice in Croatia. In 2021, its population was 1.

== Demographics ==
Planica: Population trends 1857–2021
v

population	27	31	25	25	27	34	17	20	23	24	25	19	11	6	1	1	1
	1857	1869	1880	1890	1900	1910	1921	1931	1948	1953	1961	1971	1981	1991	2001	2011	2021

Sources: Croatian Bureau of Statistics publications
