= Klepeće Selo =

Settlement in Primorje-Gorski Kotar County, Croatia

- Settlement
- Interactive map of Klepeće Selo
- Location of Klepeće Selo in Croatia
- Coordinates: 45°29′40″N 14°56′59″E
- Country: Croatia
- County: Primorje-Gorski Kotar
- Municipality: Brod Moravice

Area
  - Total: 0.9 km^{2} (0.35 sq mi)

Population (2021)
  - Total: 1
  - Density: 1.1/km^{2} (2.9/sq mi)
- Time zone: UTC+1 (CET)
  - Summer (DST): UTC+2 (CEST)
- Postal code: 51326 Vrbovsko

Klepeće Selo is a settlement in the Municipality of Brod Moravice in Croatia. In 2021, its population was 1.

== Demographics ==
Klepeće Selo: Population trends 1857–2021
v

population	107	64	62	44	47	60	56	60	44	50	42	32	14	12	4	4	1
	1857	1869	1880	1890	1900	1910	1921	1931	1948	1953	1961	1971	1981	1991	2001	2011	2021

Sources: Croatian Bureau of Statistics publications
