= Gornji Šajn =

- Village
- Interactive map of Gornji Šajn
- Coordinates: 45.493°N 14.955°E
- Country: Croatia
- County: Primorje-Gorski Kotar
- Municipality: Brod Moravice

Area
  - Total: 2.7 km^{2} (1.0 sq mi)

Population (2021)
  - Total: 15
  - Density: 5.6/km^{2} (14/sq mi)
- Time zone: UTC+1 (CET)
  - Summer (DST): UTC+2 (CEST)

Gornji Šajn is a small village in Brod Moravice municipality, Croatia.

== History ==
On 18 July 2023, the wind of a thunderstorm hit the 35/20 KV Kupjak substation, leaving Šajn without power.

== Demographics ==
Village of Gornji Šajn: Population trends 1857–2021
v

population	118	95	87	103	147	126	124	87	76	73	68	57	32	16	9	12	15
	1857	1869	1880	1890	1900	1910	1921	1931	1948	1953	1961	1971	1981	1991	2001	2011	2021

Note:"Šajn" until 1921. Separate counts for Gornji and Donji Šajn began in 1931. Sources: Croatian Bureau of Statistics publications
