= Donja Lamana Draga =

- Village
- Interactive map of Donja Lamana Draga
- Coordinates: 45.508°N 14.966°E
- Country: Croatia
- County: Primorje-Gorski Kotar
- Municipality: Brod Moravice

Area
  - Total: 1.2 km^{2} (0.46 sq mi)

Population (2021)
  - Total: 4
  - Density: 3.3/km^{2} (8.6/sq mi)
- Time zone: UTC+1 (CET)
  - Summer (DST): UTC+2 (CEST)

Donja Lamana Draga is a small village in Brod Moravice municipality, Croatia.

== History ==
On 18 July 2023, the wind of a thunderstorm hit the 35/20 KV Kupjak substation, leaving Lamana Draga without power.

== Demographics ==
Village of Donja Lamana Draga: Population trends 1857–2021
v

population	66	53	54	58	45	26	29	25	25	23	24	15	13	7	4	2	4
	1857	1869	1880	1890	1900	1910	1921	1931	1948	1953	1961	1971	1981	1991	2001	2011	2021

Note:The villages Donja Lamana Draga and Gornja Lamana Draga were listed separately only from 1910. Until 1900 they were counted under "Lamana Draga", so this graph includes both villages before 1910. Sources: Croatian Bureau of Statistics publications
