= Krunoslav Draganović =

Bosnian Croat Catholic priest

- Born: Krunoslav Stjepan Draganović; 30 October 1903; Matići, Austro-Hungary (present-day Bosnia and Herzegovina)
- Died: 5 July 1983 (aged 79); Sarajevo, SFR Yugoslavia
- Occupations: Roman Catholic priest and historian Headed the Confraternity of San Girolamo ratline

Krunoslav Stjepan Draganović (30 October 1903 – 5 July 1983) was a Bosnian Croat Catholic priest associated with the ratlines which aided the escape of Ustaše war criminals from Europe after World War II while he was living and working at the College of St. Jerome in Rome. He was an Ustaša and a functionary in the fascist puppet state called the Independent State of Croatia.

== Early life ==
Draganović was born in the village of Matići near Orašje, in Bosnia and Herzegovina under Austro-Hungarian rule. He attended secondary school in Travnik and studied theology and philosophy in Sarajevo. Draganović was ordained a priest on 1 July 1928.

From 1932 to 1935, he studied at the Pontifical Oriental Institute and Gregorian University in Rome. In 1937, his German language doctoral dissertation, titled Massenübertritte von Katholiken zur Orthodoxie im kroatischen Sprachgebiet zur Zeit der Türkenherrschaft (Mass conversions of Catholics to Orthodoxy in the Croatian-speaking area during the Turkish rule) was published. This later was used by the Ustaše as a justification for forced conversions to Catholicism.

In 1935, he returned to Bosnia, initially as secretary to Archbishop Ivan Šarić.

== World War II and Ratlines ==
Draganović was an Ustaše lieutenant-colonel and the vice chief of the Bureau of Colonization. He oversaw confiscation of Serb property in Bosnia and Herzegovina. He was the Jasenovac concentration camp military chaplain for some time until Aloysius Stepinac sent him in mid-1943 to Rome as the second unofficial Ustaše representative. Arriving in Rome in August 1943, Draganović became secretary of the Croatian 'Confraternity of San Girolamo', based at the monastery of San Girolamo degli Illirici in Via Tomacelli. This monastery became the centre of operations for the Croat ratline, as documented by CIA surveillance files. He is believed to have been instrumental in the escape to Argentina of the Croatian wartime dictator Ante Pavelić.

Ante Pavelić hid for two years, from 1945 to 1948, in Italy under the protection of Draganović and the Vatican, before surfacing in Buenos Aires in Argentina.

Through his ratline, with assistance from the U.S. Counterintelligence Corps (CIC), Draganović played a major role in helping notorious Nazi war criminals like Klaus Barbie flee from Europe. The two maintained a friendly relationship. Austrian sociologist Klaus Taschwer has emphasized the collaboration of Draganović and Austrian Bishop Alois Hudal as instrumental in aiding the escape of Nazis to Juan Peron's Argentina.

Draganović was accused of laundering the Ustaše's treasure of jewellery and other items stolen from war victims in Croatia. In 2002, declassified CIA documents revealed that Draganović worked as a spy for the CIA from 1959 to 1962 for the purpose of gathering intelligence on the Communist but non-aligned regime of Yugoslavia, at the time headed by Tito. His employment with the CIA was eventually terminated as he was considered to be unreliable. According to the CIA, Draganović was "not amenable to control, too knowledgeable of unit personnel and activity, demanded outrageous monetary tribute and U.S. support of Croat organizations as partial payment for cooperation."

In 1945, Draganović printed his Mali hrvatski kalendar za godinu 1945 (Small Croatian Calendar for the year 1945) in Rome for Croatian emigrants.

He maintained regular contacts with the former NDH leader Ante Pavelić, who was in hiding.

== Return to Yugoslavia ==
Some mystery surrounds Draganović's later defection to Yugoslavia. After World War II, he lived in Italy and Austria gathering evidence of communist crimes committed in Yugoslavia. He was wanted by Yugoslavia's Department of State Security (UDBA).

On 10 November 1967, the Yugoslavian state attorney declared that Draganović was in Sarajevo—as a free man, as Yugoslav authorities reportedly sought information from Draganović in exchange for granting him freedom. He was supposed to "tell-all", name his colleagues and like-minded people, hand his archive over to Tito's agents, make some positive remarks about Communist Yugoslavia and in return, Belgrade would waive judicial condemnation and imprisonment.

UDBA held Draganović in Belgrade for 42 days and once the investigation against him concluded he appeared in Sarajevo where he held a press conference (on 15 November 1967) at which he praised the "democratisation and humanising of life" under Tito. He denied claims made by the Croatian diaspora press that he had been kidnapped or entrapped by the UDBA. Draganović spent his last years in Sarajevo forming a new general register of the Roman Catholic Church in Yugoslavia. Draganović died in Sarajevo on 5 July 1983.

== Works ==
- Izvješće fra Tome Ivkovića, biskupa skradinskog, iz godine 1630. (1933)
- Izvješće apostolskog vizitatora Petra Masarechija o prilikama katoličkog naroda u Bugarskoj, Srbiji, Srijemu, Slavoniji i Bosni g. 1623. i 1624. (1937)
- Opći šematizam Katoličke crkve u Jugoslaviji, en: General schematism of the Catholic Church in Yugoslavia (1939)
- Hrvati i Herceg-Bosna (1940)
- Hrvatske biskupije. Sadašnjost kroz prizmu prošlosti (1943)
- Katalog katoličkih župa u BH u XVII. vijeku (1944)
- Povijest Crkve u Hrvatskoj (1944)
- Opći šematizam Katoličke crkve u Jugoslaviji, Cerkev v Jugoslaviji 1974, en: General schematism of the Catholic Church in Yugoslavia, The Church in Yugoslavia 1974 (1975)
- Katarina Kosača – Bosanska kraljica (1978)
- Komušina i Kondžilo (1981)
- Masovni prijelazi katolika na pravoslavlje hrvatskog govornog područja u vrijeme vladavine Turaka (1991)

== See also ==
- Operation Bloodstone
- Operation Paperclip
- Ratlines for more details and references on Draganović escape-route activities.
- Vatican City during World War II
- Catholic Church and Nazi Germany
- Catholic Church and Nazi Germany during World War II
- Pope Pius XII and the Holocaust
- Catholic clergy involvement with the Ustaše

== Bibliography ==
- Anderson, Scott & Anderson, John Lee, Inside the League: The Shocking Expose of How Terrorists, Nazis, and Latin American Death Squads Have Infiltrated the World Anti-Communist League. Dodd Mead, 1986, ISBN 0396085172
- Mark Aarons and John Loftus, Unholy Trinity: The Vatican, The Nazis, and the Swiss Bankers, St Martins Press 1991 (revised 1998)
- Uki Goñi: The Real Odessa: Smuggling the Nazis to Perón's Argentina (Granta Books, 2002, ISBN 1-86207-581-6)
- Eric Salerno, Mossad base Italia: le azioni, gli intrighi, le verità nascoste, Il Saggiatore 2010. (Italian text)
