= Donji Vučkovići =

Donji Vučkovići Доњи Вучковићи (Serbian)
- Village
- Interactive map of Donji Vučkovići
- Location within Croatia
- Coordinates: 45.4246°N 15.000365°E
- Country: Croatia
- County: Primorje-Gorski Kotar County
- City: Vrbovsko
- Community: Moravice

Area
  - Total: 0.4 km^{2} (0.15 sq mi)

Population (2021)
  - Total: 16
  - Density: 40/km^{2} (100/sq mi)
- Time zone: UTC+1 (CET)
  - Summer (DST): UTC+2 (CEST)
- Postal code: 51326
- Area code: +385 051

Donji Vučkovići is a village in Croatia, under the Vrbovsko township, in Primorje-Gorski Kotar County.

== Name ==
Donji Vučkovići is also the name of a hamlet of Polača, and a hamlet of Trnovac Glinski. Vučkovići is also the name of a hamlet of Donji Klasnić, a hamlet of Donji Skrad, a hamlet of Dugopolje, a hamlet of Ervenik, a hamlet of Gornja Bačuga, a hamlet of Gregurovec, Mihovljan, a hamlet of Jurga, a hamlet of Kistanje, a hamlet of Lapovac, a hamlet of Maljkovo, another hamlet of Polača, a hamlet of Poznanovec, a hamlet of Rajić Brdo, a hamlet of Sinj, a hamlet of Stojmerić, a hamlet of Velika Crkvina, a hamlet of Vrpolje.

== History ==
=== WWII ===
On 3 August 1941, the Ustaše arrested 85 (or 63) Serb railway workers in Srpske Moravice. These were transferred to Ogulin, then Koprivnica, then Gospić then Jadovno where they were killed. Simo Jakšić was to work that morning, but at 3:00 Mihajlo Jakšić warned him that the Ustaše had arrived at the station and by 4:00 rounded up all of the night shift work. Simo's wife had is daughter Milka tell manager Šarčević that Simo was sick, and since Šarčević demanded to hear from her mother, her mother came in person, and so Simo survived. Mihajlo Jakšić himself fled across the Dobra to Jakšići, warning second shift workers along the way while his children Stojan and Marija went to the station to call their father in sick only to encounter wailing in front of the Ferenc house and, not far from Jovičin dućan, a column of bound Serbs walking two-by-two toward the station. Marija asked Mitar Jakšić-Miljaljčev, "Mitar, what is this?" (Croatian: Mit, što je ovo?) but he merely silently lowered his shoulders in response to her asking multiple times. After the arrests at the station ended, the house to house arrests began. Nikola Matić of Donji Vučkovići attempted to flee that morning, but was captured by the Italians, who turned him over to the Ustaše. In the morning, they transferred the arrestees from the Sokolski dom to the railway station and put them on a freight train. Their wives and children called out to them, and laid themselves across the tracks. The Italians removed them from the tracks "in the roughest manner" (Croatian: na najgrublji način), and the Ustaše finished loading the wagons and the train drove off to Ogulin, eventually killed at Jadovno.

=== Recent ===
Donji Vučkovići was hit by the 2014 Dinaric ice storm.

== Demographics ==
As of 2021, there were only 2 inhabitants under the age of 20, both boys.

In 1870, Vučkovići Dolnji had 10 houses and 62 people.

In 1890, Vučkovići Dolnji had 20 houses and 112 people. They attended the school in Dokmanovići. Administered and taxed by Komorske Moravice.

Village of Donji Vučkovići: Population trends 1857–2021
v

| population | 85 | 62 | 105 | 112 | 90 | 115 | 117 | 95 | 59 | 68 | 71 | 62 | 36 | 30 | 28 | 17 | 16 |
| | 1857 | 1869 | 1880 | 1890 | 1900 | 1910 | 1921 | 1931 | 1948 | 1953 | 1961 | 1971 | 1981 | 1991 | 2001 | 2011 | 2021 |

Sources: Croatian Bureau of Statistics publications

=== Further reading ===
- Kraljevski zemaljski statistički ured (1903). Političko i sudbeno razdieljenje i Repertorij prebivališta Kraljevina Hrvatske i Slavonije po stanju od 1. travnja 1903. Zagreb: Kraljevska hrvatsko-slavonsko-dalmatinska zemaljska vlada, 🖶 Kraljevska zemaljska tiskara.
- Kraljevski zemaljski statistički ured (May 1913). "Repertorij prebivališta po županijama, upravnim kotarima, gradovima, upravnim i poreznim općinama". Političko i sudbeno razdjeljenje i Repertorij prebivališta Kraljevina Hrvatske i Slavonije po stanju od 1. siječnja 1913. Zagreb: Kraljevska hrvatsko-slavonsko-dalmatinska zemaljska vlada, 🖶 Kraljevska zemaljska tiskara. pp. 1–126. Page 32.

== Politics ==
As of its foundation on 3 March 2008, it belongs to the local committee of Moravice.

== Infrastructure ==
The water storage unit Borik in Donji Vučkovići, ultimately from Skrad, with a capacity of 300 cubic metres (11,000 ft^{3}), is responsible for Moravice, Gornji Vučkovići, Gornji Vukšići, Donji Vukšići and Carevići.
