= Petrovići, Croatia =

Petrovići Петровићи (Serbian)
- Village
- Interactive map of Petrovići
- Location within Croatia
- Coordinates: 45.422763°N 14.993155°E
- Country: Croatia
- County: Primorje-Gorski Kotar County
- City: Vrbovsko
- Community: Moravice

Area
  - Total: 1.4 km^{2} (0.54 sq mi)

Population (2021)
  - Total: 14
  - Density: 10/km^{2} (26/sq mi)
- Time zone: UTC+1 (CET)
  - Summer (DST): UTC+2 (CEST)
- Postal code: 51326
- Area code: +385 051

Petrovići or Petrovići Moravički is a village in Croatia, under the Vrbovsko township, in Primorje-Gorski Kotar County.

== History ==
On 3 August 1941, the Ustaše arrested 85 (or 63) Serb railway workers in Srpske Moravice. These were transferred to Ogulin, then Koprivnica, then Gospić then Jadovno where they were killed. On the night of the 2nd, Dušan Rajnović of Tomići had been on duty together with Lazo Jakšić. After midnight, a man approached them and warned them that the Ustaše had arrived at the station and were arresting night shift workers. A freight train had arrived around 23:00 carrying 8 Ustaše, awaited by a group of Ustaše from Moravice with lists of those who would be arrested. The two hid atop the tin-covered locomotive of series 32. Cvitešić arrived with an armed Ustaša, approached by Ivan Brajdić who asked, "Where are the locomotive watchers?" Brajdić answered he didn't know. Lazo, afraid, surrendered himself, and they bound him immediately. Nikola and Jovo Kovačević, Simo Vučković-Mljekarov of Petrovići, Nikola Nikšić Nestorov of Bunjevci and several others were already tied up in front of the office of nadzornik Polić. After that, Dušan Rajnović fled home and at dawn left for Radigojna. Dušan Hajdin was another surviving witness, who saw the Ustaše arrive and when the arrests began he notified the station manager Šarčević and the Italian rail command, but neither undertook anything, just watching it happen.

Petrovići was hit by the 2014 Dinaric ice storm.

== Demographics ==
As of 2021, the only inhabitant under the age of 20 was a single boy.

In 1870, Petrovići had 16 houses and 94 people.

In 1890, Petrovići had 16 houses and 95 people. They attended the school in Dokmanovići. Administered and taxed by Komorske Moravice.

Village of Petrovići: Population trends 1857–2021
v

population	92	94	86	95	96	110	107	104	45	41	34	23	22	22	18	15	13
	1857	1869	1880	1890	1900	1910	1921	1931	1948	1953	1961	1971	1981	1991	2001	2011	2021

Note:Petrovići Moravički from 1910 to 1970. Sources: Croatian Bureau of Statistics publications

=== Further reading ===
- Kraljevski zemaljski statistički ured (1903). Političko i sudbeno razdieljenje i Repertorij prebivališta Kraljevina Hrvatske i Slavonije po stanju od 1. travnja 1903. Zagreb: Kraljevska hrvatsko-slavonsko-dalmatinska zemaljska vlada, 🖶 Kraljevska zemaljska tiskara.
- Kraljevski zemaljski statistički ured (May 1913). "Repertorij prebivališta po županijama, upravnim kotarima, gradovima, upravnim i poreznim općinama". Političko i sudbeno razdjeljenje i Repertorij prebivališta Kraljevina Hrvatske i Slavonije po stanju od 1. siječnja 1913. Zagreb: Kraljevska hrvatsko-slavonsko-dalmatinska zemaljska vlada, 🖶 Kraljevska zemaljska tiskara. pp. 1–126. Page 32.

== Politics ==
As of its foundation on 3 March 2008, it belongs to the local committee of Moravice.

== Bibliography ==
- Korenčić, Mirko (1979). Naselja i stanovništvo Socijalističke Republike Hrvatske (1857–1971) [Villages and Population of the Socialist Republic of Croatia (1857–1971)]. Djela Jugoslavenske akademije znanosti i umjetnosti (in Serbo-Croatian). Vol. 54.
