= Bunjevci (village) =

Bunjevci Буњевци (Serbian)
- Village
- Interactive map of Bunjevci
- Location within Croatia
- Coordinates: 45.4349°N 15.013583°E
- Country: Croatia
- County: Primorje-Gorski Kotar County
- City: Vrbovsko
- Community: Moravice

Area
  - Total: 2.7 km^{2} (1.0 sq mi)

Population (2021)
  - Total: 28
  - Density: 10/km^{2} (27/sq mi)
- Time zone: UTC+1 (CET)
  - Summer (DST): UTC+2 (CEST)
- Postal code: 51326
- Area code: +385 051

Bunjevci is a village in Croatia, under the Vrbovsko township, in Primorje-Gorski Kotar County. The Lujzijana road passes through it.

== Name ==
Named after the people of the same name, Bunjevci is also the name of a hamlet of Rešetari in Slavonia, and several hamlets near Plaški: a a hamlet of Pothum Plaščanski, an alternate name of a hamlet of Međeđak.

== History ==
In 1860–1879, Matija Mažuranić wrote a 62 folio manuscript today titled Writings on the Building of Roads in Gorski Kotar and Lika (Croatian: Spisi o gradnji cesta u Gorskom Kotaru i Lici), today with signature HR-ZaNSK R 6424. A 21 folio manuscript dated 1872 titled Darstellung der Entstehung des Baues ... der Luisenstrasse togethr with a translation by I. Mikloušić is kept as HR-ZaNSK R 4572.

In 1864, a rinderpest outbreak in Bosanci and Kasuni caused the Lujzijana to be closed to horned traffic for 21 days in December.

=== WWII ===
On 3 August 1941, the Ustaše arrested 85 (or 63) Serb railway workers in Srpske Moravice. These were transferred to Ogulin, then Koprivnica, then Gospić then Jadovno where they were killed. On the night of the 2nd, Dušan Rajnović of Tomići had been on duty together with Lazo Jakšić. After midnight, a man approached them and warned them that the Ustaše had arrived at the station and were arresting night shift workers. A freight train had arrived around 23:00 carrying 8 Ustaše, awaited by a group of Ustaše from Moravice with lists of those who would be arrested. The two hid atop the tin-covered locomotive of series 32. Cvitešić arrived with an armed Ustaša, approached by Ivan Brajdić who asked, "Where are the locomotive watchers?" Brajdić answered he didn't know. Lazo, afraid, surrendered himself, and they bound him immediately. Nikola and Jovo Kovačević, Simo Vučković-Mljekarov of Petrovići, Nikola Nikšić Nestorov of Bunjevci and several others were already tied up in front of the office of nadzornik Polić. After that, Dušan Rajnović fled home and at dawn left for Radigojna. Dušan Hajdin was another surviving witness, who saw the Ustaše arrive and when the arrests began he notified the station manager Šarčević and the Italian rail command, but neither undertook anything, just watching it happen.

=== Recent ===
Bunjevci was hit by the 2014 Dinaric ice storm.

On 12 December 2017, a severe wind hit Bunjevci, blocking traffic to and from it.

== Politics ==
As of its foundation on 3 March 2008, it belongs to the local committee of Moravice.

== Demographics ==
As of 2021, there were only 2 inhabitants under the age of 20, both girls.

In 1890, Bunjevci had 12 houses and 58 people. Its hamlet Plandište had 4 houses and 31 people. They attended the school in Dokmanovići. Administered and taxed by Komorske Moravice.

Village of Bunjevci: Population trends 1857–2021
v

population			128	143	151	174	162	190	108	106	90	77	73	53	52	35	28
	1857	1869	1880	1890	1900	1910	1921	1931	1948	1953	1961	1971	1981	1991	2001	2011	2021

Note:Od 1910. do 1970. iskazivano pod imenom Bunjevci Moravički. U 1857. i 1869. podaci su sadržani u naselju Srpske Moravice. Sadrži podatke za bivše naselje Mišljenovići Moravički od 1880. do 1948. Sources: Croatian Bureau of Statistics publications

=== Further reading ===
- Korenčić, Mirko (1979). Naselja i stanovništvo Socijalističke Republike Hrvatske (1857–1971) [Villages and Population of the Socialist Republic of Croatia (1857–1971)]. Djela Jugoslavenske akademije znanosti i umjetnosti (in Serbo-Croatian). Vol. 54.
- Kraljevski zemaljski statistički ured (1903). Političko i sudbeno razdieljenje i Repertorij prebivališta Kraljevina Hrvatske i Slavonije po stanju od 1. travnja 1903. Zagreb: Kraljevska hrvatsko-slavonsko-dalmatinska zemaljska vlada, 🖶 Kraljevska zemaljska tiskara.
- Kraljevski zemaljski statistički ured (May 1913). "Repertorij prebivališta po županijama, upravnim kotarima, gradovima, upravnim i poreznim općinama". Političko i sudbeno razdjeljenje i Repertorij prebivališta Kraljevina Hrvatske i Slavonije po stanju od 1. siječnja 1913. Zagreb: Kraljevska hrvatsko-slavonsko-dalmatinska zemaljska vlada, 🖶 Kraljevska zemaljska tiskara. pp. 1–126. Page 32.
