= Jakšići, Primorje-Gorski Kotar County =

Jakšići Јакшићи (Serbian)
- Village
- Interactive map of Jakšići
- Location within Croatia
- Coordinates: 45.426046°N 15.030491°E
- Country: Croatia
- County: Primorje-Gorski Kotar County
- City: Vrbovsko
- Community: Moravice

Area
  - Total: 2.6 km^{2} (1.0 sq mi)

Population (2021)
  - Total: 42
  - Density: 16/km^{2} (42/sq mi)
- Time zone: UTC+1 (CET)
  - Summer (DST): UTC+2 (CEST)
- Postal code: 51326
- Area code: +385 051

Jakšići is a village in Croatia, under the Vrbovsko township, in Primorje-Gorski Kotar County. The Lujzijana road passes by it.

== Name ==
Among others, the Jakšići were a Serbian noble family in the 15th and 16th centuries.

Jakšići is also the name of a village and municipality in Slavonia, a hamlet of Blatuša, a hamlet of Cerova, a hamlet of Donji Velemerić, a hamlet of Glogovo, a hamlet of Gornja Trstenica, a hamlet of Panjak, a hamlet of Pecka, a hamlet of Slani Potok, a hamlet of Slunjski Moravci, upper and lower hamlets of Jezero, and upper and lower hamlets of Sokolac. Aside from streets in the above settlements, it is also the name of a street in Karlovac.

== History ==
In 1860–1879, Matija Mažuranić wrote a 62 folio manuscript today titled Writings on the Building of Roads in Gorski Kotar and Lika (Croatian: Spisi o gradnji cesta u Gorskom Kotaru i Lici), today with signature HR-ZaNSK R 6424.

In 1864, a rinderpest outbreak in Bosanci and Kasuni caused the Lujzijana to be closed to horned traffic for 21 days in December.

=== WWII ===
On 12 July, the Ministry of Deportation (Croatian: Ured za iseljavanje) was founded in Moravice, led by teacher Ivan Porić and manager Franjo Naglić, who was also an Ustaša tabornik. The board included carpenter Josip Štiglić, economist Mato Falak and općinski načelnik Anton Mufić. That July, Naglić informed his superiors that 3 Serb homesteads had been emptied in Jakšići and Gornji Vučkovići.

On 3 August 1941, the Ustaše arrested 85 (or 63) Serb railway workers in Srpske Moravice. These were transferred to Ogulin, then Koprivnica, then Gospić then Jadovno where they were killed. Simo Jakšić was to work that morning, but at 3:00 Mihajlo Jakšić warned him that the Ustaše had arrived at the station and by 4:00 rounded up all of the night shift work. Simo's wife had is daughter Milka tell manager Šarčević that Simo was sick, and since Šarčević demanded to hear from her mother, her mother came in person, and so Simo survived. Mihajlo Jakšić himself fled across the Dobra to Jakšići, warning second shift workers along the way while his children Stojan and Marija went to the station to call their father in sick only to encounter wailing in front of the Ferenc house and, not far from Jovičin dućan, a column of bound Serbs walking two-by-two toward the station. Marija asked Mitar Jakšić-Miljaljčev, "Mitar, what is this?" (Croatian: Mit, što je ovo?) but he merely silently lowered his shoulders in response to her asking multiple times. Đoko Dokmanović-Stevkov fled his house undressed. In the morning, they transferred the arrestees from the Sokolski dom to the railway station and put them on a freight train. Their wives and children called out to them, and laid themselves across the tracks. The Italians removed them from the tracks "in the roughest manner" (Croatian: na najgrublji način), and the Ustaše finished loading the wagons and the train drove off to Ogulin.

A day or two after the railway station arrests, the Ustaše were supposed to round up the remaining Serb workers at their houses. They walked the streets crying "Najbolje – rasap!" meaning "Flee and save yourselves". They were assisted by locals in the location of the Serbs' addresses.

At 21:30 on 12 June 1942, a group of 10–15 Partisans armed with rifles and machine guns attacked the Chetniks armed by the Italians in Jakšići, who successfully warded off the attack.

=== Recent ===
Jakšići was hit by the 2014 Dinaric ice storm.

On 12 December 2017, a severe wind hit Jakšići, blocking traffic to and from it.

On 25 March 2022 at 10:34 the ŽVOC Rijeka received a call about a wildfire in the Borik area, downhill from Jakšići. 250 hectares (620 acres) burned by the time it was put out at 18:42 by 78 firefighters and 20 vehicles from JVP Delnice DVD Vrbovsko, DVD Delnice, DVD Ravna Gora, DVD Lukovdol, DVD Moravice, DVD Brod Moravice, DVD Skrad, DVD Severin na Kupi, DVD Blaževci-Plemenitaš, DVD Jadrč, DVD Gomirje and DVD Jablan.

== Demographics ==
As of 2021, there were only 4 inhabitants under the age of 20.

In 1890, Jakšići had 37 houses and 223 people. They attended the school in Dokmanovići. Administered and taxed by Komorske Moravice.

Village of Jakšići: Population trends 1857–2021
v

population			216	223	201	166	175	216	145	108	103	102	102	76	72	50	42
	1857	1869	1880	1890	1900	1910	1921	1931	1948	1953	1961	1971	1981	1991	2001	2011	2021

Note:Under Moravice in 1857 and 1869. Sources: Croatian Bureau of Statistics publications

=== Further reading ===
- Kraljevski zemaljski statistički ured (1903). Političko i sudbeno razdieljenje i Repertorij prebivališta Kraljevina Hrvatske i Slavonije po stanju od 1. travnja 1903. Zagreb: Kraljevska hrvatsko-slavonsko-dalmatinska zemaljska vlada, 🖶 Kraljevska zemaljska tiskara.
- Kraljevski zemaljski statistički ured (May 1913). "Repertorij prebivališta po županijama, upravnim kotarima, gradovima, upravnim i poreznim općinama". Političko i sudbeno razdjeljenje i Repertorij prebivališta Kraljevina Hrvatske i Slavonije po stanju od 1. siječnja 1913. Zagreb: Kraljevska hrvatsko-slavonsko-dalmatinska zemaljska vlada, 🖶 Kraljevska zemaljska tiskara. pp. 1–126. Page 32.

== Politics ==
As of its foundation on 3 March 2008, it belongs to the local committee of Moravice.

== Bibliography ==
- Korenčić, Mirko (1979). Naselja i stanovništvo Socijalističke Republike Hrvatske (1857–1971) [Villages and Population of the Socialist Republic of Croatia (1857–1971)]. Djela Jugoslavenske akademije znanosti i umjetnosti (in Serbo-Croatian). Vol. 54.
- Trgo, Fabijan, ed. (1964). Zbornik dokumenata i podataka o Narodno-oslobodilačkom ratu Jugoslovenskih naroda. Vol. V, 32.
