= Dragovići, Croatia =

Dragovići Драговићи (Serbian)
- Village
- Interactive map of Dragovići
- Location within Croatia
- Coordinates: 45.428696°N 15.026329°E
- Country: Croatia
- County: Primorje-Gorski Kotar County
- City: Vrbovsko
- Community: Moravice

Area
  - Total: 0.2 km^{2} (0.077 sq mi)

Population (2021)
  - Total: 6
  - Density: 30/km^{2} (78/sq mi)
- Time zone: UTC+1 (CET)
  - Summer (DST): UTC+2 (CEST)
- Postal code: 51326
- Area code: +385 051

Dragovići is a village in Croatia, under the Vrbovsko township, in Primorje-Gorski Kotar County.

== Name ==
Dragovići is also the name of a hamlet in Donja Vrućica, a hamlet in Podosoje, a hamlet in Sonković, a hamlet in Željezno Žumberačko. Apart from streets in the aforementioned villages and hamlets, it is also the name of a street in Gračac.

== History ==
In 1860–1879, Matija Mažuranić wrote a 62 folio manuscript today titled Writings on the Building of Roads in Gorski Kotar and Lika (Croatian: Spisi o gradnji cesta u Gorskom Kotaru i Lici), today with signature HR-ZaNSK R 6424.

In September 2012, an Italian national became lost while mushroom hunting between Gorenci and Zaumol.

Dragovići was hit by the 2014 Dinaric ice storm.

== Demographics ==
As of 2021, there were no inhabitants under the age of 40.

In 1890, Dragovići had 12 houses and 63 people. They attended the school in Dokmanovići. Administered and taxed by Komorske Moravice.

Village of Dragovići: Population trends 1857–2021
v

population			77	63	79	72	75	70	48	10	14	17	10	8	4	6	6
	1857	1869	1880	1890	1900	1910	1921	1931	1948	1953	1961	1971	1981	1991	2001	2011	2021

Note:Under Moravice in 1857 and 1869. Includes Mlinari and Poljana in 1880. Sources: Croatian Bureau of Statistics publications

=== Further reading ===
- Kraljevski zemaljski statistički ured (1903). Političko i sudbeno razdieljenje i Repertorij prebivališta Kraljevina Hrvatske i Slavonije po stanju od 1. travnja 1903. Zagreb: Kraljevska hrvatsko-slavonsko-dalmatinska zemaljska vlada, 🖶 Kraljevska zemaljska tiskara.
- Kraljevski zemaljski statistički ured (May 1913). "Repertorij prebivališta po županijama, upravnim kotarima, gradovima, upravnim i poreznim općinama". Političko i sudbeno razdjeljenje i Repertorij prebivališta Kraljevina Hrvatske i Slavonije po stanju od 1. siječnja 1913. Zagreb: Kraljevska hrvatsko-slavonsko-dalmatinska zemaljska vlada, 🖶 Kraljevska zemaljska tiskara. pp. 1–126. Page 32.

== Politics ==
As of its foundation on 3 March 2008, it belongs to the local committee of Moravice.
