= Gornji Vukšići =

Gornji Vukšići Горњи Вукшићи (Serbian)
- Village
- Interactive map of Gornji Vukšići
- Location within Croatia
- Coordinates: 45.414117°N 15.005043°E
- Country: Croatia
- County: Primorje-Gorski Kotar County
- City: Vrbovsko
- Community: Moravice

Area
  - Total: 0.3 km^{2} (0.12 sq mi)

Population (2021)
  - Total: 0
  - Density: 0.0/km^{2} (0.0/sq mi)
- Time zone: UTC+1 (CET)
  - Summer (DST): UTC+2 (CEST)
- Postal code: 51326
- Area code: +385 051

Gornji Vukšići is a village in Croatia, under the Vrbovsko township, in Primorje-Gorski Kotar County.

== Name ==
Vukšići is also the name of a hamlet in Danilo, a hamlet in Danilo Kraljice, a hamlet in Kokorići, a hamlet in Ljeskovac, a hamlet in Slavsko Polje. In addition to streets in the aforementioned villages and hamlets, it is also the name of a street in Kričke.

== History ==
On 12 July, the Ministry of Deportation (Croatian: Ured za iseljavanje) was founded in Moravice, led by teacher Ivan Porić and manager Franjo Naglić, who was also an Ustaša tabornik. The board included carpenter Josip Štiglić, economist Mato Falak and općinski načelnik Anton Mufić. That July, Naglić informed his superiors that 3 Serb homesteads had been emptied in Jakšići and Gornji Vučkovići.

In 2005, a Eurasian brown bear attacked a beehive belonging to Dragoljub Krušković in Gornji Vukšići.

== Demographics ==
In 1870, Vukšići had 3 houses and 31 people.

In 1890, Vukšići had 6 houses and 54 people. They attended the school in Dokmanovići. Administered and taxed by Komorske Moravice.

As of 2011, there were four uninhabited statistical villages in Vrbovsko: Lesci, Međedi, Podvučnik and Radočaj. These were followed by Gornji Vukšići by 2021.

Village of Gornji Vukšići: Population trends 1857–2021
v

population									12	8	9	9	7	6	2
	1857	1869	1880	1890	1900	1910	1921	1931	1948	1953	1961	1971	1981	1991	2001	2011	2021

Note:Iskazuje se od 1948. kao dio naselja, a od 1953. kao naselje. Sources: Croatian Bureau of Statistics publications

=== Further reading ===
- Kraljevski zemaljski statistički ured (1903). Političko i sudbeno razdieljenje i Repertorij prebivališta Kraljevina Hrvatske i Slavonije po stanju od 1. travnja 1903. Zagreb: Kraljevska hrvatsko-slavonsko-dalmatinska zemaljska vlada, 🖶 Kraljevska zemaljska tiskara.
- Kraljevski zemaljski statistički ured (May 1913). "Repertorij prebivališta po županijama, upravnim kotarima, gradovima, upravnim i poreznim općinama". Političko i sudbeno razdjeljenje i Repertorij prebivališta Kraljevina Hrvatske i Slavonije po stanju od 1. siječnja 1913. Zagreb: Kraljevska hrvatsko-slavonsko-dalmatinska zemaljska vlada, 🖶 Kraljevska zemaljska tiskara. pp. 1–126. Page 32.

== Politics ==
As of its foundation on 3 March 2008, it belongs to the local committee of Moravice.

== Infrastructure ==
The water storage unit Borik in Donji Vučkovići, with water ultimately from Skrad, with a capacity of 300 cubic metres (11,000 ft^{3}), is responsible for Moravice, Gornji Vučkovići, Gornji Vukšići, Donji Vukšići and Carevići.
