= Mlinari =

Mlinari Млинари (Serbian)
- Village
- Interactive map of Mlinari
- Location within Croatia
- Coordinates: 45.410532°N 15.033882°E
- Country: Croatia
- County: Primorje-Gorski Kotar County
- City: Vrbovsko
- Community: Moravice

Area
  - Total: 1.7 km^{2} (0.66 sq mi)

Population (2021)
  - Total: 7
  - Density: 4.1/km^{2} (11/sq mi)
- Time zone: UTC+1 (CET)
  - Summer (DST): UTC+2 (CEST)
- Postal code: 51326
- Area code: +385 051

Mlinari is a village in Croatia, under the Vrbovsko township, in Primorje-Gorski Kotar County.

== History ==
In August 2008, a Eurasian brown bear attacked a beehive belonging to Branko Vidmar in Mlinari.

Mlinari was hit by the 2014 Dinaric ice storm.

== Demographics ==
As of 2021, the only inhabitant under the age of 20 was a single girl.

In 1890, Mlinari had 6 houses and 38 people, and was considered part of Vučinić Selo. They attended the school in Dokmanovići. Administered and taxed by Komorske Moravice.

Village of Mlinari: Population trends 1857–2021
v

| population | | | | 38 | 29 | 25 | 20 | 30 | 43 | 47 | 42 | 32 | 14 | 10 | 9 | 7 | 7 |
| | 1857 | 1869 | 1880 | 1890 | 1900 | 1910 | 1921 | 1931 | 1948 | 1953 | 1961 | 1971 | 1981 | 1991 | 2001 | 2011 | 2021 |

Note:Under Vučinići in 1857 and 1869. Under Dragovići in 1880. Sources: Croatian Bureau of Statistics publications

=== Further reading ===
- Kraljevski zemaljski statistički ured (1903). Političko i sudbeno razdieljenje i Repertorij prebivališta Kraljevina Hrvatske i Slavonije po stanju od 1. travnja 1903. Zagreb: Kraljevska hrvatsko-slavonsko-dalmatinska zemaljska vlada, 🖶 Kraljevska zemaljska tiskara.
- Kraljevski zemaljski statistički ured (May 1913). "Repertorij prebivališta po županijama, upravnim kotarima, gradovima, upravnim i poreznim općinama". Političko i sudbeno razdjeljenje i Repertorij prebivališta Kraljevina Hrvatske i Slavonije po stanju od 1. siječnja 1913. Zagreb: Kraljevska hrvatsko-slavonsko-dalmatinska zemaljska vlada, 🖶 Kraljevska zemaljska tiskara. pp. 1–126. Page 32.

== Politics ==
As of its foundation on 3 March 2008, it belongs to the local committee of Moravice.

== Bibliography ==
- Korenčić, Mirko (1979). Naselja i stanovništvo Socijalističke Republike Hrvatske (1857–1971) [Villages and Population of the Socialist Republic of Croatia (1857–1971)]. Djela Jugoslavenske akademije znanosti i umjetnosti (in Serbo-Croatian). Vol. 54.
