= Donji Vukšići =

Donji Vukšići Доњи Вукшићи (Serbian)
- Village
- Interactive map of Donji Vukšići
- Location within Croatia
- Coordinates: 45.413816°N 14.999936°E
- Country: Croatia
- County: Primorje-Gorski Kotar County
- City: Vrbovsko
- Community: Moravice

Area
  - Total: 0.5 km^{2} (0.19 sq mi)

Population (2021)
  - Total: 7
  - Density: 14/km^{2} (36/sq mi)
- Time zone: UTC+1 (CET)
  - Summer (DST): UTC+2 (CEST)
- Postal code: 51326
- Area code: +385 051

Donji Vukšići is a village in Croatia, under the Vrbovsko township, in Primorje-Gorski Kotar County.

== Name ==
Vukšići is also the name of a hamlet in Danilo, a hamlet in Danilo Kraljice, a hamlet in Kokorići, a hamlet in Ljeskovac, a hamlet in Slavsko Polje. In addition to streets in the aforementioned villages and hamlets, it is also the name of a street in Kričke.

== History ==
Donji Vukšići was hit by the 2014 Dinaric ice storm.

== Demographics ==
As of 2021, there were no inhabitants under the age of 25.

In 1870, Vukšići had 3 houses and 31 people.

In 1890, Vukšići had 6 houses and 54 people. They attended the school in Dokmanovići. Administered and taxed by Komorske Moravice.

Village of Donji Vukšići: Population trends 1857–2021
v

population	23	31	28	54	52	55	53	53	11	10	17	11	9	13	12	13	7
	1857	1869	1880	1890	1900	1910	1921	1931	1948	1953	1961	1971	1981	1991	2001	2011	2021

Note:Do 1931. iskazivano pod imenom Vukšići. Od 1900. do 1948. označavano kao dio naselja. Sources: Croatian Bureau of Statistics publications

=== Further reading ===
- Kraljevski zemaljski statistički ured (1903). Političko i sudbeno razdieljenje i Repertorij prebivališta Kraljevina Hrvatske i Slavonije po stanju od 1. travnja 1903. Zagreb: Kraljevska hrvatsko-slavonsko-dalmatinska zemaljska vlada, 🖶 Kraljevska zemaljska tiskara.
- Kraljevski zemaljski statistički ured (May 1913). "Repertorij prebivališta po županijama, upravnim kotarima, gradovima, upravnim i poreznim općinama". Političko i sudbeno razdjeljenje i Repertorij prebivališta Kraljevina Hrvatske i Slavonije po stanju od 1. siječnja 1913. Zagreb: Kraljevska hrvatsko-slavonsko-dalmatinska zemaljska vlada, 🖶 Kraljevska zemaljska tiskara. pp. 1–126. Page 32.

== Politics ==
As of its foundation on 3 March 2008, it belongs to the local committee of Moravice.

== Infrastructure ==
The water storage unit Borik in Donji Vučkovići, with water ultimately from Skrad, with a capacity of 300 cubic metres (11,000 ft^{3}), is also responsible for Moravice, Gornji Vučkovići, Gornji Vukšići, Donji Vukšići and Carevići.
