= Žakule =

Žakule Жакуле (Serbian) Žakulje
- Village
- Interactive map of Žakule
- Location within Croatia
- Coordinates: 45.41713°N 15.022767°E
- Country: Croatia
- County: Primorje-Gorski Kotar County
- City: Vrbovsko
- Community: Moravice

Area
  - Total: 0.2 km^{2} (0.077 sq mi)

Population (2021)
  - Total: 8
  - Density: 40/km^{2} (100/sq mi)
- Time zone: UTC+1 (CET)
  - Summer (DST): UTC+2 (CEST)
- Postal code: 51326
- Area code: +385 051

Žakule is a village in Croatia, under the Vrbovsko township, in Primorje-Gorski Kotar County.

== History ==
Žakule was hit by the 2014 Dinaric ice storm.

== Demographics ==
In 1870, Žakulje had 5 houses and 32 people.

In 1890, Žakule had 6 houses and 48 people. They attended the school in Dokmanovići. Administered and taxed by Komorske Moravice.

Village of Žakule: Population trends 1857–2021
v

population	32	32	55	48	70	73	69	71	64	62	65	76	103	83	28	24	8
	1857	1869	1880	1890	1900	1910	1921	1931	1948	1953	1961	1971	1981	1991	2001	2011	2021

Note:Od 1910. do 1961. iskazivano pod imenom Žakule Moravičke. U 2001. smanjeno za dio područja koji je pripojen naselju Moravice, za koji sadrži dio podataka za razdoblje od 1857. do 1991. Sources: Croatian Bureau of Statistics publications

=== Further reading ===
- Kraljevski zemaljski statistički ured (1903). Političko i sudbeno razdieljenje i Repertorij prebivališta Kraljevina Hrvatske i Slavonije po stanju od 1. travnja 1903. Zagreb: Kraljevska hrvatsko-slavonsko-dalmatinska zemaljska vlada, 🖶 Kraljevska zemaljska tiskara.
- Kraljevski zemaljski statistički ured (May 1913). "Repertorij prebivališta po županijama, upravnim kotarima, gradovima, upravnim i poreznim općinama". Političko i sudbeno razdjeljenje i Repertorij prebivališta Kraljevina Hrvatske i Slavonije po stanju od 1. siječnja 1913. Zagreb: Kraljevska hrvatsko-slavonsko-dalmatinska zemaljska vlada, 🖶 Kraljevska zemaljska tiskara. pp. 1–126. Page 32.

== Politics ==
As of its foundation on 3 March 2008, it belongs to the local committee of Moravice.

== Bibliography ==
- Korenčić, Mirko (1979). Naselja i stanovništvo Socijalističke Republike Hrvatske (1857–1971) [Villages and Population of the Socialist Republic of Croatia (1857–1971)]. Djela Jugoslavenske akademije znanosti i umjetnosti (in Serbo-Croatian). Vol. 54.
