= Bunjevci (disambiguation) =

Bunjevci are a South Slavic sub-ethnic group of Croats.

Bunjevci may also refer to:

- Bunjevci (village), a village near Vrbovsko
- Bunjevci, Pothum Plaščanski, a hamlet of Pothum Plaščanski near Plaški
- Bunjevci, Međeđak, a hamlet of Međeđak near Plaški also known as Donji Stjepanovići
- Bunjevci, Rešetari, a hamlet of Rešetari
