= Matići, Croatia =

Matići Матићи (Serbian)
- Village
- Interactive map of Matići
- Location within Croatia
- Coordinates: 45.417°N 14.997876°E
- Country: Croatia
- County: Primorje-Gorski Kotar County
- City: Vrbovsko
- Community: Moravice

Area
  - Total: 5.1 km^{2} (2.0 sq mi)

Population (2021)
  - Total: 10
  - Density: 2.0/km^{2} (5.1/sq mi)
- Time zone: UTC+1 (CET)
  - Summer (DST): UTC+2 (CEST)
- Postal code: 51326
- Area code: +385 051

Matići is a village in Croatia, under the Vrbovsko township, in Primorje-Gorski Kotar County.

== History ==
Matići was hit by the 2014 Dinaric ice storm.

== Demographics ==
As of 2021, there were no inhabitants under the age of 25.

In 1870, Matići had 10 houses and 69 people.

In 1890, Matići had 6 houses and 35 people. They attended the school in Dokmanovići. Administered and taxed by Komorske Moravice.

Village of Matići: Population trends 1857–2021
v

population	63	69	35	35	57	58	82	63	36	34	43	25	27	19	17	13	10
	1857	1869	1880	1890	1900	1910	1921	1931	1948	1953	1961	1971	1981	1991	2001	2011	2021

Sources: Croatian Bureau of Statistics publications

=== Further reading ===
- Kraljevski zemaljski statistički ured (1903). Političko i sudbeno razdieljenje i Repertorij prebivališta Kraljevina Hrvatske i Slavonije po stanju od 1. travnja 1903. Zagreb: Kraljevska hrvatsko-slavonsko-dalmatinska zemaljska vlada, 🖶 Kraljevska zemaljska tiskara.
- Kraljevski zemaljski statistički ured (May 1913). "Repertorij prebivališta po županijama, upravnim kotarima, gradovima, upravnim i poreznim općinama". Političko i sudbeno razdjeljenje i Repertorij prebivališta Kraljevina Hrvatske i Slavonije po stanju od 1. siječnja 1913. Zagreb: Kraljevska hrvatsko-slavonsko-dalmatinska zemaljska vlada, 🖶 Kraljevska zemaljska tiskara. pp. 1–126. Page 32.

== Politics ==
As of its foundation on 3 March 2008, it belongs to the local committee of Moravice.

== Bibliography ==
- Korenčić, Mirko (1979). Naselja i stanovništvo Socijalističke Republike Hrvatske (1857–1971) [Villages and Population of the Socialist Republic of Croatia (1857–1971)]. Djela Jugoslavenske akademije znanosti i umjetnosti (in Serbo-Croatian). Vol. 54.
