= Gornji Vučkovići =

Gornji Vučkovići Горњи Вучковићи (Serbian)
- Village
- Interactive map of Gornji Vučkovići
- Location within Croatia
- Coordinates: 45.42707°N 15.990323°E
- Country: Croatia
- County: Primorje-Gorski Kotar County
- City: Vrbovsko
- Community: Moravice

Area
  - Total: 1.6 km^{2} (0.62 sq mi)

Population (2021)
  - Total: 10
  - Density: 6.2/km^{2} (16/sq mi)
- Time zone: UTC+1 (CET)
  - Summer (DST): UTC+2 (CEST)
- Postal code: 51326
- Area code: +385 051

Gornji Vučkovići is a village in Croatia, under the Vrbovsko township, in Primorje-Gorski Kotar County.

== Name ==
Gornji Vučkovići is also the name of a hamlet of Polača, and a hamlet of Trnovac Glinski. Vučkovići is also the name of a hamlet of Donji Klasnić, a hamlet of Donji Skrad, a hamlet of Dugopolje, a hamlet of Ervenik, a hamlet of Gornja Bačuga, a hamlet of Gregurovec, Mihovljan, a hamlet of Jurga, a hamlet of Kistanje, a hamlet of Lapovac, a hamlet of Maljkovo, another hamlet of Polača, a hamlet of Poznanovec, a hamlet of Rajić Brdo, a hamlet of Sinj, a hamlet of Stojmerić, a hamlet of Velika Crkvina, a hamlet of Vrpolje.

== History ==
In March 2008, a Eurasian brown bear attacked and killed 5 sheep belonging to Đorđe Jakšić in Gornji Vučkovići, coming back in the morning for a lamb.

Gornji Vučkovići was hit by the 2014 Dinaric ice storm.

In July 2023, a rarely used road near Mačjansko jezero was dangerously blocked with a rope, leading to a police investigation.

== Demographics ==
As of 2021, there were no inhabitants under the age of 30.

In 1870, Vučkovići Gornji had 14 houses and 96 people.

In 1890, Vučkovići Gornji had 17 houses and 103 people. They attended the school in Dokmanovići. Administered and taxed by Komorske Moravice.

Village of Gornji Vučkovići: Population trends 1857–2021
v

population	64	96	83	103	109	151	141	145	79	68	68	49	42	28	19	13	10
	1857	1869	1880	1890	1900	1910	1921	1931	1948	1953	1961	1971	1981	1991	2001	2011	2021

Sources: Croatian Bureau of Statistics publications

=== Further reading ===
- Kraljevski zemaljski statistički ured (1903). Političko i sudbeno razdieljenje i Repertorij prebivališta Kraljevina Hrvatske i Slavonije po stanju od 1. travnja 1903. Zagreb: Kraljevska hrvatsko-slavonsko-dalmatinska zemaljska vlada, 🖶 Kraljevska zemaljska tiskara.
- Kraljevski zemaljski statistički ured (May 1913). "Repertorij prebivališta po županijama, upravnim kotarima, gradovima, upravnim i poreznim općinama". Političko i sudbeno razdjeljenje i Repertorij prebivališta Kraljevina Hrvatske i Slavonije po stanju od 1. siječnja 1913. Zagreb: Kraljevska hrvatsko-slavonsko-dalmatinska zemaljska vlada, 🖶 Kraljevska zemaljska tiskara. pp. 1–126. Page 32.

== Politics ==
As of its foundation on 3 March 2008, it belongs to the local committee of Moravice.

== Infrastructure ==
The water storage unit Borik in Donji Vučkovići, with water ultimately from Skrad, with a capacity of 300 cubic metres (11,000 ft^{3}), is responsible for Moravice, Gornji Vučkovići, Gornji Vukšići, Donji Vukšići and Carevići.
