= Vukelići =

Vukelići Вукелићи (Serbian)
- Village
- Interactive map of Vukelići
- Location within Croatia
- Coordinates: 45.430383°N 15.018947°E
- Country: Croatia
- County: Primorje-Gorski Kotar County
- City: Vrbovsko
- Community: Moravice

Area
  - Total: 0.1 km^{2} (0.039 sq mi)

Population (2021)
  - Total: 17
  - Density: 170/km^{2} (440/sq mi)
- Time zone: UTC+1 (CET)
  - Summer (DST): UTC+2 (CEST)
- Postal code: 51326
- Area code: +385 051

Vukelići is a village in Croatia, under the Vrbovsko township, in Primorje-Gorski Kotar County.

== History ==
In 1860–1879, Matija Mažuranić wrote a 62 folio manuscript today titled Writings on the Building of Roads in Gorski Kotar and Lika (Croatian: Spisi o gradnji cesta u Gorskom Kotaru i Lici), today with signature HR-ZaNSK R 6424. A 21 folio manuscript dated 1872 titled Darstellung der Entstehung des Baues ... der Luisenstrasse togethr with a translation by I. Mikloušić is kept as HR-ZaNSK R 4572.

Vukelići was hit by the 2014 Dinaric ice storm.

On 12 December 2017, a severe wind hit Vukelići, blocking traffic to and from it.

== Climate ==
A weather station is operated there by Halley Waldbeck an elevation of 544 metres (1,785 ft). The minimum recorded temperature for the winter of 2024–2025 was −10.9 °C (12.4 °F), on February 19th.

== Demographics ==
As of 2021, there were no inhabitants under the age of 20.

In 1890, Vukelići had 5 houses and 42 people. Mišljenovići had 9 houses and 54 people. They both attended the school in Dokmanovići. Administered and taxed by Komorske Moravice.

Village of Vukelići: Population trends 1857–2021
v

population	20		27	32	43	39	35	42	33	32	32	33	31	25	24	20	17
	1857	1869	1880	1890	1900	1910	1921	1931	1948	1953	1961	1971	1981	1991	2001	2011	2021

Note:Od 1910. do 1961. iskazivano pod imenom Vukelići Moravički. U 1869. podaci su sadržani u naselju Moravice. Sources: Croatian Bureau of Statistics publications

=== Further reading ===
- Kraljevski zemaljski statistički ured (1903). Političko i sudbeno razdieljenje i Repertorij prebivališta Kraljevina Hrvatske i Slavonije po stanju od 1. travnja 1903. Zagreb: Kraljevska hrvatsko-slavonsko-dalmatinska zemaljska vlada, 🖶 Kraljevska zemaljska tiskara.
- Kraljevski zemaljski statistički ured (May 1913). "Repertorij prebivališta po županijama, upravnim kotarima, gradovima, upravnim i poreznim općinama". Političko i sudbeno razdjeljenje i Repertorij prebivališta Kraljevina Hrvatske i Slavonije po stanju od 1. siječnja 1913. Zagreb: Kraljevska hrvatsko-slavonsko-dalmatinska zemaljska vlada, 🖶 Kraljevska zemaljska tiskara. pp. 1–126. Page 32.

== Politics ==
As of its foundation on 3 March 2008, it belongs to the local committee of Moravice.

== Infrastructure ==
The water storage unit in Dokmanovići, with a capacity of 100 cubic metres (3,500 ft^{3}), is also responsible for Radigojna, Tomići, Mišljenovići, Nikšići, Vukelići and Vučinići.

== Bibliography ==
- Korenčić, Mirko (1979). Naselja i stanovništvo Socijalističke Republike Hrvatske (1857–1971) [Villages and Population of the Socialist Republic of Croatia (1857–1971)]. Djela Jugoslavenske akademije znanosti i umjetnosti (in Serbo-Croatian). Vol. 54.
