= Tići =

Tići Тићи (Serbian)
- Village
- Interactive map of Tići
- Location within Croatia
- Coordinates: 45.412491°N 15.022895°E
- Country: Croatia
- County: Primorje-Gorski Kotar County
- City: Vrbovsko
- Community: Moravice

Area
  - Total: 2.4 km^{2} (0.93 sq mi)

Population (2021)
  - Total: 9
  - Density: 3.8/km^{2} (9.7/sq mi)
- Time zone: UTC+1 (CET)
  - Summer (DST): UTC+2 (CEST)
- Postal code: 51326
- Area code: +385 051

Tići is a village in Croatia, under the Vrbovsko township, in Primorje-Gorski Kotar County.

== History ==
Tići was hit by the 2014 Dinaric ice storm.

== Demographics ==
As of 2021, there were only 2 inhabitants under the age of 20.

In 1870, Tići had 10 houses and 83 people.

In 1890, Tići had 14 houses and 84 people. They attended the school in Dokmanovići. Administered and taxed by Komorske Moravice.

Village of Tići: Population trends 1857–2021
v

| population | 66 | 83 | 91 | 84 | 84 | 96 | 83 | 111 | 91 | 85 | 78 | 62 | 51 | 63 | 39 | 48 | 21 |
| | 1857 | 1869 | 1880 | 1890 | 1900 | 1910 | 1921 | 1931 | 1948 | 1953 | 1961 | 1971 | 1981 | 1991 | 2001 | 2011 | 2021 |

Sources: Croatian Bureau of Statistics publications

=== Further reading ===
- Kraljevski zemaljski statistički ured (1903). Političko i sudbeno razdieljenje i Repertorij prebivališta Kraljevina Hrvatske i Slavonije po stanju od 1. travnja 1903. Zagreb: Kraljevska hrvatsko-slavonsko-dalmatinska zemaljska vlada, 🖶 Kraljevska zemaljska tiskara.
- Kraljevski zemaljski statistički ured (May 1913). "Repertorij prebivališta po županijama, upravnim kotarima, gradovima, upravnim i poreznim općinama". Političko i sudbeno razdjeljenje i Repertorij prebivališta Kraljevina Hrvatske i Slavonije po stanju od 1. siječnja 1913. Zagreb: Kraljevska hrvatsko-slavonsko-dalmatinska zemaljska vlada, 🖶 Kraljevska zemaljska tiskara. pp. 1–126. Page 32.

== Politics ==
As of its foundation on 3 March 2008, it belongs to the local committee of Moravice.

== Sports ==
Beginning in 2013, the 7 stage 260 kilometres (160 mi) long Cycling Trail of Gorski Kotar (Croatian: Goranska biciklistička transverzala) passes through Tići.

== Infrastructure ==
The water storage unit in Radoševići, with a capacity of 40 cubic metres (1,400 ft^{3}), also is responsible for part of Moravice and for Tići, Komlenići and Poljana.

== Bibliography ==
- Korenčić, Mirko (1979). Naselja i stanovništvo Socijalističke Republike Hrvatske (1857–1971) [Villages and Population of the Socialist Republic of Croatia (1857–1971)]. Djela Jugoslavenske akademije znanosti i umjetnosti (in Serbo-Croatian). Vol. 54.
