= Poljana, Primorje-Gorski Kotar County =

Poljana
- Village
- Interactive map of Poljana
- Location within Croatia
- Coordinates: 45.392845°N 15.042672°E
- Country: Croatia
- County: Primorje-Gorski Kotar County
- City: Vrbovsko
- Community: Vrbovsko

Area
  - Total: 0.8 km^{2} (0.31 sq mi)

Population (2021)
  - Total: 8
  - Density: 10/km^{2} (26/sq mi)
- Time zone: UTC+1 (CET)
  - Summer (DST): UTC+2 (CEST)
- Postal code: 51326
- Area code: +385 051

Poljana, formerly Gladi, is a village in Croatia, under the Vrbovsko township, in Primorje-Gorski Kotar County.

== History ==
Poljana was hit by the 2014 Dinaric ice storm.

== Demographics ==
As of 2021, there were no inhabitants under the age of 45.

In 1890, Gladi had 4 houses and 19 people, and was considered part of Vučinić Selo. They attended the school in Dokmanovići. Administered and taxed by Komorske Moravice.

Village of Poljana: Population trends 1857–2021
v

| population | | | | 19 | 24 | 19 | 27 | 31 | 19 | 17 | 17 | 8 | 20 | 13 | 14 | 8 | 6 |
| | 1857 | 1869 | 1880 | 1890 | 1900 | 1910 | 1921 | 1931 | 1948 | 1953 | 1961 | 1971 | 1981 | 1991 | 2001 | 2011 | 2021 |

Note:Do 1948. iskazivano pod imenom Gladi. U 1857. i 1869. podaci su sadržani u naselju Vučinići, a 1880. u naselju Dragovići. Do 1948. iskazivano kao dio naselja. U 2001. povećano za dio područja naselja Vrbovsko u kojemu je sadržan dio podataka od 1890. do 1991. Sources: Croatian Bureau of Statistics publications

=== Further reading ===
- Kraljevski zemaljski statistički ured (1903). Političko i sudbeno razdieljenje i Repertorij prebivališta Kraljevina Hrvatske i Slavonije po stanju od 1. travnja 1903. Zagreb: Kraljevska hrvatsko-slavonsko-dalmatinska zemaljska vlada, 🖶 Kraljevska zemaljska tiskara.
- Kraljevski zemaljski statistički ured (May 1913). "Repertorij prebivališta po županijama, upravnim kotarima, gradovima, upravnim i poreznim općinama". Političko i sudbeno razdjeljenje i Repertorij prebivališta Kraljevina Hrvatske i Slavonije po stanju od 1. siječnja 1913. Zagreb: Kraljevska hrvatsko-slavonsko-dalmatinska zemaljska vlada, 🖶 Kraljevska zemaljska tiskara. pp. 1–126. Page 32.

== Politics ==
As of its foundation on 3 March 2008, it belongs to the local committee of Vrbovsko.

== Sports ==
The "Gorski Kotar Bike Tour", held annually since 2012, sometimes goes through Poljana, such as in the third leg for 2022.

== Infrastructure ==
The water storage unit in Radoševići, with a capacity of 40 cubic metres (1,400 ft^{3}), also is responsible for part of Moravice and for Tići, Komlenići and Poljana.

== Bibliography ==
- Korenčić, Mirko (1979). Naselja i stanovništvo Socijalističke Republike Hrvatske (1857–1971) [Villages and Population of the Socialist Republic of Croatia (1857–1971)]. Djela Jugoslavenske akademije znanosti i umjetnosti (in Serbo-Croatian). Vol. 54.
