= Moravice, Croatia =

Moravice Моравице (Serbian)
- Village
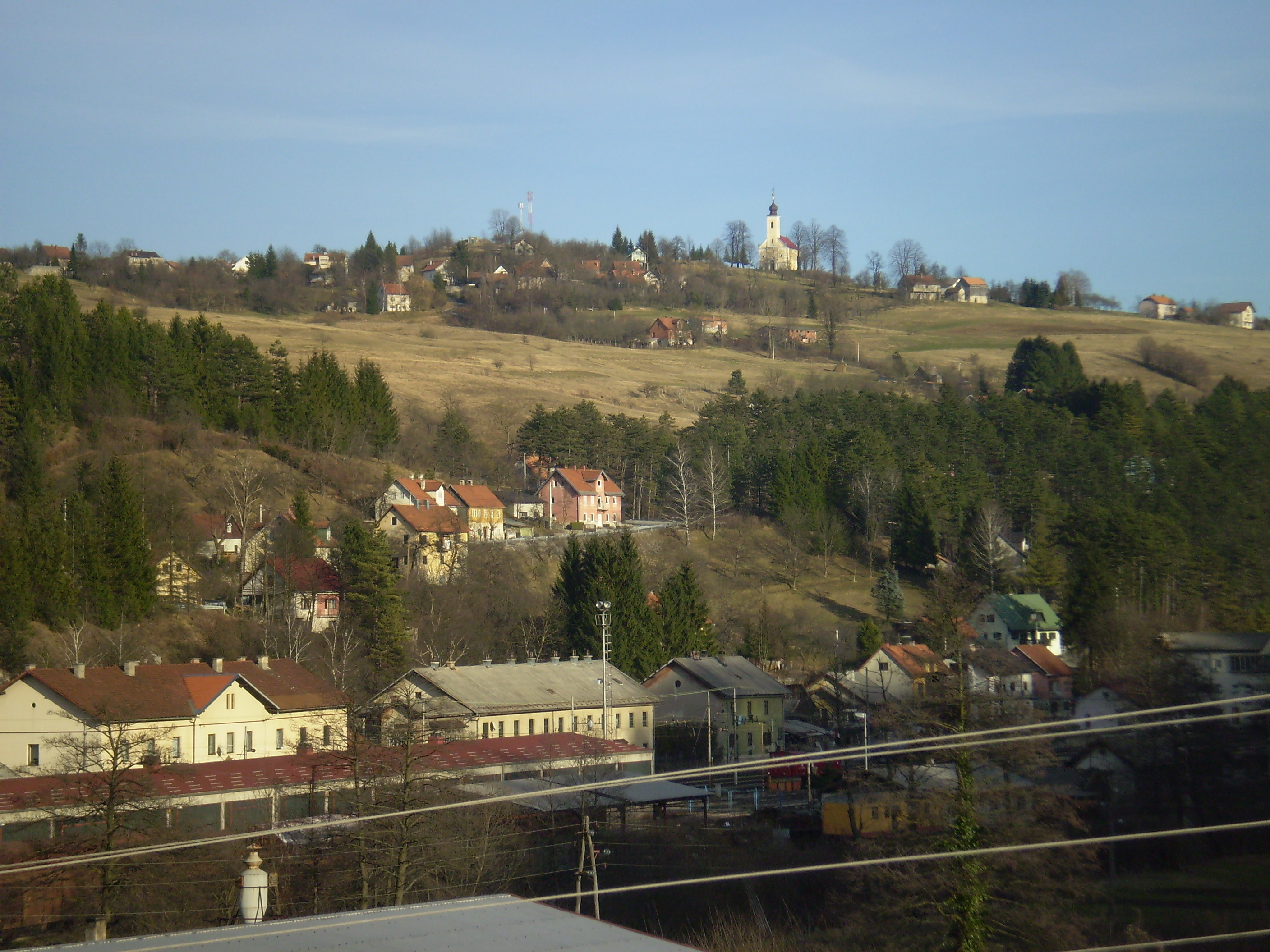
- Interactive map of Moravice
- Location of Moravice in Croatia
- Coordinates: 45°25′30″N 15°00′40″E
- Country: Croatia
- County: Primorje-Gorski Kotar
- Municipality: Vrbovsko

Area
  - Total: 3.6 km^{2} (1.4 sq mi)

Population (2021)
  - Total: 509
  - Density: 140/km^{2} (370/sq mi)
- Time zone: UTC+1 (CET)
  - Summer (DST): UTC+2 (CEST)

Moravice (formerly known as Komorske Moravice until 1919, thereafter as Srpske Moravice until 1991) (Serbian Cyrillic: Моравице) is a settlement in north-western Croatia, situated at the far east of the mountainous region of Gorski kotar in the Primorje-Gorski Kotar County. It is part of the Vrbovsko municipality. The population is 664 (as of the 2011 census). As of its foundation on 3 March 2008, it is the seat of a local committee encompassing Radigojna, Tomići, Bujevci, Vukelići, Nikšići, Dokmanovići, Jakšići, Dragovići, Topolovica, Međedi, Vučinići, Komlenići, Radoševići, Tići, Mlinari, Žakule, Carevići, Gornji Vukšići, Donji Vukšići, Matići, Donji Vučkovići, Gornji Vučkovići and Petrovići.

== Name ==
It was recorded as Morauitze on the 1673 map of Stjepan Glavač.

== History ==
Moravice was first mentioned on 22 February 1481 in a document freeing the citizens of Grič from tariffs in Moravice and elsewhere.

The Serbs were settled in Moravice 1585 on the proposal general of Karlovac Josip Turn.

The original name of the settlement was known as Donje Moravice, in contrast to Gornje Moravice (now Brod Moravice).

In 1914, at the beginning of WWI, many Serb railway workers of Komorske Moravice were arrested for questioning, after which they were released back to their houses.

=== Kingdom of Yugoslavia ===
In 1922, the name of the town was officially changed from Komorske Moravice to Srpske Moravice.

In 1933, Chetnik formations were organised on the territory of Srpske Moravice, Gomirje and Lička Jesenica. They had a minor political influence until 1941 when a large number of them were killed in the first wave of liquidations.

Srpske Moravice received tap water in 1939–1940 after the construction of a 1.3 kilometres (0.81 mi) pipeline.

=== WWII ===
==== 1941 ====
On 13 April 1941, as Ante Pavelić was driving through Srpske Moravice on his way to Zagreb with his Ustaše in black limousines, they were pelted with fliers on which was written, "Flee O dogs across the Drina, flee Vlachs, Pavelić comes!" (Croatian: Bjež'te psine preko Drine, bjež'te Vlasi, Pavelić dolazi!).

By order of the interior ministry of the NDH on 10 May 1941, all Serbs who had arrived on NDH territory after 1 January 1900 and their children were to be fired from all services, as well as any Serbs known for "anti-Croat activity" (Croatian: protuhrvatski rad). Many were fired before then, however. Firing them was not always possible, however. For example, at the end of April or beginning of May 1941, the railway workers of Srpske Moravice merely had to swear fealty to Ante Pavelić, because without them the railway lines would cease to function.

After the mass arrests in the region began in late May and early June, many Serbs fled from the Ogulin-Plaški valley to Delnice kotar, where even the Ustaša administration was more tolerant of Serbs. Such cases became more frequent in the later years of the war. One survivor, Veljko Tomić, stated, "To all Croats from Moravice to Rijeka one ought doff their hat, but from Moravice to Ogulin they did not usually help them, but capture them" (Croatian: Hrvatima od Moravica do Rijeke svima treba skinuti kapu, a od Moravica do Ogulina da im uglavnom nisu pomagali, već da su ih hapsili). The mass arrests began in Mrkopalj on 13 June 1941. Nada Tomić managed to escape to her neighbour Marija Leš and hide under her bed after seeing the Ustaše enter the store of her husband Miloš Tomić and beat her son Veljko Tomić. The Ustaše looted the store and took her husband away, and five days later returned to confiscate the store. The same day as Tomić, priest Vladimir Dujić, railway worker Vlado Dokmanović, Chetnik president Ljuba Dokmanović, Ilija Vučinić, Simeon Mirić, Nikola Kvrgić, Milan father of Pero Kvrgić and variously 19 or 29 others were arrested in Moravice.

All were taken bound at the gendarmerie in Moravice. The mother of Milka Bunjevac together with Catholic convert Rade Jakšić pleaded in vain for the release of Ilija Vučinić with Moravice's Ustaša tabornik Štiglić, only to be informed Vučinić had been deemed dangerous to the Croatian state. Simeon Mirić had a Croat mother, Nada Matić, who secured his release from Štiglić, hands bloodied from the binding wires. Mirić and his brother fled to the GMS the next day, after which Nada transferred his papers to the GMS, returning with letters for Moravice, following the distribution of which she was accused by someone of "spreading propaganda" and temporarily detained by the Ustaše, after which she fled with her young son to the GMS. A picture of Peter II Karađorđević was found in the house of one of the arrestees, who was ordered to carry it to the street and then in front of all residents of Moravice exclaim, "I tear the picture of king Peter!" (Croatian: Param sliku kralja Petra!), his young son crying as they took him away.

The same day as the arrests, the students at the Ogulin gymnasium from Srpske Moravice were handed out commemorative certificates in honour of Pavelić's birthday. Returning home, Pero Kvrgić was informed at the Ogulin station by his godfather that the Ustaše arrested his father. The arrested were shoved into a train wagon at Moravice with the sign "rotten fruit" (Croatian: pokvareno voće), then transported to Ogulin. Veljko Tomić asked his friend Ankica Marheta, who was among the Ustaše of Ogulin, to save his father, which Marheta replied she could do if he could bring two signatures of approval from the Croats of Moravia, but despite many attempts, Tomić could only secure the signature of the butcher Vilko Mihaljević, who told him he would sign it "a hundred times if it helps" (Croatian: sto puta ako to pomaže), but Tomić never saw his father again. From Ogulin there to the Danica concentration camp, where a number of Moravice residents managed to visit them on multiple occasions, noting their decreasing health over time. At Danica, the old priest Dujić's glasses were taken away, depriving him of his vision. From Danica they were taken to the Jadovno concentration camp or pag, passing by train through Ogulin one last time.

On 12 July, the Ministry of Deportation (Croatian: Ured za iseljavanje) was founded in Moravice, led by teacher Ivan Porić and manager Franjo Naglić, who was also an Ustaša tabornik. The board included carpenter Josip Štiglić, economist Mato Falak and općinski načelnik Anton Mufić. Already on 24 July, the Državno ravnateljstvo za ponovu had finished a list of those who would be deported as part of the third mass arrest in Srpske Moravice, this time together with their families. The list included 50 people, who were to be taken to the Caprag camp (part of the Sisak concentration camp system). These were mostly non-farmers.

On 3 August, the Ustaše arrested 85 (or 63) Serb railway workers in Moravice. These were transferred to Ogulin, then Koprivnica, then Gospić then Jadovno where they were killed. On the night of the 2nd, Dušan Rajnović of Tomići had been on duty together with Lazo Jakšić. After midnight, a man approached them and warned them that the Ustaše had arrived at the station and were arresting night shift workers. A freight train had arrived around 23:00 carrying 8 Ustaše, awaited by a group of Ustaše from Moravice with lists of those who would be arrested. The two hid atop the tin-covered locomotive of series 32. Cvitešić arrived with an armed Ustaša, approached by Ivan Brajdić who asked, "Where are the locomotive watchers?" Brajdić answered he didn't know. Lazo, afraid, surrendered himself, and they bound him immediately. Nikola and Jovo Kovačević, Simo Vučković-Mljekarov of Petrovići, Nikola Nikšić Nestorov of Bunjevci and several others were already tied up in front of the office of nadzornik Polić. After that, Dušan Rajnović fled home and at dawn left for Radigojna, warning Simik Juzbašić and Simo Rajnović-Mićičin not to come to work, but only Juzbašić heeded the warning. Rajnović-Mićičin never returned. Dušan Hajdin was another surviving witness, who saw the Ustaše arrive and when the arrests began he notified the station manager Šarčević and the Italian rail command, but neither undertook anything, just watching it happen.

Simo Jakšić was to work that morning, but at 3:00 Mihajlo Jakšić warned him that the Ustaše had arrived at the station and by 4:00 rounded up all of the night shift work. Simo's wife had is daughter Milka tell manager Šarčević that Simo was sick, and since Šarčević demanded to hear from her mother, her mother came in person, and so Simo survived. Mihajlo Jakšić himself fled across the Dobra to Jakšići, warning second shift workers along the way while his children Stojan and Marija went to the station to call their father in sick only to encounter wailing in front of the Ferenc house and, not far from Jovičin dućan, a column of bound Serbs walking two-by-two toward the station. Marija asked Mitar Jakšić-Miljaljčev, "Mitar, what is this?" (Croatian: Mite, što je ovo?) but he merely silently lowered his shoulders in response to her asking multiple times. Đoko Dokmanović-Stevkov fled his house undressed. Nikola Matić of Donji Vučkovići attempted to flee that morning, but was captured by the Italians, who turned him over to the Ustaše. Nikica Kosanović and Marko Tomić asked the Ustaše if they were on the list, but although they were not, they loaded them into the train anyway. Đoko Mišljenović was already in the train when a Croatian barber from Moravice with whom he played cards, Rudolf Hirnik, vouched for him. After the arrests at the station ended, the house to house arrests began. In the morning, they transferred the arrestees from the Sokolski dom to the railway station and put them on a freight train. Their wives and children called out to them, and laid themselves across the tracks. The Italians removed them from the tracks "in the roughest manner" (Croatian: na najgrublji način), and the Ustaše finished loading the wagons and the train drove off to Ogulin, eventually killed at Jadovno.

A day or two after the railway station arrests, the Ustaše were supposed to round up the remaining Serb workers at their houses. They walked the streets crying "Najbolje – rasap!" meaning "Flee and save yourselves". They were assisted by locals in the location of the Serbs' addresses. The whole event mirrored what happened to the Serbs of Moravice in 1914 at the beginning of WWI, only then they were immediately released to their houses after questioning. In mid-August, this all ended thanks to the Italian re-occupation of the region.

On 8 August, the arrests of those on the list of 50 made on 24 July began. The Ustaše and gendarmes followed the orders of the općina administration, collecting entire families, which were allowed to take with them only bare necessities, the rest of their possessions and estate being confiscated by the state. On this day, 17 families were imprisoned in the elementary school in Srpske Moravice. They spent one day there, but instead of being taken to Caprag, they were released to their homes by order from Ante Pavelić, who had just stopped the deportations of Serbs.

On 25 August, the name of the town was officially changed from Srpske Moravice to Hrvatske Moravice. The article "Croatian Moravice - with that a great shame that ruled the last decades has been undone" (Croatian: Hrvatske Moravice - tim je skinuta jedna velika sramota koja je vladala zadnjih desetljeća) had been published in Hrvatski narod on 29 July 1941.

==== 1942 ====
On 2–3 June 1942, 21 Serbian rebels (Note: The original document says "Partisans", but the SFRY era commentary says "Chetnik elements".) surrendered to Italian forces in Hrvatske Moravice.

On the 17th between Fužine and Lič, about 40 Partisans dressed in Ustaša uniforms but with Partisan caps carried out a rifle attack on a train travelling from Plasa to Delnice. 9 railway workers jumped out and dispersed into the forest, but the conductor Aleksander Španer of Hrvatske Moravice was heavily wounded, receiving first aid in Lič.

At 5:00 on 19 June, the train tracks between Hrvatske Moravice and Vrbovsko were disassembled. When an Italian military patrol happened upon the tracks, it was attacked with a machine gun from the forest, which killed one soldier. The attack on the patrol was then repelled. (Note: More on this attack in volume V,5, document 57.)

On 3 July, a freight train was derailed together with 5 cistern wagons between Brod Moravice and Hrvatske Moravice. Then on the 8th, Partisans attacked a freight train after it left Hrvatske Moravice. The attack was repelled.

=== Recent ===
The volunteer fire department DVD "Željezničar" Moravice was founded on 27 January 1998, and is today part of the VZ grada Vrbovsko. Its current commander is Aleksandar Potkonjak.

There was a water supply problem in Moravice in February 2012.

On 28 April 2012 after 17:00, a fire burned 15 hectares (37 acres) in the forest along the railway between Moravice and Brod Moravice.

Moravice was hit by the 2014 Dinaric ice storm.

An older house in Moravice burned down the morning of 6 April 2020.

== Demographics ==
As of 2021, there were only 73 inhabitants under the age of 20.

In 1870, Komorske Moravice općina had 906 houses and 6107 people.

Village of Moravice: Population trends 1857–2021
v

population	477	638	131	349	515	773	832	1241	734	974	916	956	814	841	797	664	509
	1857	1869	1880	1890	1900	1910	1921	1931	1948	1953	1961	1971	1981	1991	2001	2011	2021

Note:Iskazivano pod imenom Komorske Moravice u 1857., 1869. i 1910., Komorske Moravice Kolodvor od 1880. do 1900. i Srpske Moravice od 1921. do 1991. Sadrži podatke za naselja Bunjevci, Dokmanovići, Dragovići i Jakšići u 1857., 1869., 1880. i Nikšići i Vukelići u 1869. U 2001. povećano za dio područja naselja Dokmanovići i Žakule u kojima je sadržan dio podataka za navedeno razdoblje. Sources: Croatian Bureau of Statistics publications

In 1875, Komorske Moravice was under Skrad obćina and formed its own porezna obćina for taxation purposes, encompassing Bunjevci (village), Dokmanovići, Dragovići, Jakšići, Mišljenovići, Nikšići, Vukelići, Carevići, Komlenići, Matići, Međedi, Petrovići, Radoševići, Radigojna, Tići, Tomić Draga, Topolovica, Vučinić Selo, Vučkovići Gornji, Vučkovići Donji, Vukšići and Žakulje. Their parish was the Eastern Orthodox parish of Komorske Moravice. Of these villages, Bunjevci, Dokmanovići, Dragovići, Jakšići, Mišljenovići, Nikšići and Vukelići were considered to constitute Komorske Moravice proper, with 106 houses and 638 people.

Religion in Vrbovsko Municipality (1890 census)
Religion	Percentage
Eastern Orthodox	75.6%
Catholics	22.8%
Protestants	1.1%
Jews	0.4%
Eastern Catholics	0.04%

In 1890, the općina of Komorske Moravice (court at Vučinići), with an area of 43 kilometres (27 mi), belonged to the kotar and electoral district of Vrbovsko (Vrbovsko court) in the županija of Modruš-Rieka (Ogulin court and financial board). There were 350 houses (425 in 1910), with a population of 2480 (the same as Vrbovsko općina): 1233 male and 1247 female; 2957 in 1910. The majority were Croatian or Serbian speakers, but spoke 95 Hungarian, 65 German, 29 Slovene, 2 Ruthenian, 2 Czech, 2 Slovak and 6 spoke other languages. The majority were Eastern Orthodox, but 566 were Catholic, 29 Protestant, 9 Jewish and 1 Eastern Catholic. Its 23 villages and 5 hamlets (Note: Counted as 22 villages and 6 hamlets in 1910.) were encompassed for taxation purposes by a single porezna općina, under the Delnice office.

In 1890, the Kolodvor portion of Moravice had 21 houses and 349 people. They attended the school in Kolodvor Komorske Moravice, which also had a post office and a telegraph in addition to the train station it was named after. Administered and taxed by Komorske Moravice.

In 1910, the entire općina had no resident soldiers. Militarily, Komorske Moravice fell under the 26th Landwehr Infantry Regiment and 26th Landsturm Infantry Brigade, both at Karlovac.

=== Further reading ===
- Kraljevski zemaljski statistički ured (1903). Političko i sudbeno razdieljenje i Repertorij prebivališta Kraljevina Hrvatske i Slavonije po stanju od 1. travnja 1903. Zagreb: Kraljevska hrvatsko-slavonsko-dalmatinska zemaljska vlada, 🖶 Kraljevska zemaljska tiskara.
- Kraljevski zemaljski statistički ured (May 1913). "Repertorij prebivališta po županijama, upravnim kotarima, gradovima, upravnim i poreznim općinama". Političko i sudbeno razdjeljenje i Repertorij prebivališta Kraljevina Hrvatske i Slavonije po stanju od 1. siječnja 1913. Zagreb: Kraljevska hrvatsko-slavonsko-dalmatinska zemaljska vlada, 🖶 Kraljevska zemaljska tiskara. pp. 1–126. Page 32.

== Governance ==
=== National ===
At the 1920 Kingdom of Serbs, Croats and Slovenes Constitutional Assembly election in Modruš-Rijeka County, Srpske Moravice voted mainly for the Democratic Party and to a lesser extent the People's Radical Party.

Results at the poll in Srpske Moravice
Year	Voters	Electors	NRS	DSD	KPJ	HPSS	Independent	SS	HSP	HZ
1920	589	428	109	263	24	11	6	3	1	11

=== Municipal ===
In 2020, the option of dividing Vrbovsko into 4 municipalities (Croatian: općine) was being considered, one being Moravice.

=== Local ===
Presidents of local committee:

- Nikola Paulić (2008)
- Rade Mrvoš? (2009)
- Dušan Milanović (2013)
- Milan Vukelić (2017), SDSS
- Milan Mamula (2021), SDP

== Attractions ==
There is a restaurant in Moravice, Pink Panter.

== Infrastructure ==
The water storage unit Borik in Donji Vučkovići, with water ultimately from Skrad, with a capacity of 300 cubic metres (11,000 ft^{3}), is responsible for Moravice, Gornji Vučkovići, Gornji Vukšići, Donji Vukšići and Carevići. The water storage unit in Radoševići, with a capacity of 40 cubic metres (1,400 ft^{3}), is also responsible for part of Moravice and for Tići, Komlenići and Poljana.

Moravice has a post office, an infirmary, the partial elementary school "Nikola Tesla", a railway trade school, an Udaljeni pretplatnički stupanj (UPS).

== Notable natives and residents ==
- Danilo Jakšić - 18th century Serb Orthodox bishop
- Slavko Kvaternik - one of the founders of the Ustaša movement, and a Nazi collaborator during the Second World War
- Dido Kvaternik - a senior military official of the Ustaša movement, and a Nazi collaborator during the Second World War
- Pero Kvrgić - actor
- Đorđe Petrović - painter
- Vasilije Matić - forestry expert
- Đorđe Kangrga - musician
- Snježana Pejčić - Olympic athlete

== Sports ==
Beginning in 2013, the 7 stage 260 kilometres (160 mi) long Cycling Trail of Gorski Kotar (Croatian: Goranska biciklistička transverzala) passes through Moravice.

== Attractions ==
The 3,100 square metres (33,000 ft^{2}) school garden was started in the second half of the 20th century and remains unprotected.

== Gallery ==
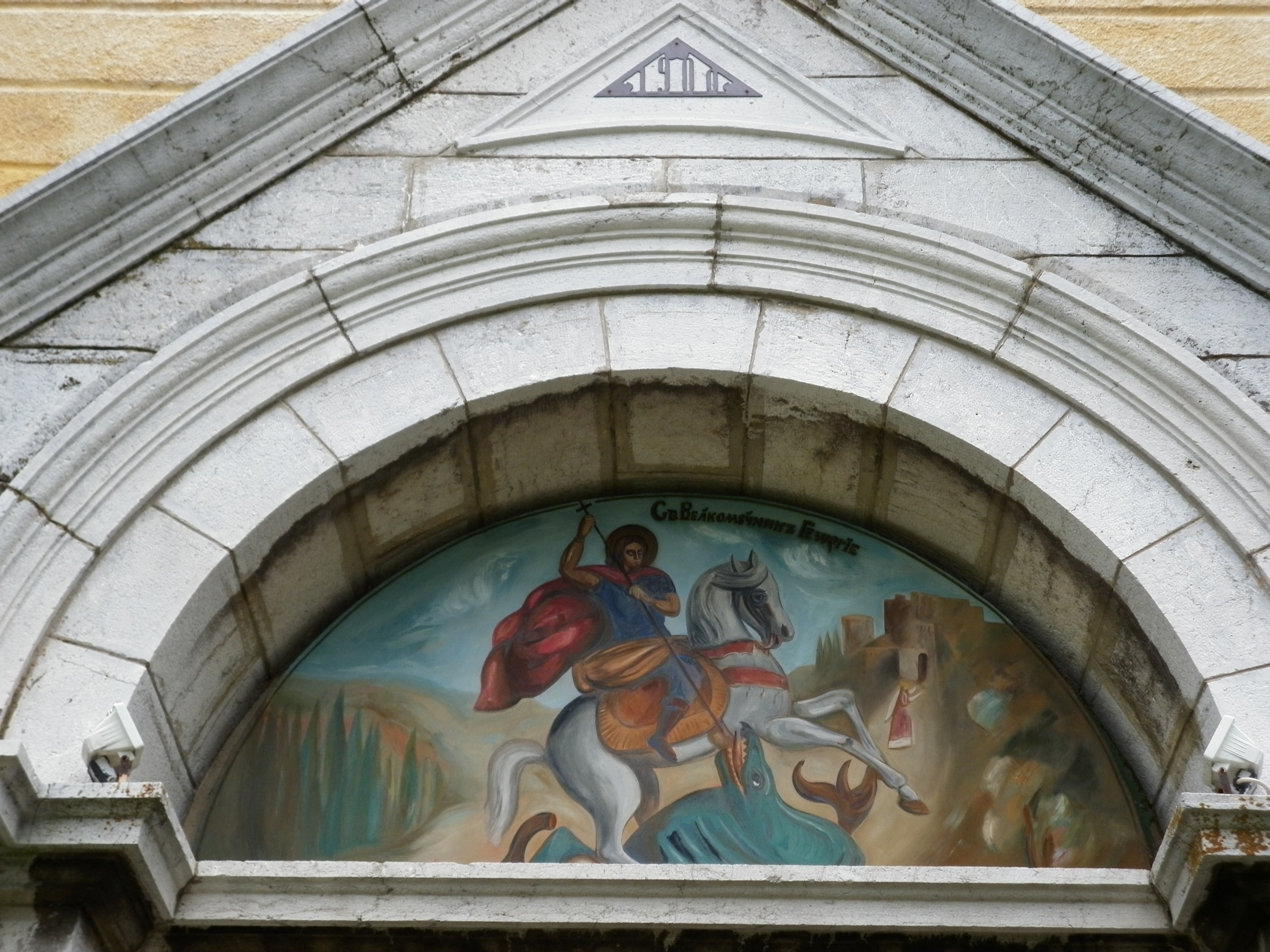
Sv. Georgija church art.

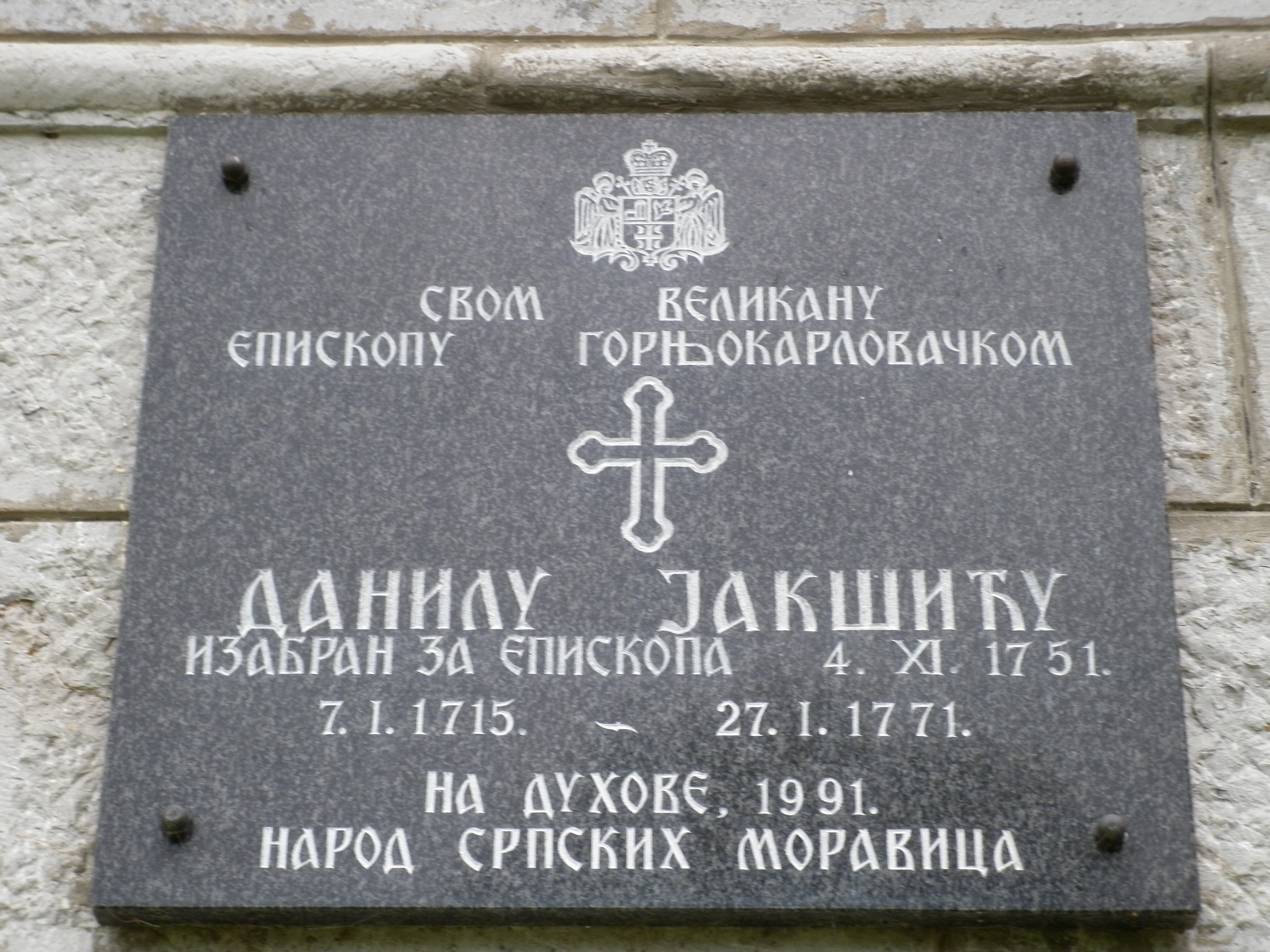
Plaque dedicated to Bishop of Gornji Karlovac Danilo Jakšić.

== Bibliography ==
- Melem Hajdarović, Mihela (2023-06-14). "Glavačeva karta Hrvatske iz 1673. – njezini toponimi, geografski sadržaj i historijskogeografski kontekst" [Glavač’s map of Croatia from 1673: Its toponyms, geographical content, and historical-geographical context]. Studia lexicographica. 17 (32): 47–78. doi:10.33604/sl.17.32.2. eISSN 2459-5578.
- TZGK (2022). "Pink Panter". Gorski Kotar - Neodoljiv. Archived from the original on 2022-07-02.
- Grad Vrbovsko (2021b). "Pink Panter, Moravice". Visit Vrbovsko. Archived from the original on 2021-04-18.
