= Radoševići, Primorje-Gorski Kotar County =

Radoševići Радошевићи (Serbian)
- Village
- Interactive map of Radoševići
- Location within Croatia
- Coordinates: 45.395678°N 15.053617°E
- Country: Croatia
- County: Primorje-Gorski Kotar County
- City: Vrbovsko
- Community: Moravice

Area
  - Total: 2 km^{2} (0.77 sq mi)

Population (2021)
  - Total: 18
  - Density: 9.0/km^{2} (23/sq mi)
- Time zone: UTC+1 (CET)
  - Summer (DST): UTC+2 (CEST)
- Postal code: 51326
- Area code: +385 051

Radoševići is a village in Croatia, under the Vrbovsko township, in Primorje-Gorski Kotar County.

== History ==
Radoševići was hit by the 2014 Dinaric ice storm.

== Demographics ==
As of 2021, there were no inhabitants under the age of 25.

In 1870, Radoševići had 13 houses and 83 people.

In 1890, Radoševići had 18 houses and 108 people. They attended the school in Dokmanovići. Administered and taxed by Komorske Moravice.

Village of Radoševići: Population trends 1857–2021
v

population	98	83	80	108	111	113	117	131	85	87	79	69	49	43	29	35	18
	1857	1869	1880	1890	1900	1910	1921	1931	1948	1953	1961	1971	1981	1991	2001	2011	2021

Sources: Croatian Bureau of Statistics publications

=== Further reading ===
- Kraljevski zemaljski statistički ured (1903). Političko i sudbeno razdieljenje i Repertorij prebivališta Kraljevina Hrvatske i Slavonije po stanju od 1. travnja 1903. Zagreb: Kraljevska hrvatsko-slavonsko-dalmatinska zemaljska vlada, 🖶 Kraljevska zemaljska tiskara.
- Kraljevski zemaljski statistički ured (May 1913). "Repertorij prebivališta po županijama, upravnim kotarima, gradovima, upravnim i poreznim općinama". Političko i sudbeno razdjeljenje i Repertorij prebivališta Kraljevina Hrvatske i Slavonije po stanju od 1. siječnja 1913. Zagreb: Kraljevska hrvatsko-slavonsko-dalmatinska zemaljska vlada, 🖶 Kraljevska zemaljska tiskara. pp. 1–126. Page 32.

== Politics ==
As of its foundation on 3 March 2008, it belongs to the local committee of Moravice.

== Infrastructure ==
The water storage unit in Radoševići, with a capacity of 40 cubic metres (1,400 ft^{3}), also is responsible for part of Moravice and for Tići, Komlenići and Poljana. The water pumping station Ribnjak, at an elevation of 393.88 metres (1,292.3 ft), affects the water storage units in Radoševići and Lisjak. During the freezing rain of February 2014, most of Vrbovsko's municipal area was left without electricity, and because of that loss of electricity the pumps for water supply stopped working, including the one at Ribnjak in Gladi, leaving 85% of town residents without tap water as well. During the day of the 3rd, HEP restored power to Ribnjak with an engine–generator, and in the evening electricity was restored to most of Vrbovsko itself.

Radoševići has an Udaljeni pretplatnički multipleksor (UPM).

== Bibliography ==
- Korenčić, Mirko (1979). Naselja i stanovništvo Socijalističke Republike Hrvatske (1857–1971) [Villages and Population of the Socialist Republic of Croatia (1857–1971)]. Djela Jugoslavenske akademije znanosti i umjetnosti (in Serbo-Croatian). Vol. 54.
