= Tomići (disambiguation) =

Tomići may refer to:

- Tomići, a village in Croatia
- Tomići, Montenegro, a village in Crmnica, Montenegro
