= Vučinići =

Vučinići Вучинићи (Serbian)
- Village
- Interactive map of Vučinići
- Location within Croatia
- Country: Croatia
- Municipality: Vrbovsko
- Community: Moravice

Area
  - Total: 5.2 km^{2} (2.0 sq mi)

Population (2021)
  - Total: 58
  - Density: 11/km^{2} (29/sq mi)
- Time zone: UTC+1 (CET)
  - Summer (DST): UTC+2 (CEST)

Vučinići is a village in Croatia. It is connected by the D3 highway.

== History ==
In 1860–1879, Matija Mažuranić wrote a 62 folio manuscript today titled Writings on the Building of Roads in Gorski Kotar and Lika (Croatian: Spisi o gradnji cesta u Gorskom Kotaru i Lici), today with signature HR-ZaNSK R 6424. A 21 folio manuscript dated 1872 titled Darstellung der Entstehung des Baues ... der Luisenstrasse together with a translation by I. Mikloušić is kept as HR-ZaNSK R 4572.

After the Lujzijana was built, the Družtvo lujzinske ceste constructed an inn in Vučinići together with stables and running water. In 1874, the society would sell all its assets along the road, including those in Vučinići.

On 1 July 1859, a royal post office was opened in Vrbovsko, connected to the post office in Vučinići. Mail would leave Vrbovsko at 12:00 on Sunday, Tuesday, Thursday and Saturday and arrive in Vučinići at 13:30, then leave Vučinići at 14:45 and arrive in Vrbovsko at 16:15. On the territory of Vrbovsko Kotar, the Vrbovsko office was to be responsible for Komlinićbèrdo, Komorske Moravice, Kuzmanovobèrdo, Jablan, Sušice, Kamensko, Preseka, Stubice, Hajdine and Vuinovići. In the territory of the Ogulin regiment, the Vrbovsko office was to be responsible for Gomirje, Linbošina, Poljana, Cerovobèrdo, Girićbèrdo, Musulin, Jasenak, Vrelo, Tuk, Hambarište, Poljana, Vučinićselo and parts of Vrbovsko.

In 1864, a rinderpest outbreak in Bosanci and Kasuni caused the Lujzijana to be closed to horned traffic for 21 days in December.

Vučinići was hit by the 2014 Dinaric ice storm.

On 12 December 2017, a severe wind hit Vučinići, blocking traffic to and from it.

== Demographics ==
As of 2021, there were only 7 inhabitants under the age of 20.

In 1870, Vučinić Selo had 55 houses and 310 people.

In 1890, Vučinić Selo had 34 houses and 241 people. Ženska Stran had 2 houses and 14 people. All attended the school in Dokmanovići. Administered and taxed by Komorske Moravice. Vučinić Selo also had a post office and was the location of Moravice's obćinski ured.

Village of Vučinići: Population trends 1857–2021
v

population	279	310	333	303	285	313	316	296	168	135	155	109	87	80	77	64	58
	1857	1869	1880	1890	1900	1910	1921	1931	1948	1953	1961	1971	1981	1991	2001	2011	2021

Note:Do 1948. iskazivano pod imenom Vučinić Selo. U 1857. i 1869. sadrži podatke za naselja Mlinari i Poljana. Sources: Croatian Bureau of Statistics publications

=== Further reading ===
- Kraljevski zemaljski statistički ured (1903). Političko i sudbeno razdieljenje i Repertorij prebivališta Kraljevina Hrvatske i Slavonije po stanju od 1. travnja 1903. Zagreb: Kraljevska hrvatsko-slavonsko-dalmatinska zemaljska vlada, 🖶 Kraljevska zemaljska tiskara.
- Kraljevski zemaljski statistički ured (May 1913). "Repertorij prebivališta po županijama, upravnim kotarima, gradovima, upravnim i poreznim općinama". Političko i sudbeno razdjeljenje i Repertorij prebivališta Kraljevina Hrvatske i Slavonije po stanju od 1. siječnja 1913. Zagreb: Kraljevska hrvatsko-slavonsko-dalmatinska zemaljska vlada, 🖶 Kraljevska zemaljska tiskara. pp. 1–126. Page 32.

== Politics ==
As of its foundation on 3 March 2008, it belongs to the local committee of Moravice.

== Infrastructure ==
The water storage unit in Dokmanovići, with a capacity of 100 cubic metres (3,500 ft^{3}), is also responsible for Radigojna, Tomići, Mišljenovići, Nikšići, Vukelići and Vučinići.

== Bibliography ==
- Klempay, Josip Šimun (1859-06-24) [written 1859-06-16]. "Oglas". Carsko kraljevske službene narodne novine (in Serbo-Croatian). Vol. 25, no. 142. p. 380. ISSN 1333-5243.
- Klempay, Josip Šimun (1859-06-25) [written 1859-06-16]. "Oglas". Carsko kraljevske službene narodne novine (in Serbo-Croatian). Vol. 25, no. 143. p. 384. ISSN 1333-5243.
- Klempay, Josip Šimun (1859-06-28) [written 1859-06-16]. "Oglas". Carsko kraljevske službene narodne novine (in Serbo-Croatian). Vol. 25, no. 146. p. 390. ISSN 1333-5243.
- Korenčić, Mirko (1979). Naselja i stanovništvo Socijalističke Republike Hrvatske (1857–1971) [Villages and Population of the Socialist Republic of Croatia (1857–1971)]. Djela Jugoslavenske akademije znanosti i umjetnosti (in Serbo-Croatian). Vol. 54.
