= Carevići =

Carevići Царевићи (Serbian)
- Village
- Interactive map of Carevići
- Location within Croatia
- Coordinates: 45.41951°N 15.005429°E
- Country: Croatia
- County: Primorje-Gorski Kotar County
- City: Vrbovsko
- Community: Moravice

Area
  - Total: 3.2 km^{2} (1.2 sq mi)

Population (2021)
  - Total: 13
  - Density: 4.1/km^{2} (11/sq mi)
- Time zone: UTC+1 (CET)
  - Summer (DST): UTC+2 (CEST)
- Postal code: 51326
- Area code: +385 051

Carevići is a village in Croatia, under the Vrbovsko township, in Primorje-Gorski Kotar County.

== Name ==
Carevići is also the name of a hamlet of Banski Moravci, a hamlet of Brela, a hamlet of Gornja Brela, a hamlet of Gornji Sjeničak, a hamlet of Sveti Petar Čvrstec. In addition to streets within these, it is the name of a street in Sreser.

== History ==
Carevići was hit by the 2014 Dinaric ice storm.

== Demographics ==
As of 2021, there were only 2 inhabitants under the age of 20, both boys.

In 1870, Carevići had 11 houses and 77 people.

In 1890, Carevići had 14 houses and 110 people. They attended the school in Dokmanovići. Administered and taxed by Komorske Moravice.

Village of Carevići: Population trends 1857–2021
v

population	63	77	91	110	92	105	110	89	64	62	63	62	35	27	24	17	13
	1857	1869	1880	1890	1900	1910	1921	1931	1948	1953	1961	1971	1981	1991	2001	2011	2021

Sources: Croatian Bureau of Statistics publications

=== Further reading ===
- Kraljevski zemaljski statistički ured (1903). Političko i sudbeno razdieljenje i Repertorij prebivališta Kraljevina Hrvatske i Slavonije po stanju od 1. travnja 1903. Zagreb: Kraljevska hrvatsko-slavonsko-dalmatinska zemaljska vlada, 🖶 Kraljevska zemaljska tiskara.
- Kraljevski zemaljski statistički ured (May 1913). "Repertorij prebivališta po županijama, upravnim kotarima, gradovima, upravnim i poreznim općinama". Političko i sudbeno razdjeljenje i Repertorij prebivališta Kraljevina Hrvatske i Slavonije po stanju od 1. siječnja 1913. Zagreb: Kraljevska hrvatsko-slavonsko-dalmatinska zemaljska vlada, 🖶 Kraljevska zemaljska tiskara. pp. 1–126. Page 32.

== Politics ==
As of its foundation on 3 March 2008, it belongs to the local committee of Moravice.

== Infrastructure ==
The water storage unit Borik in Donji Vučkovići, with water ultimately from Skrad, with a capacity of 300 cubic metres (11,000 ft^{3}), is responsible for Moravice, Gornji Vučkovići, Gornji Vukšići, Donji Vukšići and Carevići.
