= Vasilije Matić =

Yugoslav forestry expert (1906–1981)

Vasilije Matić (12 June 1906 – 20 August 1981) was a forestry expert from Yugoslavia.

Matić was born in Srpske Moravice. He graduated from the Faculty of Agroforestry at the University of Zagreb in 1930. He worked at Sušak, Sarajevo and Tuzla forestry office (1932–38), and Jasenak forestry office (1939–41). During the occupation of World War II, he was imprisoned (1941–45). From 1945 to 1949, he worked in the Ministry of Forests, and the Ministry of Wood Processing Industry of the People's Republic of Bosnia and Herzegovina. He then became an Associate Professor and, in 1960, a full Professor on the Forestry faculty in Sarajevo in the subject of planning in forestry. He was an expert and science worker in forestry planning, particularly in the field of study of growth of trees. He was an organiser of the first forest inventory on large areas in Yugoslavia for the PR Bosnia and Herzegovina.
