= Stari Lazi =

Settlement in Primorje-Gorski Kotar County, Croatia

- Settlement
- Interactive map of Stari Lazi
- Location of Stari Lazi in Croatia
- Coordinates: 45°26′09″N 14°58′02″E
- Country: Croatia
- County: Primorje-Gorski Kotar
- Municipality: Brod Moravice

Area
  - Total: 2.5 km^{2} (0.97 sq mi)

Population (2021)
  - Total: 15
  - Density: 6.0/km^{2} (16/sq mi)
- Time zone: UTC+1 (CET)
  - Summer (DST): UTC+2 (CEST)
- Postal code: 51326 Vrbovsko

Stari Lazi is a settlement in the Municipality of Brod Moravice in Croatia. In 2021, its population was 15.

== History ==
When the Vlachs of Gomirje requested a confirmation of their Uskok rights throughout the territory they inhabited in 1605, they listed its boundaries as stretching from Mali Klek – Ustanke (the confluence of the Vitunjčica and the Dobra) – Vrbica – Kamensko – Vrbovsko – Plešivica – Mošenski – Bilek – "Potschovodo" – Topolovica – Okrugljik – Radigojna – Gornji Lazi.

== Demographics ==
Stari Lazi: Population trends 1857–2021
v

population	101	95	105	109	119	131	113	114	78	87	91	94	69	44	35	27	15
	1857	1869	1880	1890	1900	1910	1921	1931	1948	1953	1961	1971	1981	1991	2001	2011	2021

Sources: Croatian Bureau of Statistics publications
