= Komlenići =

Komlenići Комленићи (Serbian)
- Village
- Interactive map of Komlenići
- Location within Croatia
- Coordinates: 45.399655°N 15.035548°E
- Country: Croatia
- County: Primorje-Gorski Kotar County
- City: Vrbovsko
- Community: Moravice

Area
  - Total: 1.1 km^{2} (0.42 sq mi)

Population (2021)
  - Total: 4
  - Density: 3.6/km^{2} (9.4/sq mi)
- Time zone: UTC+1 (CET)
  - Summer (DST): UTC+2 (CEST)
- Postal code: 51326
- Area code: +385 051

Komlenići is a village in Croatia, under the Vrbovsko township, in Primorje-Gorski Kotar County.

== History ==
On 8 January 2012, it was the epicentre of a magnitude 2.4 earthquake.

Komlenići was hit by the 2014 Dinaric ice storm.

== Demographics ==
As of 2021, there were no inhabitants under the age of 45.

In 1870, Carevići had 8 houses and 72 people.

In 1890, Komlenići had 10 houses and 64 people. They attended the school in Dokmanovići. Administered and taxed by Komorske Moravice.

Village of Komlenići: Population trends 1857–2021
v

population	60	72	79	64	59	60	64	61	41	38	25	29	23	17	11	11	4
	1857	1869	1880	1890	1900	1910	1921	1931	1948	1953	1961	1971	1981	1991	2001	2011	2021

Sources: Croatian Bureau of Statistics publications

=== Further reading ===
- Kraljevski zemaljski statistički ured (1903). Političko i sudbeno razdieljenje i Repertorij prebivališta Kraljevina Hrvatske i Slavonije po stanju od 1. travnja 1903. Zagreb: Kraljevska hrvatsko-slavonsko-dalmatinska zemaljska vlada, 🖶 Kraljevska zemaljska tiskara.
- Kraljevski zemaljski statistički ured (May 1913). "Repertorij prebivališta po županijama, upravnim kotarima, gradovima, upravnim i poreznim općinama". Političko i sudbeno razdjeljenje i Repertorij prebivališta Kraljevina Hrvatske i Slavonije po stanju od 1. siječnja 1913. Zagreb: Kraljevska hrvatsko-slavonsko-dalmatinska zemaljska vlada, 🖶 Kraljevska zemaljska tiskara. pp. 1–126. Page 32.

== Politics ==
As of its foundation on 3 March 2008, it belongs to the local committee of Moravice.

== Infrastructure ==
The water storage unit in Radoševići, with a capacity of 40 cubic metres (1,400 ft^{3}), also is responsible for part of Moravice and for Tići, Komlenići and Poljana.

== Bibliography ==
- Korenčić, Mirko (1979). Naselja i stanovništvo Socijalističke Republike Hrvatske (1857–1971) [Villages and Population of the Socialist Republic of Croatia (1857–1971)]. Djela Jugoslavenske akademije znanosti i umjetnosti (in Serbo-Croatian). Vol. 54.
