= Jurga =

Jurga may refer to:

== First name ==
- Jurga Ivanauskaitė (1961–2007), Lithuanian writer
- Jurga Zilinskiene (born 1976), Lithuanian entrepreneur
- Jurga Šeduikytė (born 1980), Lithuanian singer and songwriter

== Last name ==
- Ursula Jurga, German rower

== Settlements ==
- Jurga, Croatia
