= Tomići =

Tomići Томићи (Serbian) Tomić Draga
- Village
- Interactive map of Tomići
- Location within Croatia
- Coordinates: 45.443693°N 15.002675°E
- Country: Croatia
- County: Primorje-Gorski Kotar County
- City: Vrbovsko
- Community: Moravice

Area
  - Total: 1.2 km^{2} (0.46 sq mi)
- Elevation: 567 m (1,860 ft)

Population (2021)
  - Total: 12
  - Density: 10/km^{2} (26/sq mi)
- Time zone: UTC+1 (CET)
  - Summer (DST): UTC+2 (CEST)
- Postal code: 51326
- Area code: +385 051

Tomići is a village in Croatia, under the Vrbovsko township, in Primorje-Gorski Kotar County. The Lujzijana road passes through it.

== History ==
In 1860–1879, Matija Mažuranić wrote a 62 folio manuscript today titled Writings on the Building of Roads in Gorski Kotar and Lika (Croatian: Spisi o gradnji cesta u Gorskom Kotaru i Lici), today with signature HR-ZaNSK R 6424. A 21 folio manuscript dated 1872 titled Darstellung der Entstehung des Baues ... der Luisenstrasse togethr with a translation by I. Mikloušić is kept as HR-ZaNSK R 4572.

In 1864, a rinderpest outbreak in Bosanci and Kasuni caused the Lujzijana to be closed to horned traffic for 21 days in December.

=== World War II ===
On 13 April 1941, Ante Pavelić arrived in Tomići on his way to Zagreb. It was Julian Palm Sunday that day, so most of the 83 residents of Tomići were dressed up and at home. Pavelić's Ustaše besieged the village and arrested about fifteen men who out of curiosity came out to observe the new army. The Ustaše then entered the house of Tone Marinić and, seeing he had a long moustache, accused him of being a Chetnik. Marinić replied he was a Croat, upon hearing which the Ustaše pressed him for information about Chetniks in the village. Marinić replied there were none, and since upon searching all the houses in the village they found no arms, the Ustaše lined up the villagers and forced them to shout, "Long live Ante Pavelić!" (Croatian: Živio Ante Pavelić!) when Pavelić drove through.

On 3 August, the Ustaše arrested 85 (or 63) Serb railway workers in Srpske Moravice. These were transferred to Ogulin, then Koprivnica, then Gospić then Jadovno where they were killed. On the night of the 2nd, Dušan Rajnović of Tomići had been on duty together with Lazo Jakšić. After midnight, a man approached them and warned them that the Ustaše had arrived at the station and were arresting night shift workers. A freight train had arrived around 23:00 carrying 8 Ustaše, awaited by a group of Ustaše from Moravice with lists of those who would be arrested. The two hid atop the tin-covered locomotive of series 32. Cvitešić arrived with an armed Ustaša, approached by Ivan Brajdić who asked, "Where are the locomotive watchers?" Brajdić answered he didn't know. Lazo, afraid, surrendered himself, and they bound him immediately. Dušan Rajnović fled home and at dawn left for Radigojna, warning Simik Juzbašić and Simo Rajnović-Mićičin not to come to work, but only Juzbašić heeded the warning. Rajnović-Mićičin never returned.

=== Recent ===
Tomići was hit by the 2014 Dinaric ice storm.

On 12 December 2017, a severe wind hit Tomići, blocking traffic to and from it.

== Demographics ==
As of 2021, there were only 2 inhabitants under the age of 20.

In 1870, Tomići had 12 houses and 104 people.

In 1890, Tomići had 12 houses and 97 people. They attended the school in Dokmanovići. Administered and taxed by Komorske Moravice.

Village of Tomići: Population trends 1857–2021
v

population	73	104	99	97	76	70	80	93	65	48	50	34	20	18	18	13	12
	1857	1869	1880	1890	1900	1910	1921	1931	1948	1953	1961	1971	1981	1991	2001	2011	2021

Note:"Tomić Draga" in 1857 and 1880. Sources: Croatian Bureau of Statistics publications

=== Further reading ===
- Kraljevski zemaljski statistički ured (1903). Političko i sudbeno razdieljenje i Repertorij prebivališta Kraljevina Hrvatske i Slavonije po stanju od 1. travnja 1903. Zagreb: Kraljevska hrvatsko-slavonsko-dalmatinska zemaljska vlada, 🖶 Kraljevska zemaljska tiskara.
- Kraljevski zemaljski statistički ured (May 1913). "Repertorij prebivališta po županijama, upravnim kotarima, gradovima, upravnim i poreznim općinama". Političko i sudbeno razdjeljenje i Repertorij prebivališta Kraljevina Hrvatske i Slavonije po stanju od 1. siječnja 1913. Zagreb: Kraljevska hrvatsko-slavonsko-dalmatinska zemaljska vlada, 🖶 Kraljevska zemaljska tiskara. pp. 1–126. Page 32.

== Politics ==
As of its foundation on 3 March 2008, it belongs to the local committee of Moravice.

== Infrastructure ==
The water storage unit in Dokmanovići, with a capacity of 100 cubic metres (3,500 ft^{3}), is also responsible for Radigojna, Tomići, Mišljenovići, Nikšići, Vukelići and Vučinići.

== Bibliography ==
- Korenčić, Mirko (1979). Naselja i stanovništvo Socijalističke Republike Hrvatske (1857–1971) [Villages and Population of the Socialist Republic of Croatia (1857–1971)]. Djela Jugoslavenske akademije znanosti i umjetnosti (in Serbo-Croatian). Vol. 54.
