= Radigojna =

Radigojna Радигојна (Serbian)
- Village
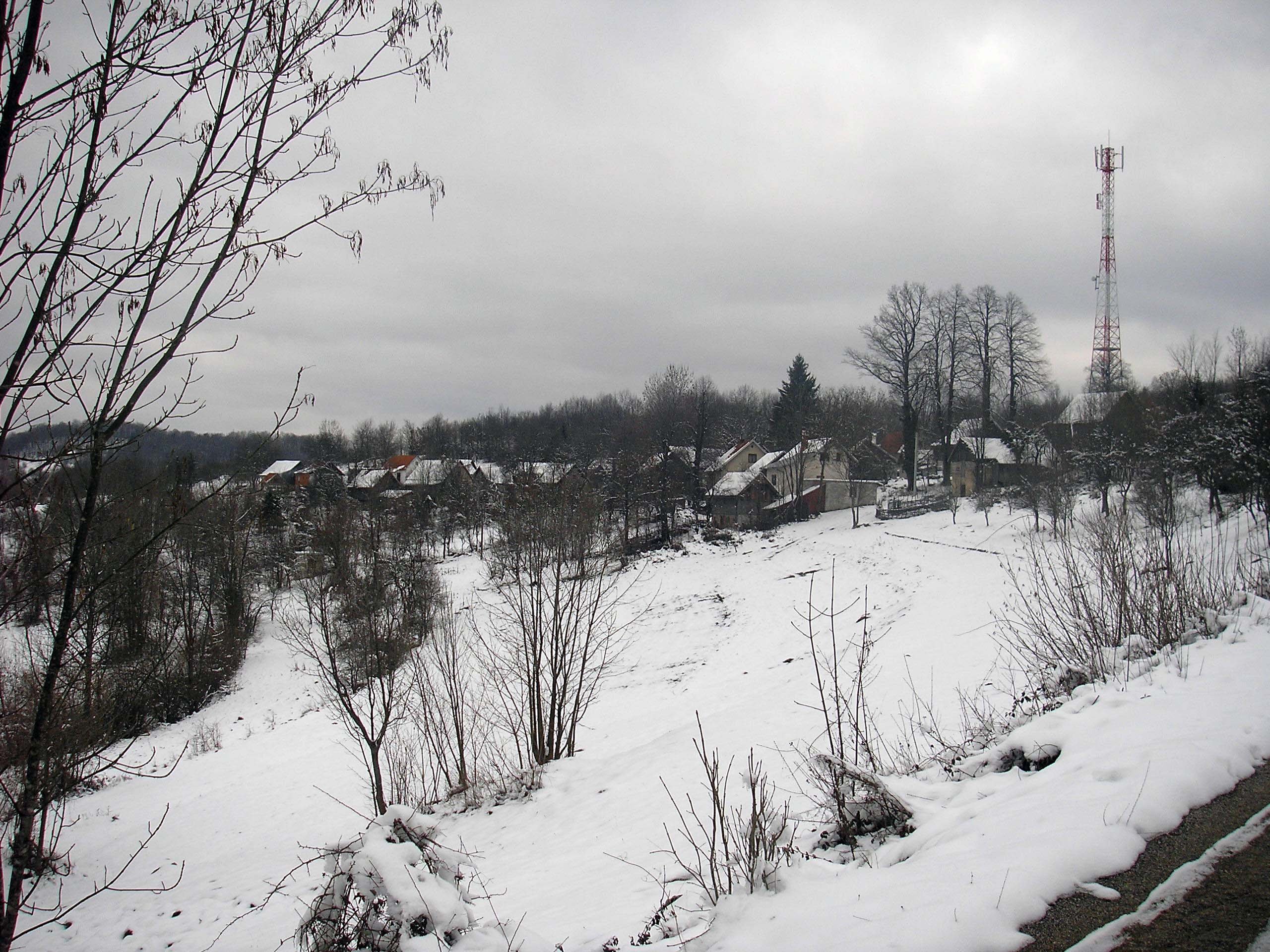
- Interactive map of Radigojna
- Location within Croatia
- Coordinates: 45.4499°N 15.0016°E
- Country: Croatia
- County: Primorje-Gorski Kotar County
- City: Vrbovsko
- Community: Moravice

Area
  - Total: 2.8 km^{2} (1.1 sq mi)
- Elevation: 645 m (2,116 ft)

Population (2021)
  - Total: 11
  - Density: 3.9/km^{2} (10/sq mi)
- Time zone: UTC+1 (CET)
  - Summer (DST): UTC+2 (CEST)
- Postal code: 51326
- Area code: +385 051

Radigojna is a village in Croatia, under the Vrbovsko township, in Primorje-Gorski Kotar County.

== History ==
When the Vlachs of Gomirje requested a confirmation of their Uskok rights throughout the territory they inhabited in 1605, they listed its boundaries as stretching from Mali Klek – Ustanke (the confluence of the Vitunjčica and the Dobra) – Vrbica – Kamensko – Vrbovsko – Plešivica – Mošenski – Bilek – "Potschovodo" – Topolovica – Okrugljik – Radigojna – Gornji Lazi.

=== WWII ===
On 3 August, the Ustaše arrested 85 (or 63) Serb railway workers in Srpske Moravice. These were transferred to Ogulin, then Koprivnica, then Gospić then Jadovno where they were killed. On the night of the 2nd, Dušan Rajnović of Tomići had been on duty together with Lazo Jakšić. After midnight, a man approached them and warned them that the Ustaše had arrived at the station and were arresting night shift workers. A freight train had arrived around 23:00 carrying 8 Ustaše, awaited by a group of Ustaše from Moravice with lists of those who would be arrested. The two hid atop the tin-covered locomotive of series 32. Cvitešić arrived with an armed Ustaša, approached by Ivan Brajdić who asked, "Where are the locomotive watchers?" Brajdić answered he didn't know. Lazo, afraid, surrendered himself, and they bound him immediately. Dušan Rajnović fled home and at dawn left for Radigojna, warning Simik Juzbašić and Simo Rajnović-Mićičin not to come to work, but only Juzbašić heeded the warning. Rajnović-Mićičin never returned.

=== Recent ===
Radigojna was hit by the 2014 Dinaric ice storm.

In 2023, the road entering Radigojna was asphalted.

== Demographics ==
As of 2021, there were no inhabitants under the age of 25.

In 1870, Carevići had 14 houses and 112 people.

In 1890, Radigojna had 17 houses and 136 people. They attended the school in Dokmanovići. Administered and taxed by Komorske Moravice.

Village of Radigojna: Population trends 1857–2021
v

population	103	112	129	136	128	129	127	121	101	89	65	54	55	47	38	23	11
	1857	1869	1880	1890	1900	1910	1921	1931	1948	1953	1961	1971	1981	1991	2001	2011	2021

Sources: Croatian Bureau of Statistics publications

=== Further reading ===
- Kraljevski zemaljski statistički ured (1903). Političko i sudbeno razdieljenje i Repertorij prebivališta Kraljevina Hrvatske i Slavonije po stanju od 1. travnja 1903. Zagreb: Kraljevska hrvatsko-slavonsko-dalmatinska zemaljska vlada, 🖶 Kraljevska zemaljska tiskara.
- Kraljevski zemaljski statistički ured (May 1913). "Repertorij prebivališta po županijama, upravnim kotarima, gradovima, upravnim i poreznim općinama". Političko i sudbeno razdjeljenje i Repertorij prebivališta Kraljevina Hrvatske i Slavonije po stanju od 1. siječnja 1913. Zagreb: Kraljevska hrvatsko-slavonsko-dalmatinska zemaljska vlada, 🖶 Kraljevska zemaljska tiskara. pp. 1–126. Page 32.

== Politics ==
As of its foundation on 3 March 2008, it belongs to the local committee of Moravice.

== Infrastructure ==
The water storage unit in Dokmanovići, with a capacity of 100 cubic metres (3,500 ft^{3}), is also responsible for Radigojna, Tomići, Mišljenovići, Nikšići, Vukelići and Vučinići.

== Gallery ==
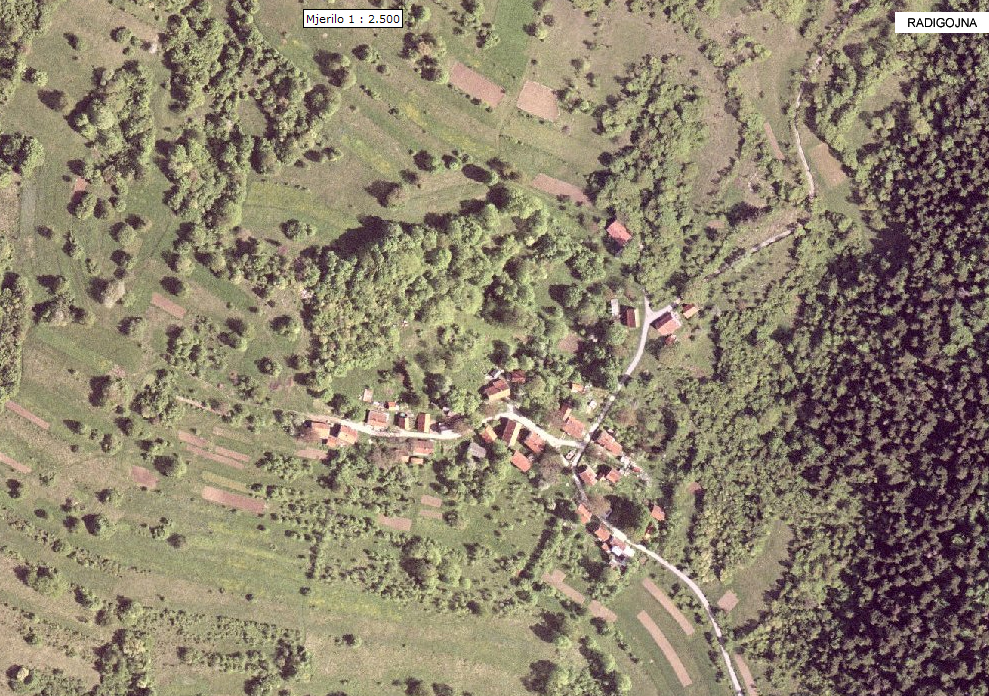
Aerial view.

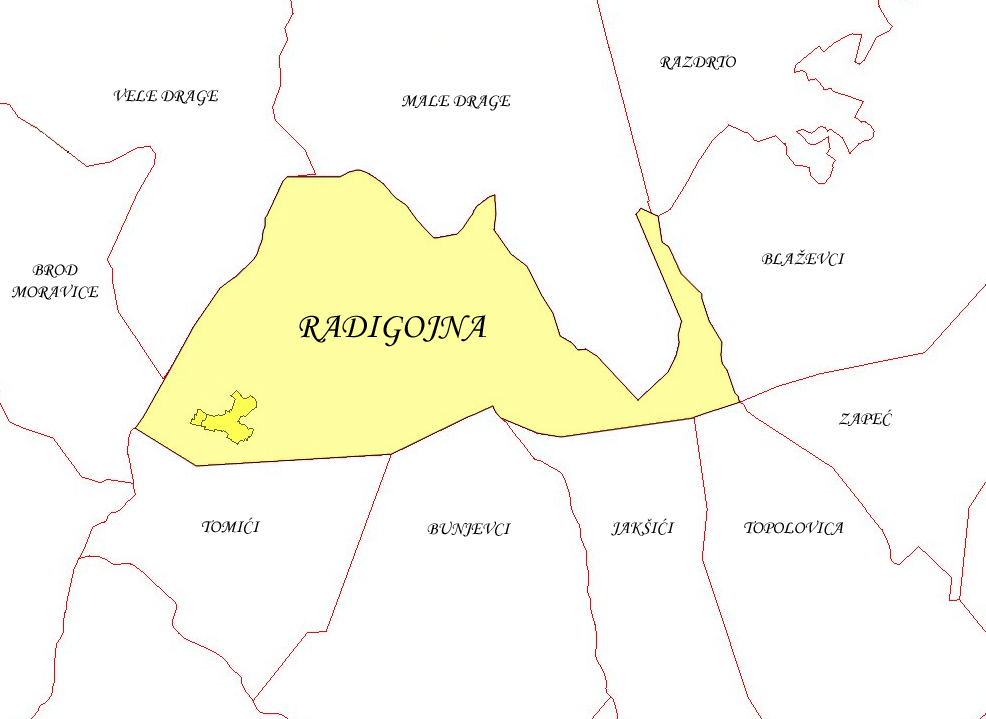
Naselje boundaries.

== Bibliography ==
- Korenčić, Mirko (1979). Naselja i stanovništvo Socijalističke Republike Hrvatske (1857–1971) [Villages and Population of the Socialist Republic of Croatia (1857–1971)]. Djela Jugoslavenske akademije znanosti i umjetnosti (in Serbo-Croatian). Vol. 54.
