= Ljeskovac =

Coordinates: 44°42′36″N 19°13′12″E

'Leskova vесковац
Location	Bijeljina, Republika Srpska
Population – (est.) – (1991 census)
Area code	+387 55
Time zone	CET (UTC +1); CEST (UTC +2)
Website	www.opstinabijeljina.com

Ljeskovac (Serbian Cyrillic: Љесковац) is a place located south of the city of Bijeljina in Republika Srpska, Bosnia and Herzegovina.
