= Dobra (Kupa) =

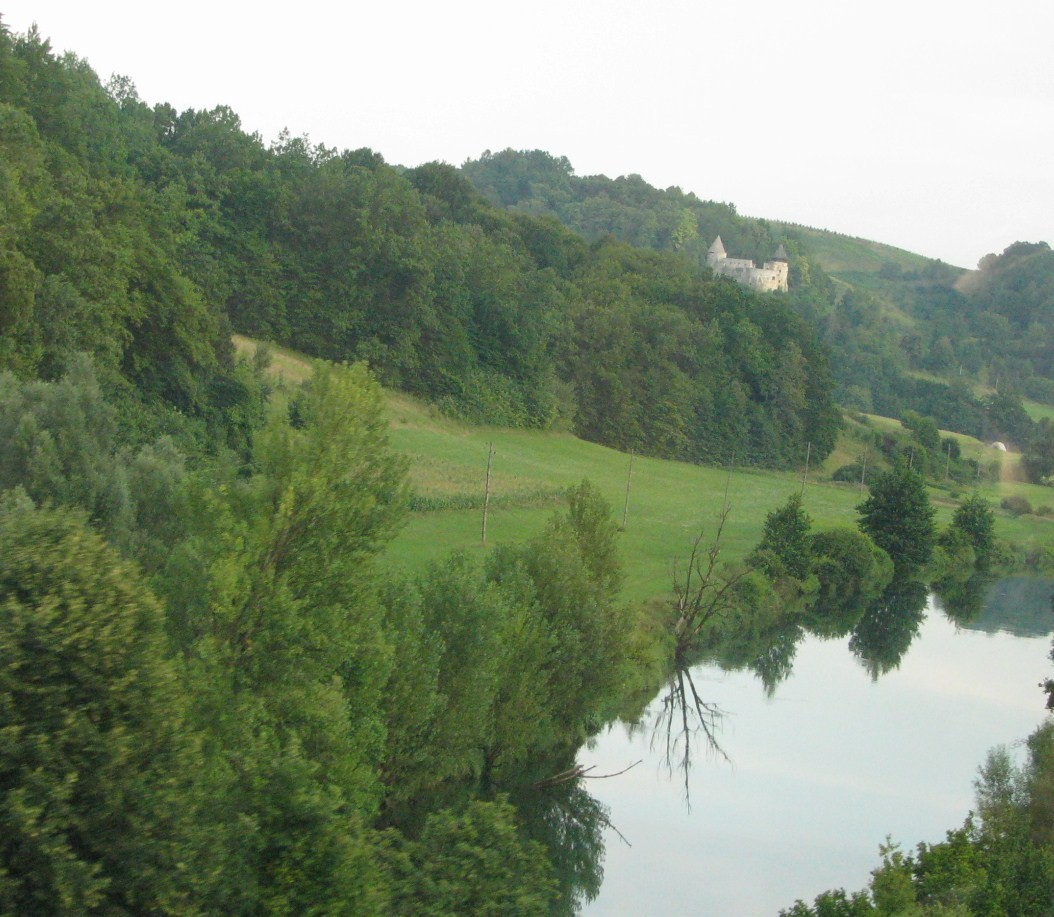

Location
- Country: Croatia

Physical characteristics
- Mouth
  - location: Kupa
  - coordinates: 45°32′58″N 15°31′25″E
- Length: 104.2 km (64.7 mi)
- Basin size: 1,428 km^{2} (551 sq mi)

Basin features
- Progression: Kupa→ Sava→ Danube→ Black Sea

The Dobra (pronounced [dobra]) is a river located mostly in the Karlovac County in the Republic of Croatia. It is 104.2 kilometres (64.7 mi) long and its basin covers an area of 1,428 square kilometres (551 sq mi). Its name is the feminine form of the Croatian adjective meaning "good" but it is over simplistic folk etymology. The river name probably comes from the Celtic transl. cel – transl. dubrum, dubron meaning 'water', Illyrian δυβρις (dybris) 'deep' or Old Slavonic dъbrь (dubri, debra) also 'deep' or 'valley'.

Dobra rises in Gorski Kotar near Skrad and Ravna Gora, where it flows first to the north and then turns to the east. It flows past Vrbovsko, to the southeast into the city of Ogulin, where it becomes an underground stream. It takes a sharp northward turn and rises back to the surface north of Ogulin. It continues to the northeast, past the Lešće spa and a hydroelectric plant (built and in test operation as of 2010), running in parallel to the Kupa and Mrežnica, and finally flows into the Kupa north of Karlovac.

The Dobra river is rich in fish and birds. The Upper and Lower Dobra river are abundant with fish species: brown and rainbow trout, grayling, chub, barbel, bleak, carp, and tench, all in Upper Dobra, while the Lower Dobra is one of the rare Croatian rivers that has fish species such as sprout, pike, chub, pomfret, and barbel.

North of Ogulin, near Gojak, the water of Dobra is harvested for the Gojak Hydroelectric Power Plant, a hydroelectric power plant built to utilize the rivers Dobra and Mrežnica. In 2010 the Lešće hydroelectric power plant started operating on the Lower Dobra section of the river.

Two motorway bridges have been built over the Dobra: the Dobra Bridge (A1) and the Dobra Bridge (A6).

== Upper Dobra or Ogulin Dobra ==
Upper Dobra (Croatian: Gornja Dobra) or Ogulin Dobra (Croatian: Ogulinska Dobra) is a typical torrential water with sudden and big changes in volume flow, while the average slope decline is 1.4%. A smaller river Kamačnik flows into Dobra near Vrbovsko. Until 1957 Dobra was disappearing in Đulin ponor, a ponor in the center of Ogulin. The Upper Dobra river was diverted into the system of the Hydroelectric power plant Gojak some 1.5 km upstream of Đula's pit, and by doing that an artificial lake Bukovnik was created. From the dam down to Đula's pit the river bed is filled with water that is there only once in a while, whenever there's heavy rainfall which causes the river to overflow the dam.

== Watershed ==
Tributaries of the Gornja Dobra include the Vitunjčica, Turković Potok, Zlatinac, Vušljivac, Brozovac, Kamačnik, and others.

Tributaries of the Donja Dobra include the Bistrica, the Ribnjak, Bosiljevski Potok (subterranean confluence), the Globornica (with tributary Sušica), Potok Mračinski (subterranean confluence), Potok Draganački (subterranean confluence), Jastrebica and others.

== History ==
When the Vlachs of Gomirje requested a confirmation of their Uskok rights throughout the territory they inhabited in 1605, they listed its boundaries as stretching from Mali Klek – Ustanke (the confluence of the Vitunjčica and the Dobra) – Vrbica – Kamensko – Vrbovsko – Plešivica – Mošenski – Bilek – "Potschovodo" – Topolovica – Okrugljik – Radigojna – Gornji Lazi.

=== Gallery ===
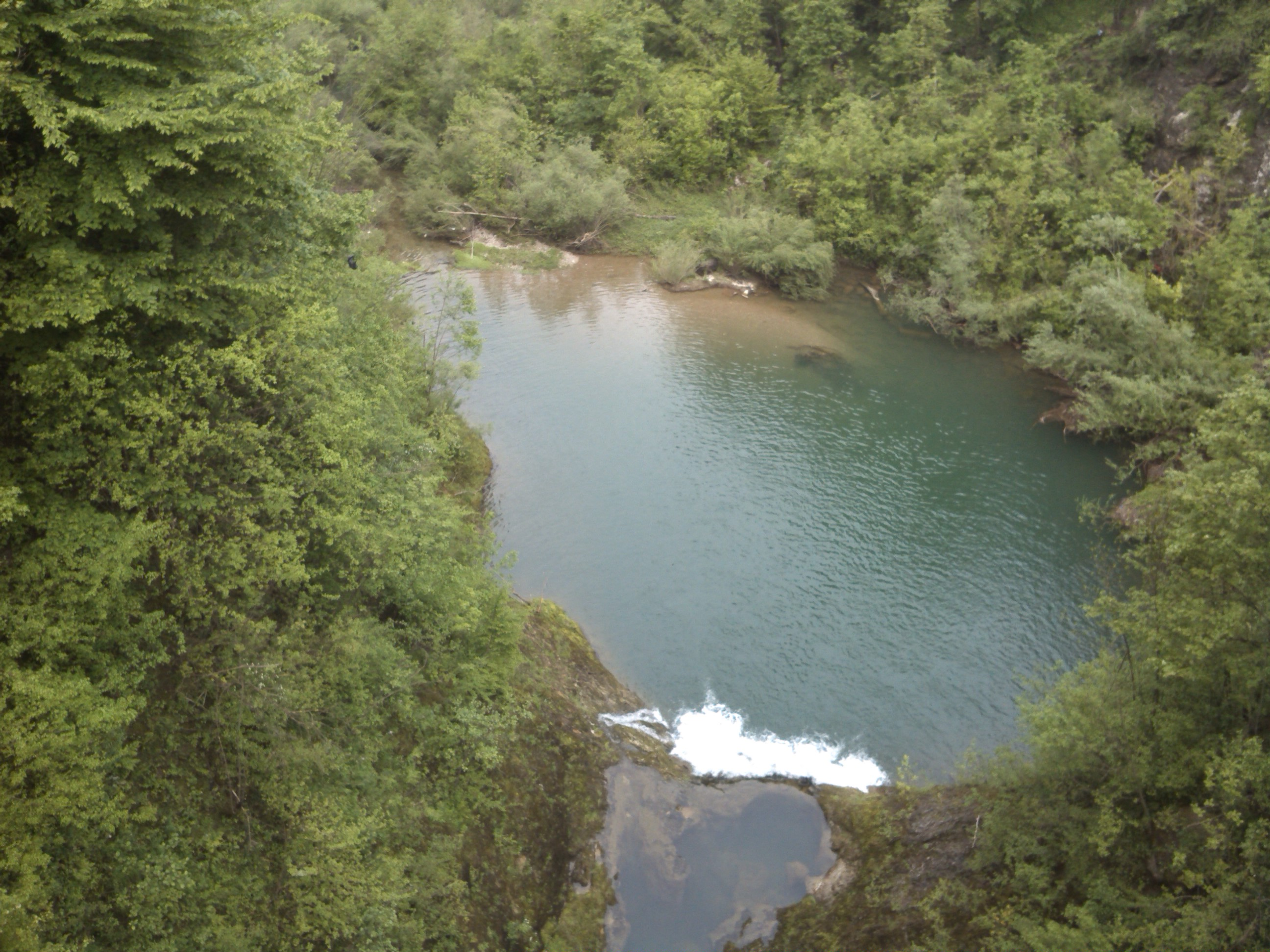
At Ogulin

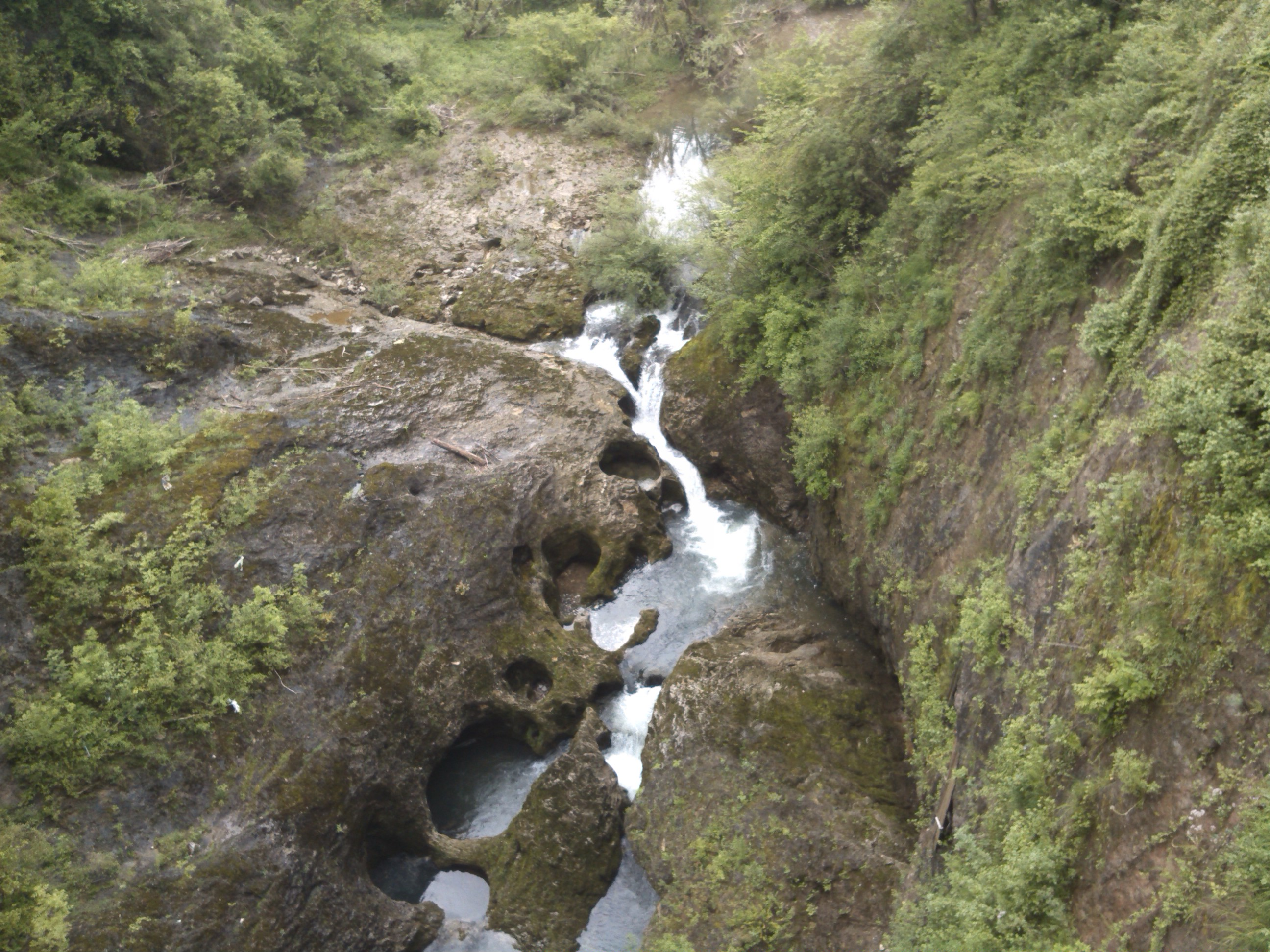
Just before Đulin ponor

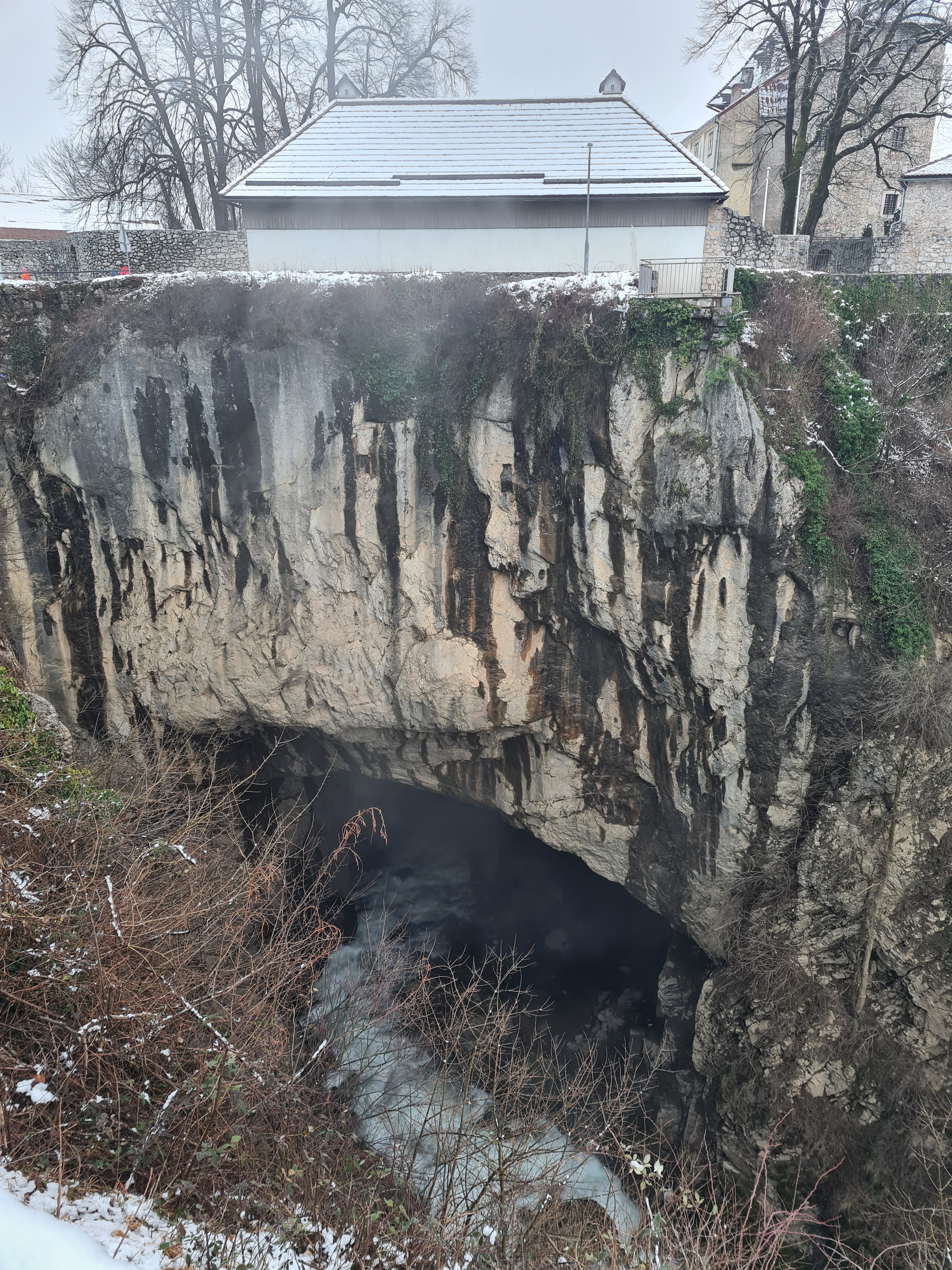
Đulin ponor
