= Matija Mažuranić =

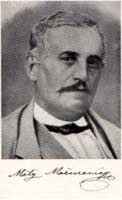
- Signed photograph of Matija Mažuranić
- Born: 1817; Novi Vinodolski, Austrian Empire
- Died: April 17, 1881 (aged 63–64); Feldhof, Austria
- Occupation: Writer
- Writing career
- Movement: Romanticism

Matija Mažuranić (1817–April 17, 1881) was a Croatian writer best known for his travelogues. He was the brother of more renowned Ivan, the writer of the well-known epic Smrt Smail-age Čengića.

He was born in Novi Vinodolski and attended a German school in his native town, where he was trained to become a blacksmith. He often indulged in travels visiting Montenegro, Serbia, and occasionally to Bosnia. In 1841, he returned to Novi, practising his craft and agriculture while engaging in literature and cultural issues. In 1847, he moved to Vienna, and in 1848, he was in Bosnia again (in Sarajevo, at the court of Fazli-paša Šerifija). At the end of 1848, in a letter to his brothers he wrote: "I don't know when I shall return home, for I have been, I'm afraid, created for this country. Turks are very fond of me for my prudence, they say, and rayah grows ever more trust in me, and therefrom there is no other outcome but mitre on the head or a stake in the arse". After Sarajevo, Matija went to Istanbul (though the exact dates are uncertain), and according to some legends, even further, to Suez and the Egypt. In 1852, Matija returned to Novi, where he settled until falling ill in 1879. He lived a secluded life until symptoms of mental degeneration appeared, and he eventually died in the sanatorium of renowned psychiatrist Richard von Krafft-Ebing, in Feldhof near Graz, on April 17, 1881.

As a writer, Mažuranić was noted for his travelogue Pogled u Bosnu. During his 1839 travels to Bosnia (from Karlovac, Sisak and Kostajnica, over Belgrade, on foot and horse, to Sarajevo, Travnik, over Romanija up to Zvornik), Mažuranić wrote a piece which can be read both as an adventure and as a realistic account of his experiences. The travelogue intermixes author's views on the relationships between the Ottoman Turks and the Bosniaks, Islam and Christianity, with accounts of the customs of everyday life, images of vizier courts of agas and pashas, but also of folk meyhanes, contemplations on everyday life, love and death.

== Works ==
- Pogled u Bosnu, ili kratak put u onu krajinu, učinjen 1839—40. po jednom domorodcu, Zagreb, 1842
- Izabrana djela, PSHK, b. 32, Zagreb, 1965
