= Dokmanovići =

Dokmanovići Докмановићи (Serbian)
- Village
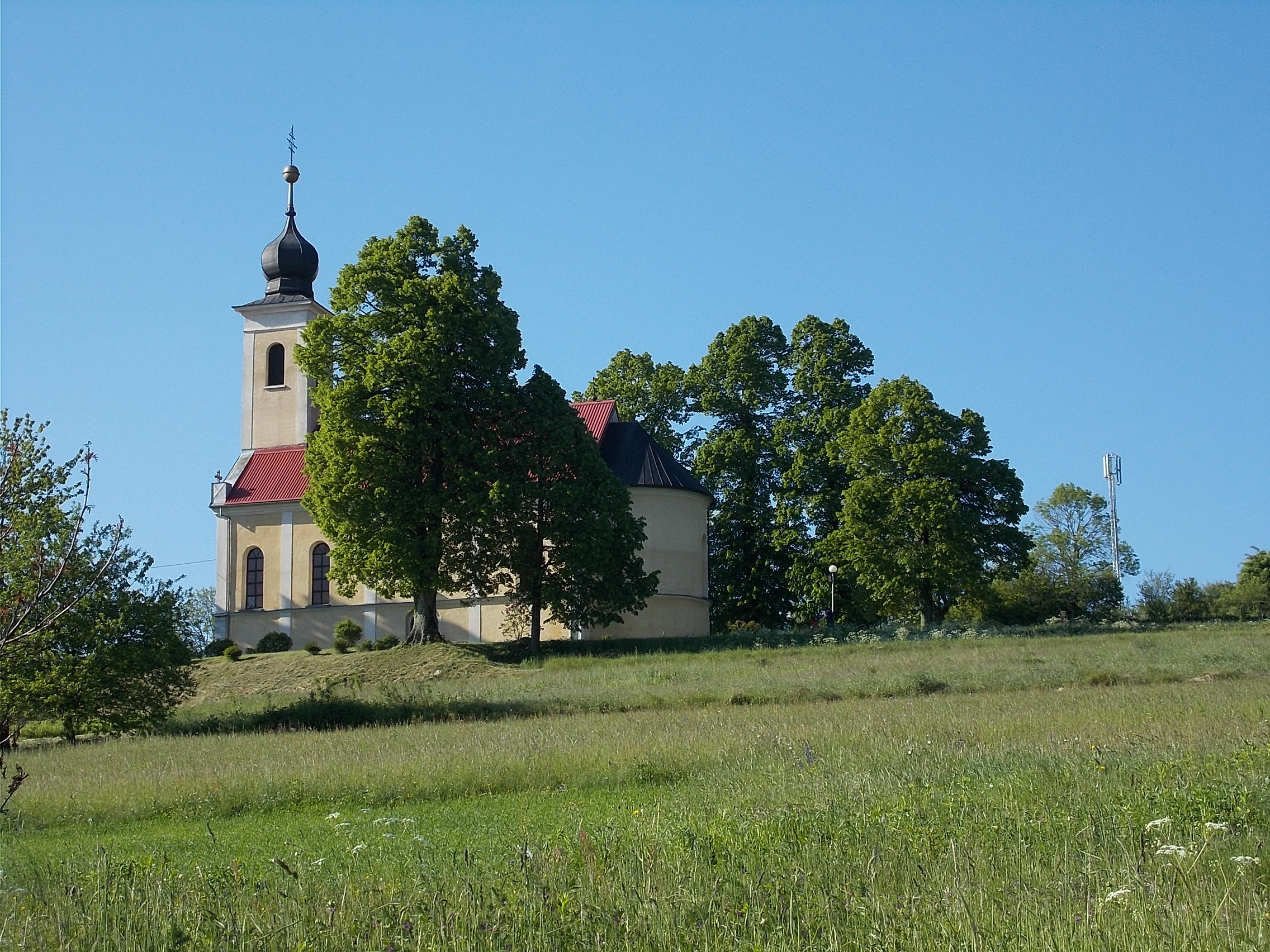
- Sv. Georgija church
- Interactive map of Dokmanovići
- Location within Croatia
- Coordinates: 45.422°N 15.029°E
- Country: Croatia
- County: Primorje-Gorski Kotar County
- City: Vrbovsko
- Community: Moravice

Area
  - Total: 0.3 km^{2} (0.12 sq mi)

Population (2021)
  - Total: 36
  - Density: 120/km^{2} (310/sq mi)
- Time zone: UTC+1 (CET)
  - Summer (DST): UTC+2 (CEST)
- Postal code: 51326
- Area code: +385 051

Dokmanovići is a village in Croatia, under the Vrbovsko township, in Primorje-Gorski Kotar County. The Lujzijana road passes by it.

== Name ==
Dokmanovići is also the name of a hamlet of Banski Moravci, a hamlet of Gornja Močila, and a a hamlet of Lapat.

== History ==
In 1860–1879, Matija Mažuranić wrote a 62 folio manuscript today titled Writings on the Building of Roads in Gorski Kotar and Lika (Croatian: Spisi o gradnji cesta u Gorskom Kotaru i Lici), today with signature HR-ZaNSK R 6424. A 21 folio manuscript dated 1872 titled Darstellung der Entstehung des Baues ... der Luisenstrasse togethr with a translation by I. Mikloušić is kept as HR-ZaNSK R 4572.

In 1864, a rinderpest outbreak in Bosanci and Kasuni caused the Lujzijana to be closed to horned traffic for 21 days in December.

An elementary school once functioned in Dokmanovići, now used for hosting events.

Dokmanovići was hit by the 2014 Dinaric ice storm.

On 12 December 2017, a severe wind hit Dokmanovići, blocking traffic to and from it.

A Gavranović chain convenience store opened in Dokmanovići, broken into and robbed in November 2014 shortly after the robbery of the restaurant in Kamačnik, together with the Gavranović store in Severin na Kupi.

== Demographics ==
As of 2021, there were only 3 inhabitants under the age of 20.

In 1890, Dokmanovići had 11 houses and 104 people. They attended the school in Dokmanovići. Administered and taxed by Komorske Moravice.

Village of Dokmanovići: Population trends 1857–2021
v

population			97	104	79	70	86	94	53	90	94	107	107	118	61	54	36
	1857	1869	1880	1890	1900	1910	1921	1931	1948	1953	1961	1971	1981	1991	2001	2011	2021

Note:Under Moravice in 1857 and 1869. In 2001, part of its territory was transferred to Moravice. Sources: Croatian Bureau of Statistics publications

== Politics ==
As of its foundation on 3 March 2008, it belongs to the local committee of Moravice.

== Infrastructure ==
The water storage unit in Dokmanovići, with a capacity of 100 cubic metres (3,500 ft^{3}), is also responsible for Radigojna, Tomići, Mišljenovići, Nikšići, Vukelići and Vučinići.
