= Gomirje =

Gomirje Gojmerje, Gomerje
- Village
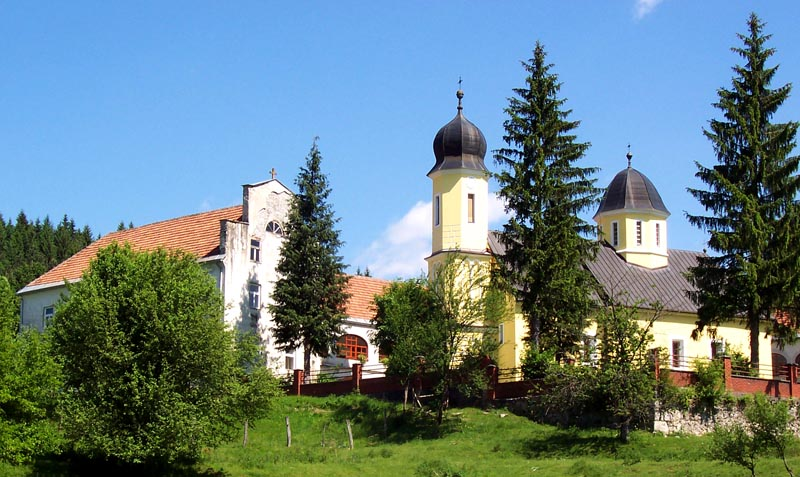
- Interactive map of Gomirje
- Location of Gomirje in Croatia
- Coordinates: 45°20′10″N 15°07′01″E
- Country: Croatia
- County: Primorje-Gorski Kotar
- Municipality: Vrbovsko

Area
  - Total: 6.7 km^{2} (2.6 sq mi)
- Elevation: 418 m (1,371 ft)

Population (2021)
  - Total: 255
  - Density: 38/km^{2} (99/sq mi)
- Time zone: UTC+1 (CET)
  - Summer (DST): UTC+2 (CEST)

Gomirje is a settlement in north-western Croatia, situated at the far east of the mountainous region of Gorski kotar in the Primorje-Gorski Kotar County. It is part of the Vrbovsko municipality. The population is 343 (as of the 2011 census).

== Name ==
It was recorded as Goimeria on the 1673 map of Stjepan Glavač.

== History ==
=== Pre-Turkish ===
The remains of an old fortification exist on the Stražnik hill.

From the Modruše urbarium of 1486 it is known that most of the villagers of Gomirje paid 1 ducat to Lord Bernardin Frankopan annually, in addition to 1 heifer, 3 časti on Michaelmas, colored sheep, hay, and other services written in the now-lost book of obligations (Serbo-Croatian: ⰽⰾⰰⰴⰵⱃⱀⰰ). Some also had corvée duties, including horse duty (Matko and Jandri Črnjak, Mihel Brnardić, (Note: Formerly 1 ducat.) Ivan Slavinčić), horse breeding (Martin Ptičić), bird duty (Martin Ptičar), transport (Mikula Brnardić, Vale Klenković, Mikula Mikčić, (Note: Formerly served in Modruše.) Petar Mikčić), and carpentry (Grgo Klenković, Petar Dragošić, Štefan Glubinić). Ivan Staničić had half horse duty, half carpentry duty. Fabian Branetić formerly had horse duty but by that time was allowed to merely do "what he could" (Serbo-Croatian: ⱍⰰ ⱞⱁⱃⰵ). Mihalj Luketić and Stipan Ratković had formerly paid 1 ducat but their duty had been relaxed to 2 old sheep. Each farm encompassed an average of 13.3 morgens of land, including pasture. The largest landowner was Jandri Ptičić, who served in Modruše or else paid 2 ducats, with 29 morgens. The poorest farmers were Mihel Lučetić with 3 morgens, owing a half ducat, and Lovre Slavečić with 5 morgens, owing 50 soldini. The glebe of priest Šimun was 22 morgens, including 1 meadow and 2 glades; his brother Broz shared with is brother-in-law Marko and Grge Borenić a single farm with 22 morgens. During the visitation, Jandri Pavlićević was discovered to be farming land he did not own, so it was confiscated in the name of Lord Frankopan. By that time, 33 farms remained, as 5 had been left uninhabited (Hrgolovo, Mikulino, Pavalče, Pogibelića, (Note: Formerly served transport corvée.) and the farm of Juraj Hropar).

The most common surnames were Brnardić (3), Malčić (3), Ptičić (3), Borenić (2?), Branetić (2), Črnjak (2), Dragošić (2), Mikčić (2), and Slavečić (2); Glubinić, Lučetić, Luketić, Matetić, Pavlićević, Slavinčić, Staničić, Šoštar, Tomšić, and Valčetić are each listed only once.

Two mills and 12 additional weirs existed at Gomirje at the time. One mill was owned by Lovre Valčetić. The other mill was owned 2/3 by Vale Klenković and 1/3 by Grgo Klenković. Mikula Mikčić owned a 6th of a weir; one weir whose ownership was effectively split into 3 (Tome Ptičić, Jure Tomšić, Jandri Matetić); Luketić, Ratković, Ivan Staničić, and Petar Branetić each owned half a weir; Martin and Jandri Ptičić owned half another weir; Mikula Brnardić owned his own weir and together with Mihel Brnardić had purchased Tisovac "po sinu njih", Mihel himself owning half a weir; Petar Dragošić and Fabian Branetić each owned their own weir; the owners of the Borenić farm owned 2 weirs; and Marin Krpetić owned 2 weirs alone.

=== Turkish wars ===
On 17 September 1602, the županijski sudac Bernardo Severšić issued from Bosiljevo a judgement on a case between the Frankapan family members Juraj, Nikola and Vuk on the one hand ant the Vlachs of Gomirje on the other.

A brick fortification was built in Gomirje itself by the Sečen (Note: "Secz") family for defence against the Turks. Documents relating to this were said to have been preserved in the castles of Bosiljevo and Severin.

=== Kingdom of Croatia-Slavonia ===
On 28 August 1883, the news came early in the morning that the villagers of Gomirje had gathered around the villa of the deceased wife of Baron Lazar Mamula with the intent of taking down the "Hungarian Crest" that had been nailed to the obćinski ured the day before. The Obćinski načelnik and notary had retreated to the aforementioned villa for fear of confrontation. About 100 villagers were found at the villa, their numbers continuously growing with the addition of people from surrounding villages. The Obćina notary asked them the reason for their meeting, to which they replied, "Honor to the Obćina office, the Obćinski Načelnik and to you, O notary — but the Hungarian crest must be taken down from the Obćina office, as was done with the crests on the stores of Wortmann and Dane Šakić." (Note: "Čast obćonskomu uredu, obć. načelniku i vam, bilježniče — ali magjarski grb mora s obćinskoga ureda dolje, kao što je to učinjeno sa grbovi na trafici Wortmanna i Dane Šakića.") This was a reference to a previous takedown of the joint Croatian-Hungarian crest from the store of Wortmann. The Obćina notary tried in vain to convince them it was not a Hungarian but a joint crest, but the villagers continued to cry, "we need no other kind of crest but the imperial eagle, which Šakić's store has over there, which was until now hidden and turned upside down"; (Note: "Mi netrebamo nikakova drugog grba osim carskog orla, kojeg eno tamo na trafici Šakićevoj, te koji je bio do sada sakriven okrenut glavom dolje.") the joint crest of Dane Šakić was merely turned rightside up and nailed in backwards position, so that only the Imperial Eagle painted on its backside showed. Since the notary could not convince them, the načelnik offered to go with the now almost 400 villagers to the Obćina office to show them that it was not a Hungarian crest, only to find that the crest had already been taken down. The crowd then resolved to find the crest themselves, beating innkeeper Laze Vučković with batons and throwing him in a ditch after taking down the crest from his inn. Some searched further as far as Hambarište, but it was never found. The Obćina office complained about the incident to the Okrug predstojnik Stipetić, who carried out an investigation, encountering four of the rioters bowling by the inn. One of them asked his peers rhetorically, "Tell the lord predstojnik, do you wish to be Hungarian or Imperial?" (Note: "Kažite pred g. predstojnikom hoćete li biti magjarski ili carski?") Out of fear, no one answered. The predstojnik called a meeting of the Obćina council at 14:00 on the 29th, mostly discussing the Hungarian issue. Mane Grbić of Karlovac, who had spent several days in Gomirje, gave a speech before the council and gathered villagers around him, convincing them with his rhetoric to desist from rioting, and peace was restored.

=== Kingdom of Yugoslavia ===
In 1933, Chetnik formations were organised on the territory of Srpske Moravice, Gomirje and Lička Jesenica. They had a minor political influence until 1941 when a large number of them were killed in the first wave of liquidations.

=== WWII ===
==== 1941 ====
In May 1941, the Ustaša government began targeting known and suspected JRZ members with arrests. The prominent JRZ members in Gomirje at the time were Vlado Mrvoš, Petar Musulin, Bogdan Mamula and Miloš Trbović.

In late May, the Ustaše arrested a number of villagers from Gomirje were and imprisoned them in the Ogulin castle, transferred on 6 June to the Danica concentration camp, and finally the Jadovno concentration camp.

A 2 July was issued order for all Velike župe, including that of Modruš (with seat in Ogulin), to make room for 2500 Slovenes each, who were to occupy the homes of 2500 Serbs, to be deported to the GMS, prioritising businessmen and merchants. Gomirje was to accommodate 250 Slovenes. As of mid-July, there were not enough empty Serb homes to accommodate the exchange. The kotarski načelnik complained that Gomirje had been confiscatd by the state and that the monastery was going to be used as a livestock station, emphasising the need to "first deport all Serbs, and then import the Slovenes" (Croatian: prvo iseliti sve Srbe, a potom naseliti Slovence).

It has been claimed that the plunder of the monastery was done on the order of Ogulin priest Ivan Mikan, On 9 June 1941, according to the memory of the sole surviving Gomirje monk, father Nektarije Dazgić, the Ustaše arrived by surprise from Ogulin in a truck, besieged the monastery, drove the monks into their cells and questioned them about money and the keys to the monastery coffers. After beating them, they transported them to Ogulin. Any remaining monks of Gomirje were arrested in late June and early July. In early July, the hegumen and four monks had not yet been sent away. As of a 15 July document, all Orthodox priests from Gomirje had been sent to concentration camps. At Danica, Dazgić recalled seeing almost the entire ecclesiastical court of Plaški, and a total of more than 30 priests.

In the context of deportations of families to the GMS through Sisak concentration camp during the planned Slovene-Serb ethnic exchange, the općinsko poglavarstvo of Gomirje wrote that all men of Gomirje from age 16 up had fled into the forests in fear of the Ustaše, so that the općina did not know which houses had been emptied and which were only temporarily empty.

On 30 July, many Serbs from Ogulin and the surrounding villages were arrested at the market in Ogulin. The second uncle of Milka Bunjevac, a Vučinić with a prominent job at the railway station, was to be arrested that day, but he was warned by an Ustaša that he should flee "wherever he knows" (Croatian: kamo god zna) because that night he would be arrested. Vučinić then boarded a train from Ogulin to Gomirje, arriving at his sister's house around midnight and then fleeing to the GMS two or three days later.

==== 1942 ====
At 10:00 on 24 February 1942, a group of about 300 "Communists" with automatic weapons arrived in the area of Ogulin and above Hreljin and Kučaj. Until 14:00, they blocked the road to Ogulin, after which they retreated to Gomirje. For 3–4 days they appeared from time to time in the area of Ogulin, Hreljin, Vrbovsko and Gomirje, then Gornje Dubrave, Gomirje and Jasenak.

On 8 May, an Italian military patrol was attacked along the railway between Gomirje and Ogulin by Serbian rebels. 5 Italian soldiers were killed, 1 was heavily wounded, 2 were disarmed and 2 were taken captive.

On the 27th, 47 Serbian rebels surrendered their Royal Yugoslav Army weapons in Ogulin, whom the Italian army then rearmed and created a Chetnik division in Gomirje, tasking them with carrying out various security related tasks. The Veliki Župan sought from the Italian authorities permission to create similar formations among Croats, but was forbidden from doing so.

On 11 June, the Italians armed 51 Serbs who had returned to their homes under Italian protection with guns from Modruš County

On 1 July, the Chetniks of Gomirje and Musulini accompanied the Italian army on an anti-Partisan campaign in Musulinski Potok. 2 Chetniks were wounded and a number of Partisans were killed and wounded. The Chetniks captured a machine gun and 20 military rifles. Then on the 6th, the Partisans carried out an attack on Gomirje and Musulini, which the Chetniks repelled. On the 9th, Partisans attacked the railway station in Gomirje, but the Italian soldiers stationed there drove off the attack. 3 Italian soldiers were wounded.

==== 1945 ====
In 1945, Gomirje native lieutenant Mihajlo Barbulović, (Note: b. 26 September 1910 to Ljubomir Barbulović and his wife Marija.) commander of the SDS in Kamenica and later Chief of Staff of the Mountain Guard of the JVuO, went missing in Bosnia. Barbulović was married to Bosiljka née Bosanac, who was to be interrogated by the Gestapo and, on the order of Svetozar Nećak, held as a hostage. But she had already escaped to safety. A file on Barbulović is kept at the Historical Archive of Belgrade, and a letter of his to Valjevo okružni načelnik Dragomir Lukić from the "free Serbian mountains" (Serbian: слободних српских планина) survives.

=== Federal ===
The volunteer fire department DVD Gomirje was founded on 29 January 1982, and is today part of the VZ grada Vrbovsko. Its current commander is Mihajlo Kosanović.

=== Recent ===
Gomirje was hit by the 2014 Dinaric ice storm. From 31 January to 2 February 2014, while S and SW geostrophic wind dominated, freezing rain fell on Gorski Kotar, glazing the entire region. It wrecked roofs, power lines an forests, causing power loss for about 14,000 households in Gorski Kotar, or about 80% of its population. It took about 10 days to restore essential infrastructure to the region, and within months electricity was back in most of its former range, but at a cost of about 84.4 million HRK to HEP. At the time it was the largest peacetime damage since its Secession from Yugoslavia, even without counting the forestry losses. The Šumarija Gomirje fared well relative to western forestry branches, losing mainly diseased and very poorly anchored trees. Clearing blocked forestry roads and forest paths would take years, and thanks to the declining population some were never cleared.

More recently, several larger fires impacted the economy of Gomirje. On 19 December 2020 at 18:54 the ŽVOC Rijeka received a call about a structure fire in the former DIP sawmill on Jove Stojanovića Brice 23 where 110 round bales had caught on fire. It was put out at 4:40 on the 20th by DVD Gomirje, DVD "Željezničar" Moravice, DVD Vrbovsko and JVP Ogulin. On 22 March 2024 at 1:49 the ŽVOC Rijeka received a call about a fire inside the local pellet plant, encompassing 1,200 square metres (13,000 ft^{2}). It was localised at 3:10 by DVD Gomirje, DVD Vrbovsko, DVD "Željezničar" Moravice, DVD Lukovdol and JVP Ogulin. Later, it was determined to have been caused by an improperly installed electrical component. The fire resulted in severe material damage to the plant, including loss of the pellet machine.

== Demographics ==
As of 2021, there were only 31 inhabitants under the age of 20.

Historical population 1857-2011
v

| population | 1180 | 1505 | 905 | 599 | 549 | 523 | 506 | 610 | 369 | 387 | 381 | 430 | 466 | 478 | 435 | 343 |
| | 1857 | 1869 | 1880 | 1890 | 1900 | 1910 | 1921 | 1931 | 1948 | 1953 | 1961 | 1971 | 1981 | 1991 | 2001 | 2011 |

Note:Includes Ljubošina and Musulini in 1857 and 1869 and partly in 1880. Considered a dio naselja from 1890. From 1910 to 1931, part of the population was counted under Ponikve, općina Ogulin. In 2001, Kamensko and Majer were separated. From 1857 to 1880 and in 1981 and 1991 it includes the population of Majer. Sources: Croatian Bureau of Statistics publications

In 1835, Gomirje belonged to Ogulin. There were 92 houses, with a population of 1017. Its residents were mostly Orthodox, but 29 were Catholic.

Religion in Vrbovsko Municipality (1890 census)
| Religion | Percentage |
| Eastern Orthodox | 91.8% |
| Catholics | 8.0% |
| Protestants | 1.1% |
| Jews | 0.2% |

In 1890, the obćina of Gomirje (court at Gomirje), with an area of 79 square kilometres (31 mi^{2}), belonged to the kotar of Ogulin (Ogulin court and electoral district) in the županija of Modruš-Rieka (Ogulin high court and financial board). There were 355 houses (384 in 1910), with a population of 2522 (the lowest in Ogulin kotar): 1251 male and 1271 female; 2003 in 1910. The majority were Croatian or Serbian speakers, but 6 spoke Slovene, 6 Hungarian and 2 German. The majority were Eastern Orthodox, but 202 were Catholic and 4 were Jewish. Its 11 villages and 9 hamlets were divided for taxation purposes into 2 porezne obćine, under the Ogulin office.

In 1910, the entire općina had no resident soldiers. Militarily, Gomirje fell under the 26th Landwehr Infantry Regiment and 26th Landsturm Infantry Brigade, both at Karlovac.

Besides Gomirje itself, settlements encompassed by Gomirje općina in 1890 were: Đurić Brdo (14 houses, 88 people), Kolostaj (10 houses, 93 people), Kovačevići (2 houses, 26 people), Luke (12 houses, 66 people), Majer, Musulinski Kraj, Polovine (14 houses, 87 people), Ranići (5 houses, 38 people), Zelići (2 houses, 18 people), Kosanović Brdo (14 houses, 121 people), Ljubošina, Rabatić Poljana, Brezova Poljana, Trnova Poljana, Hambarište, Stubica, Tuk, Vujnović Selo. Of those, the following were considered hamlets of Gomirje: Đurić Brdo, . Gomirje proper had 49 houses, 423 people, a post office, a telegraph, and a school attended by all hamlets but Kovačevići (which attended the school in Vrbovsko). With hamlets, Gomirje had 155 houses, 1087 people.

=== Further reading ===
- Kraljevski zemaljski statistički ured (1903). Političko i sudbeno razdieljenje i Repertorij prebivališta Kraljevina Hrvatske i Slavonije po stanju od 1. travnja 1903. Zagreb: Kraljevska hrvatsko-slavonsko-dalmatinska zemaljska vlada, 🖶 Kraljevska zemaljska tiskara.
- Kraljevski zemaljski statistički ured (May 1913). "Repertorij prebivališta po županijama, upravnim kotarima, gradovima, upravnim i poreznim općinama". Političko i sudbeno razdjeljenje i Repertorij prebivališta Kraljevina Hrvatske i Slavonije po stanju od 1. siječnja 1913. Zagreb: Kraljevska hrvatsko-slavonsko-dalmatinska zemaljska vlada, 🖶 Kraljevska zemaljska tiskara. pp. 1–126. Page 22.

== Religion ==
In 1835, Gomirje Monastery administered Drežnica, Moravica, Vrbovsko, Ponikve, Marindol and Bojanci.

== Governance ==
=== National ===
Representatives of the Gomirje Monastery at the Sabor: (Note: At the 1861 sabor, all Orthodox monasteries had a single representative, Anatolije Jovanović (zastupnik), together with Samuilo Popović (predstavnik) and Maksim Vuksanović. In 1865 it was Dionizije Popović.)

- Sebastian Ilić (1848)

==== 1920 ====
At the 1920 Kingdom of Serbs, Croats and Slovenes Constitutional Assembly election in Modruš-Rijeka County, Gomirje voted mainly for the Democratic Party.

Results at the poll in Gomirje
| Year | Voters | Electors | NRS | DSD | KPJ | HPSS | Independent | SS | HSP | HZ |
|---|---|---|---|---|---|---|---|---|---|---|
| 1920 | 526 | 394 | 1 | 388 | 2 | 1 | | | 1 | 1 |

=== Local ===
As of its foundation on 3 March 2008, it is the seat of a local committee encompassing Musulini, Majer and Kamensko. Presidents of local committee:

- Nikola Mamula (2008)
- Rade Mrvoš (2009)
- Đurđica Polovina (2013, 2017)
- Nemanja Musulin (2021), Independent

When the Vlachs of Gomirje requested a confirmation of their Uskok rights throughout the territory they inhabited in 1605, they listed its boundaries as stretching from Mali Klek – Ustanke (the confluence of the Vitunjčica and the Dobra) – Vrbica – Kamensko – Vrbovsko – Plešivica – Mošenski – Bilek – "Potschovodo" – Topolovica – Okrugljik – Radigojna – Gornji Lazi.

In 2020, the option of dividing Vrbovsko into 4 municipalities (Croatian: općine) was being considered, one being Gomirje.

== Culture ==
As of 2009, Gomirje hosts an annual Cvjetni korzo. As a part of the festival, a competition was held to decide on the house with the most beautiful garden beginning in 2013 for the first time since 1966.

== Sports ==
The "Gorski Kotar Bike Tour", held annually since 2012, sometimes goes through Gomirje, such as in the third leg for 2022.

== Infrastructure ==
Gomirje has a post office, an infirmary, an Udaljeni pretplatnički stupanj (UPS).

The water storage unit in Kosanovići, with a capacity of 100 cubic metres (3,500 ft^{3}) at an elevation of 528.3 metres (1,733 ft), uses on the Draškovac pumping station at 356.62 metres (1,170.0 ft), with 9.5 l/s flow. It is responsible for Gomirje.

== Sights ==
- Gomirje Monastery - the westernmost Orthodox monastery

== Notable natives and residents ==
- Danilo Ljubotina (1660-1739), Metropolitan of Gornji Karlovac
- Danilo Jakšić (1715-1771), Metropolitan of Gornji Karlovac
- Simeon Baltić (1727 - after 1780), monk and icon painter
- Jovan Grbić (1736-1788), monk and icon painter
- Vikentije Ljuština (1761-1805), theologist, historian and philologist
- Sava Mrkalj (1783-1833), linguist, grammarian, philologist and poet
- Lazar Mamula (1795-1878) - baron, general in the general in Austro-Hungarian army and governor of Dalmatia
- Samuilo Ilić (1795-1863), Abbot of Novo Hopovo Monastery
- Grigorije Živković (1839-1908), Metropolitan of Zvornik and Tuzla
- Miloš Grujić) (1861-1910), Metropolitan of Gornji Karlovac
- Veljko Vujanović) (1878-1961), Abbot of Velće Monastery
- Teofan Kosanović (1881-1941), Abbot of Gomirje Monastery
- Ljubomir Zloković (1911-1990), Metropolitan of Gornji Karlovac
- Dimitrije Balać (1913-1979), Serbian Orthodox Bishop of Australia and New Zealand
- Bogdan Mamula (1918-2002) - antifascist, partisan and People's Hero of Yugoslavia
- Desanka Đorđević (1927-2011) - dancer and folk dance choreographer in the National Ensemble of Folk Dances and Songs of Serbia, Ensemble "Kolo"
- Bogdan Mrvoš (1939-1997), poet, essayist and literary critic
- Paraskeva Topić (b. 1945), Abbess of Gomirje Monastery
- Vasilije Vadić (b. 1946), Bishop of Srem
- Mihailo Vukčević (b. 1967), Abbot of Gomirje Monastery

== Bibliography ==
- Gungula (1883-09-05) [written 1883-08-30]. "U Gomirju (Dopis)". Narodne novine (in Serbo-Croatian). Vol. 49, no. 203. p. 4.
- VOS (2020-12-21). "VOS 19. / 20. prosinca 2020". Hrvatska vatrogasna zajednica (in Serbo-Croatian). Archived from the original on 2021-04-16.
- Melem Hajdarović, Mihela (2023-06-14). "Glavačeva karta Hrvatske iz 1673. – njezini toponimi, geografski sadržaj i historijskogeografski kontekst" [Glavač’s map of Croatia from 1673: Its toponyms, geographical content, and historical-geographical context]. Studia lexicographica. 17 (32): 47–78. doi:10.33604/sl.17.32.2. eISSN 2459-5578.
- VOS (2024-03-22). "DVOC 21. / 22. ožujak 2024". Hrvatska vatrogasna zajednica (in Serbo-Croatian). Archived from the original on 2024-07-26.
- Blotnej, Bogdan (2024-03-22). "U noći planuo dio pilane kraj Vrbovskog, požar topio prozore". 24sata (in Serbo-Croatian). eISSN 2303-7628. Archived from the original on 2024-03-22.
- Tatar, Nensi (2024-03-24). "Obavljen očevid: Policija i protupožarni inspektor utvrdili uzrok požara pilane". Gorske novosti (in Serbo-Croatian). Archived from the original on 2024-03-31.
