= Vrbovsko =

Vrbovsko Врбовско (Serbian)
- Town
- Grad Vrbovsko; Town of Vrbovsko
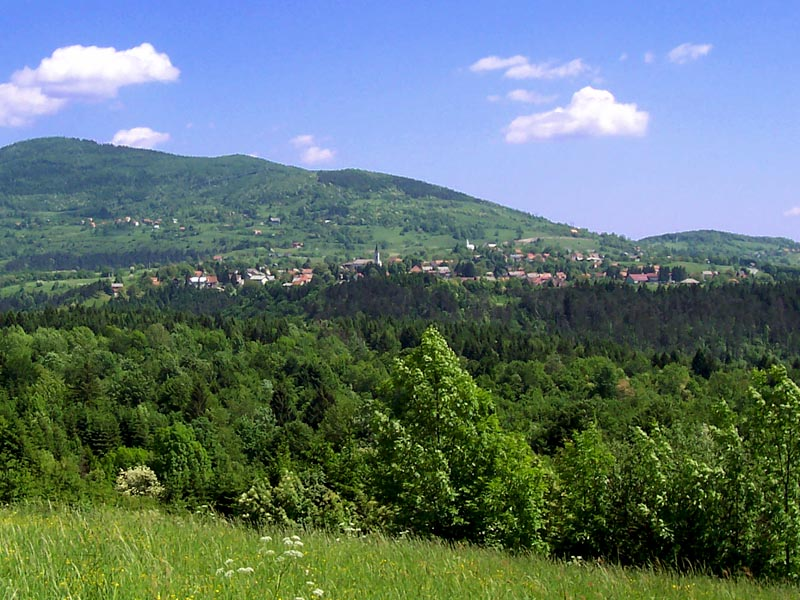
- Interactive map of Vrbovsko
- Location of Vrbovsko in Croatia
- Coordinates: 45.375°N 15.079°E
- Country: Croatia
- Region: Mountainous Croatia (Gorski Kotar)
- County: Primorje-Gorski Kotar County

Government
  - Mayor: Dražen Mufić (Ind.)

Area
  - Town: 279.9 km^{2} (108.1 sq mi)
  - Urban: 10.8 km^{2} (4.2 sq mi)
- Elevation: 506 m (1,660 ft)

Population (2021)
  - Town: 3,876
  - Density: 13.85/km^{2} (35.87/sq mi)
  - Urban: 1,257
  - Urban density: 116/km^{2} (301/sq mi)
- Time zone: UTC+1 (CET)
  - Summer (DST): UTC+2 (CEST)
- Postal code: 51326
- Area code: 051
- Vehicle registration: RI
- Website: vrbovsko.hr

Vrbovsko (Serbian Cyrillic: Врбовско) is a town in western Croatia, situated at the far east of the mountainous region of Gorski Kotar in the Primorje-Gorski Kotar County; on its 280 square kilometers area, Vrbovsko features 60 settlements and a total of 3876 inhabitants. The town of Vrbovsko itself has a population of 1257. The Kamačnik canyon is its main source of tourism.

== Name ==
It was recorded as Verbouzko on the 1673 map of Stjepan Glavač.

== Geography ==
In the north, river Kupa separates Vrbovsko from adjoining Slovenia, while the eastern border follows the line of Zdihovo, Liplje and Bosiljevo settlements and cuts through the river Dobra valley near Ljubošina. The western border starts at the Kupa gorge at Radočaj, goes around Razdrto and passes over the railway tracks between Koritnik Veliki and Palež, continues to Lužac and ends in Sušica-Jablan area. The southern border is the highest in its relief characteristics – it runs along mountain peaks at an altitude of 1000 meters or higher. Debela Kosa (1169 m), Bukovica (1253 m), Bijela kosa (1289 m), Mirkovica (1283 m), and Smolnik (1219 m) peaks are especially distinguishable by their beauty, forests and height. Towards the east, the border continues over Kozarice and Lombarda passes, and ends in the river Dobra valley, thus rounding off Vrbovsko area.

The geographical position of Vrbovsko that places it along the transit lines halfway between Zagreb and Rijeka is of extreme importance. Good rail and highway connections provide for quick access to Vrbovsko.

The Kamačnik canyon is nearby.

== History ==
Vrbovsko was first mentioned on 22 February 1481 in a document freeing the citizens of Grič from tariffs in Vrbovsko and elsewhere.

After the Turkish invasion, Vrbovsko was eventually incorporated into the Austrian Military Frontier.

In 1710, the Sv. Antona chapel was built.

The construction of the Karolina in 1732 raised its economic importance significantly.

In 1765, it was removed from the Military Frontier.

In 1755–56, original parish church Sv. Ivana Nepomuka, dedicated to Saint John of Nepomuk,

In 1780, Maurice Benyovszky received permission from the emperor to found a society to support the transport of goods along the Karolina road. Such societies already existed in Vrbovsko, Fužine and Karlovac.

In 1785, it was declared a royal free city, and was granted a city magistrate and court.

The canonical visitation of the Vrbovsko parish by bishop Aldrago Antonio de Piccardi occurred on 17 July 1789.

The canonical visitation of the Vrbovsko parish by bishop Ivan Krstitelj Ježić occurred on 10 July 1796 while Gabrijel Vukšić was parish priest in Vrbovsko. A 3 folio list drawn up by Vukšić survives in the archive of the Archdiocese of Senj.

In 1843, beginning with the 16th November issue of Pesti Hírlap, there was a proposal in the Hungarian press to build a wagonway through the Jozefina then up to Vrbovsko and from there along the Lujzijana, but because of the steep grade from Brod na Kupi to Rijeka, they changed the plan for the wagonway to be drawn to Senj instead of Rijeka, only for the protest of both Rijeka and Karlovac to kill the plan altogether.

On 21 February 1852 by a decree of the Ban of Croatia and Slavonia, Josip Jelačić, a Chamber of Commerce and Industry (Croatian: Trgovačko-obrtna komora) was to be founded in Rijeka with jurisdiction over Vrbovsko. It was founded, and began to function on the 11th of March that year.

In 1860–1879, Matija Mažuranić wrote a 62 folio manuscript today titled Writings on the Building of Roads in Gorski Kotar and Lika (Croatian: Spisi o gradnji cesta u Gorskom Kotaru i Lici), today with signature HR-ZaNSK R 6424.

In 1887, Sv. Ivana Nepomuka was demolished because of its state, the new church being finished in 1895, only to be demolished in 1901 and rebuilt again in 1904 as the present building, in Neo-Gothic style.

The DVD Vrbovsko was founded in 1890. Like most volunteer fire departments in the region, it has taken on a larger societal role than its city counterparts, to the point of having its own brass band. Today the DVD Vrbovsko is one of the components of the VZ grada Vrbovsko. The current VZ commander is Mario Mužević, and the DVD commander is Dalibor Mareković.

In 1900, the cemetery chapel Gospe Karmelske, dedicated to Our Lady of Mount Carmel, was built in 1900.

=== WWI ===
In September 1914, the epidemic of an undetermined disease led Austria to prohibit the import of swine from Vrbovsko kotar.

=== Kingdom of Yugoslavia ===
A 22 December 1939 decision as part of agrarian reforms by Ban Šubašić to confiscate the forest property in Vrbovsko and surroundings of the Thurn and Taxis family, Kálmán Ghyczy and Nikola Petrović resulted in a legal dispute known as the Thurn and Taxis Affair, in part because of the relative status of the family and in part because of the proximity to the Italian border.

=== WWII ===
==== 1941 ====
During WWII, 273 people were killed from the kotar of Vrbovsko, of which 101 by Croats, 56 by Italians, 48 by Serbs, 12 by Germans and 12 by Bulgarians.

On 13 April 1941, Ante Pavelić passed through Vrbovsko on his way to Zagreb, awaited by a number of Ustaše who cheered him on. Along with Ravna Gora and Mrkopalj, Vrbovsko was one of the only places in Gorski Kotar that already had Ustaše.

In May, the Ustaše began arresting prominent Serbian men in Vrbovsko, focusing on known or suspected JRZ and Chetnik members or sympathisers.

From 28 May through 1 June, about numerous arrests were made in Ogulin, Vrbovsko and the surrounding areas. Most were arrested at the market or returning from it. The arrested were then held in the Ogulin castle. This was in connection with a visit of Lovre Sušić to Ogulin, ostensibly for his security. Few survived this arrest.

On 3 June, an Ustaša rally was held in Vrbovsko, attended by 3000, concurrent with a 12,000 strong rally in Ogulin.

On 1 July, Pavelić founded the Velika župa Modruš with its seat in Ogulin, by merging Ogulin with Slunj, Vrbovsko and Delnice.

In July, when the deportations of Serbs to accommodate the Slovenes of the population exchange commenced, the logornik in Vrbovsko informed his superiors that all the Serbs were in Moravice apart from two retired Serb gunmen in Severin na Kupi. For the temporary accommodation of Slovenes in Vrbovsko, the barracks for railway construction were offered for the housing of 150 people, the Vatrogasni dom for 100 people, the Narodni dom for 50 people and the depot of the match factory for 50 people.

==== 1942 ====
At 10:00 on 24 February 1942, a group of about 300 "Communists" with automatic weapons arrived in the area of Ogulin and above Hreljin and Kučaj. Until 14:00, they blocked the road to Ogulin, after which they retreated to Gomirje. For 3–4 days they appeared from time to time in the area of Ogulin, Hreljin, Vrbovsko and Gomirje, then Gornje Dubrave, Gomirje and Jasenak.

On 4–5 June, rebels carried out a number of minor thefts in the Vrbovsko area.

At 5:00 on 19 June, the train tracks between Hrvatske Moravice and Vrbovsko were disassembled. When an Italian military patrol happened upon the tracks, it was attacked with a machine gun from the forest, which killed one soldier. The attack on the patrol was then repelled. (Note: More on this attack in volume V,5, document 57.)

When the German and Italian Zones of Influence were revised on 24 June 1942, Vrbovsko fell in Zone II, administered civilly by Croatia but militarily by Italy.

==== 1945 ====
At the behest of Dušan Rašković, Ruđe Miloš deacon of the Vrbovsko deaconate and parish priest of Divjake, Rikard Valić honorary president of the spiritual see and parish priest of Vrbovsko, and others gathered in Delnice signed a document recognising the JNOF on 21 February 1945, selecting a delegation to represent the priesthood before their authority.

=== SFR Yugoslavia ===
At the end of the war, Vrbovsko's municipal notary (Croatian: općinski bilježnik) and legal representative of Vladimir Arko, Matija Paviša, was in Ogulin with Ante Pocrnić. Paviša warned Pocrnić not to return to Vrbovsko, which he did anyway, being mobilised by the Partisans and sent off to the Istrian front, where he died. Fearing retribution, Paviša retreated with the Ustaša column towards Austria, avoiding the Bleiburg repatriations, however, because he became ill with the flu on the way and returned to Vrbovsko. There, he was arrested and put on trial before judge Floršić, a Jewish judge of the new administration, who merely sentenced him to temporary house arrest until the political situation calmed down. After rehabilitation, Paviša served as a misdemeanor judge and then as the municipality secretary until retirement.

=== Recent ===
In the 2010s, the Presvete Euharistije chapel was built in the basement of the parish priest's house.

On 30 August 2012, a leak in Vrbovsko forced a water shutoff in the town.

Vrbovsko was hit by the 2014 Dinaric ice storm. From 31 January to 2 February 2014, while S and SW geostrophic wind dominated, freezing rain fell on Gorski Kotar, glazing the entire region. It wrecked roofs, power lines and forests, causing power loss for about 14,000 households in Gorski Kotar, or about 80% of its population. Because of power lines falling on the A6, the highway was closed in of Rijeka between Bosiljevo and Kikovica, and between Kikovica and Delnice in the direction of Zagreb. It took about 10 days to restore essential infrastructure to the region, and within months electricity was back in most of its former range, but at a cost of about 84.4 million HRK to HEP, whose Elektroprimorje Rijeka branch was responsible for restoring electricity in most of the affected area. At the time it was the largest peacetime damage since the Secession from Yugoslavia, even without counting the forestry losses. Thanks to relatively mild ice accumulation (SPIA 4), the Šumarija Vrbovsko fared well relative to western forestry branches, losing mainly diseased and very poorly anchored trees. Clearing blocked forestry roads and forest paths would take years, and thanks to the declining population some were never cleared. A dedicated winter service base of the Komunalac Vrbovsko was set up in Vrbovsko to assist with repairs; alongside the local volunteer firefighters and Luko d.o.o. they had been doing most of the initial work in clearing the roads. Most of Vrbovsko's municipal area was left without electricity, and because of that loss of electricity the pumps for water supply stopped working, including the one at Ribnjak in Gladi, leaving 85% of town residents without tap water as well. During the day of the 3rd, HEP restored power to Ribnjak with an engine–generator, and in the evening electricity was restored to most of Vrbovsko itself. Some remained without power for 5 days.

On 12 December 2017, a severe wind hit Vrbovsko, leaving its elementary school without a roof and blocking traffic in the area.

On 8 June 2018, the Lovnik water storage unit was found to have a coliform bacteria concentration of 391/100ml, while the Hambarište water storage unit had a concentration of 570/100ml, and both Escherichia coli and Enterococcus bacteria were present. The same day, hail up to 4 centimetres (1.6 in) in diameter fell on the territory of Vrbovsko, although worse fell in Blaževci, Štefanci and in White Carniola.

In 2021, the old Mance house was reconstructed, an infant day care centre was added to the kindergarten "Bambi" in Vrbovsko and a recycling yard was built.

In late 2021, a new water tank Senjsko II was installed

In 2023, many of Vrbovsko's yet-unpaved streets were asphalted: Jelovac, Gladi – Mlinari, Dragovići, Komlenići, Kovačevići toward Zelići, and Gvozdeni.

== Demographics ==
Vrbovsko municipality map

As of 2021, there were only 487 inhabitants under the age of 20 in the township, and 171 in the urbanity.

In 2011, 60.1% of the population were Croats and 35.2% were Serbs.

Township of Vrbovsko: Population trends 1857–2021
v

population	10064	10601	11391	11920	11001	10230	9663	10825	8714	9077	8663	8411	7344	7528	6047	5076	3876
	1857	1869	1880	1890	1900	1910	1921	1931	1948	1953	1961	1971	1981	1991	2001	2011	2021

Note:Formed from the old municipality of Vrbovsko. Part of its population was under Ogulin from 1910 to 1931. Sources: Croatian Bureau of Statistics publications

In 1870, Vrbovsko općina had 324 houses and 2427 people.

By early 1919, 8234 people had emigrated from Delnice Kotar to the United States and 1121 to other countries.

Urbanity of Vrbovsko: Population trends 1857–2021
v

population	1216	1346	1423	1506	1490	1306	1269	1531	1395	1736	1945	2037	1993	2047	1894	1673	1257
	1857	1869	1880	1890	1900	1910	1921	1931	1948	1953	1961	1971	1981	1991	2001	2011	2021

Note:Includes Senjsko (independent from 1910 to 1961). In 2001, part of Hambarište and Vujnovići were added but part of Vrbovsko was transferred to Stubica, and Poljana to Tuk. For the enlarged part the population is under Hambarište and Vujnovići from 1857 to 1991, and for the removed part in the same period the population is under Stubica, Poljana and Tuk. Sources: Croatian Bureau of Statistics publications

In 1835, the part of Vrbovsko in the Military Frontier belonged to Ogulin. In that part, there were 36 houses, with a population of 338.

In 1870, Vrbovsko proper had 188 houses and 1346 people.

=== Further reading ===
- Kraljevski zemaljski statistički ured (1903). Političko i sudbeno razdieljenje i Repertorij prebivališta Kraljevina Hrvatske i Slavonije po stanju od 1. travnja 1903. Zagreb: Kraljevska hrvatsko-slavonsko-dalmatinska zemaljska vlada, 🖶 Kraljevska zemaljska tiskara.
- Kraljevski zemaljski statistički ured (1910). Imenik prebivališta u Kralj. Hrvatskoj i Slavoniji po županijama, upravnim kotarima te upravnim i poreznim obćinama. Zagreb: Kraljevska hrvatsko-slavonsko-dalmatinska zemaljska vlada, 🖶 Kraljevska zemaljska tiskara.
- Kraljevski zemaljski statistički ured (May 1913). "Repertorij prebivališta po županijama, upravnim kotarima, gradovima, upravnim i poreznim općinama". Političko i sudbeno razdjeljenje i Repertorij prebivališta Kraljevina Hrvatske i Slavonije po stanju od 1. siječnja 1913. Zagreb: Kraljevska hrvatsko-slavonsko-dalmatinska zemaljska vlada, 🖶 Kraljevska zemaljska tiskara. pp. 1–126. Page 33.
- Kraljevski zemaljski statistički ured (May 1913). "Promjene u političkoj razdiobi kralj. Hrvatske i Slavonije izvedene od 1. ožujka 1903. do 1. siječnja 1913.". Političko i sudbeno razdjeljenje i Repertorij prebivališta Kraljevina Hrvatske i Slavonije po stanju od 1. siječnja 1913. Zagreb: Kraljevska hrvatsko-slavonsko-dalmatinska zemaljska vlada, 🖶 Kraljevska zemaljska tiskara. pp. 1–126.

=== Villages ===
The list of settlements in the municipality of Vrbovsko as of 2021 is:

- Blaževci, population 34 ▼
- Bunjevci, population 28 ▼
- Carevići, population 13 ▼
- Damalj, population 19 ▼
- Dokmanovići, population 36 ▼
- Dolenci, population 8
- Donji Vučkovići, population 16 ▼
- Donji Vukšići, population 7 ▼
- Draga Lukovdolska, population 18 ▼
- Dragovići, population 6
- Gomirje, population 255 ▼
- Gorenci, population 38 ▼
- Gornji Vučkovići, population 10 ▼
- Gornji Vukšići, population 0
- Hajdine, population 51 ▼
- Hambarište, population 34 ▼
- Jablan, population 177 ▼
- Jakšići, population 42 ▼
- Kamensko, population 0 ▼
- Klanac, population 31 ▼
- Komlenići, population 4 ▼
- Lesci, population 0
- Liplje, population 58 ▼
- Lukovdol, population 104 ▼
- Ljubošina, population 126 ▼
- Majer, population 9 ▼
- Mali Jadrč, population 28 ▼
- Matići, population 10 ▼
- Međedi, population 0
- Mlinari, population 7
- Močile, population 75 ▼
- Moravice, population 509 ▼
- Musulini, population 112 ▼
- Nadvučnik, population 20 ▼
- Nikšići, population 23 ▼
- Osojnik, population 86 ▼
- Petrovići, population 14 ▼
- Plemenitaš, population 38
- Plešivica, population 8 ▼
- Podvučnik, population 0
- Poljana, population 8
- Presika, population 12 ▼
- Radigojna, population 11 ▼
- Radočaj, population 0
- Radoševići, population 18 ▼
- Rim, population 30 ▼
- Rtić, population 7 ▼
- Severin na Kupi, population 113 ▼
- Smišljak, population 13 ▼
- Stubica, population 30 ▼
- Štefanci, population 2 ▼
- Tići, population 9 ▼
- Tomići, population 12 ▼
- Topolovica, population 2 ▼
- Tuk, population 47 ▼
- Veliki Jadrč, population 49 ▼
- Vrbovsko, population 1257 ▼
- Vučinići, population 58 ▼
- Vučnik, population 12 ▼
- Vujnovići, population 32 ▼
- Vukelići, population 17 ▼
- Zapeć, population 10 ▲
- Zaumol, population 27 ▼
- Zdihovo, population 29 ▲
- Žakule, population 8 ▼

=== Demographic evolution ===
Vrbovsko was the administrative seat of the Vrbovski kotar with an area of 270.1 square kilometres (104.3 mi^{2}) in 1869/1870. In 1811, at the time under Karlovac district, the Vrbovski kanton comprised the kotari of Vrbovsko with a population of 1971 in 5 villages, Severin and Bosiljevo.

In 1870, Vrbovsko općina, in Delnice podžupanija, had 324 houses, with a population of 2427. Its 5 villages were encompassed by a single porezna obćina for taxation purposes. Their parish was also Vrbovsko, excepting Hajdini whose Eastern Orthodox parish was Komorske Moravice.

Religion in Vrbovsko Municipality (1890 census)
Religion	Percentage
Catholics	89.5%
Eastern Orthodox	9.5%
Jews	0.4%
Protestants	0.2%
Eastern Catholics	0.04%

In 1890, the općina of Vrbovsko, with an area of 37 square kilometres (14 mi^{2}), belonged to the kotar of Vrbovsko, with an area of 413 kilometres (257 mi) and its own court and electoral district, in the županija of Modruš-Rieka (Ogulin court and financial board). In Vrbovsko općina, there were 373 houses (409 in 1910), with a population of 2480: 1143 male and 1337 female; 2142 in 1910. The majority were Croatian or Serbian speakers, but 24 spoke German, 23 Slovene, 18 Hungarian, 5 Czech, 1 Hungarian, 1 German and 8 spoke other languages. The majority were Catholic, but 235 were Eastern Orthodox, 10 Jewish, 6 Protestant and 1 Eastern Catholic. Its 5 villages and 20 hamlets were encompassed for taxation purposes by a single porezna općina, under the Delnice office. In the 413 square kilometres (159 mi^{2}) Vrbovsko kotar, there were a total of 3060 houses, with a population of 19,307. Its 115 villages were divided into 32 porezne oćine. The kotar had 2 markets, one being in Vrbovsko and the other in Ravna Gora. Vrbovsko kotar was divided into 5 općine. Besides itself: Bosiljevo, Komorske Moravice, Ravna gora and Severin.

In 1910, the općina had 4 resident soldiers. Militarily, Vrbovsko fell under the 26th Landwehr Infantry Regiment and 26th Landsturm Infantry Brigade, both at Karlovac.

In 1890, Vrbovsko itself had 63 houses and 442 people. The hamlets surrounding it were: Amerika or Tominkina Draga (8 houses, 39 people), Bakarska Draga (11 houses, 68 people), Blažev Brieg (2 houses, 11 people), Dobra (15 houses, 127 people), Jelovac (4 houses, 21 people), Kalajčin Potok (7 houses, 31 people), Klajner Brdo (13 houses, 100 people), Lisičev Brieg (2 houses, 19 people), Mrzle Drage (3 houses, 25 people), Podhrzač (2 houses, 17 people), Podkraj (3 houses, 12 people), Rožman Brdo (12 houses, 64 people), Senjsko (83 houses, 566 people), Skakavac (5 houses, 39 people). These townspeople and villagers were under Komorske Moravice Orthodox and Vrbovsko Catholic parishes, and Vrbovsko school, tax and administrative districts. Vrbovsko had 3 schools and Senjsko had 1. Vrbovsko had a post office, a telegraph, a train station, a gendarmerie and a financial guard.

== Religion ==
Ecclesiastically, the Vrbovsko parish is under the Delnice diaconate, in turn under the Rijeka Archdiocese. Its Catholic parish was founded in 1790, and its parish church was built in 1894. In 1939, its parish had 3325 souls, plus 932 outside the country. In 1974, its parish had 2700 souls, plus 300 outside the country.

List of parish priests of Vrbovsko:

- Gabrijel Vukšić (1796)
- ...
- Petar Butković (b. Bilaj 1910-08-10, primiz Gospić 1935-06-23)
- ...
- Josip Jonaš (b. Buenos Aires 1913-11-04, primiz Senj 1939-06-29)
- ...
- Ivan Androić (January 2012 – September 2019), transferred to Ičići
- Hrvoje Poljak (September 2019 –)

== Dialect ==
Dialect levelling is active, and preservation efforts are sporadic. Beginning in 2022, a dialectal competition and literature festival for children was introduced, Goranski Cukrac, to be held annually throughout Gorski Kotar for the purpose of motivation and practice. It was held again in 2023, and in 2024. Then in 2025, the Vrbovsko elementary school won the 4th installment.

=== Official usage of Serbian minority language ===
The Town of Vrbovsko has officially introduced the Serbian language with Serbian Cyrillic alphabet as the equal co-official language. The town Statute guarantees the Serb national minority in Vrbovsko the right to proportional representation in the city's legislative, executive, and administrative bodies. It also includes provisions on the establishment of the local Council of the Serb National Minority as an advisory body. Vrbovsko ensures that public signage, official documents, public records, and other official communications are available in both languages and scripts, using the same font size for each. Additionally, in the settlements of Bunjevci, Carevići, Dokmanovići, Donji Vučkovići, Donji Vukšići, Dragovići, Gomirje, Gornji Vučkovići, Gornji Vukšići, Hajdine, Hambarište, Jakšići, Kamensko, Komlenići, Ljubošina, Majer, Matići, Međedi, Mlinari, Moravice, Musulini, Nikšići, Petrovići, Presika, Radigojna, Radoševići, Tići, Tomići, Topolovica, Tuk, Vučinići, Vujnovići, Vukelići, and Žakule, the names of streets, squares, places, and geographical locations are written in both languages and scripts, using the same font size.

In November 2023, the Government of the Republic of Croatia decided to declare an end to mandatory bilingualism in Vrbovsko on the basis of the 2021 census, which showed the Serbian population fraction had fallen below the required one third, at 32.38%. While this did impact funding, the existence of guarantees at the municipal level prevented any change.

== Economy ==
Vrbovsko has a rapidly growing tourism industry. In Gorski Kotar as of 2020, 12% of businesses were in, 7% of workers were employed in, and 3% of the profits were from, tourism. As of 2018 Vrbovsko township, including its municipal area, had a total 1 hostel, 1 mountain hut, 2 hunting lodges, 14 apartments and 20 holiday houses, with a total of 267 beds (compared to 170 in 2014).

In the first 11 months of 2018 there were 10,849 overnight stays in the township, a 34% increase from 2017 and 130% from 2016. This growth trend stopped in 2019 with only 9794 overnight stays (only 9% of Gorski Kotar's count for that year), followed by the COVID-19 pandemic in 2020. 45% of overnight stays in 2018 were from within the Republic of Croatia, 16% from Germany, 7% each from the Netherlands and Slovenia, 3.2% from the US, 2.5% each from BiH and Belgium, followed by the UK, France, Hungary and so on. For comparison, in 2014 there were only 5802 overnight stays from a total of 1306 visitors, of which 61% were domestic.

Tourism was hit hard by the internal travel restrictions during the COVID-19 pandemic in Croatia, which caused the local branch of the National Tourist Board, the Turistička zajednica Grada Vrbovsko, founded in 1993, to close its office. But the Turistička zajednica Gorskog kotara (TZGK) was founded to cover that region later in 2020. The TZGK is headquartered in Delnice, but its president alternates annually between the mayors and općinski načelnici of its constituent towns and minicipalities, including the mayor of Vrbovsko.

In February 2014, the TZGV website was translated into German and in 2015 the "Moj Gost" system was introduced to allow for online registration of guests to take over the previous system of physically handing in documents to the police in Vrbovsko.

The farmers' market in Vrbovsko fell out of use for a time, but was resurrected on 12 May 2020, to be held every second Tuesday of the month.

A large, international pumpkin festival (Croatian: Bundevijada) has been held annually in Vrbovsko since 2005, founded by Gani Ramadani, an Albanian from North Macedonia who moved to Tuk but was told pumpkins would not do well in the climate. The 2024 edition involved 136 stands and over 1000 visitors. The award for the heaviest pumpkin has gone to:

1. 2005:
2. 2006:
3. 2007:
4. 2008:
5. 2009:
6. 2010: (North Macedonia) Gani Ramadani (62 kg)
7. 2011:
8. 2012:
9. 2013:
10. 2014:
11. 2015:
12. 2016:
13. 2017:
14. 2018: (Croatia) Stipe Jurčević (Note: OPG Jurčević of Oštarije) (132 kg)
15. 2019: (Croatia) Stipe Jurčević
16. 2020: (Croatia) Stipe Jurčević (181.7 kg)
17. 2021: (Croatia) Stipe Jurčević
18. 2022: (Croatia) Stipe Jurčević (60 kg)
19. 2023: (Croatia) Stipe Jurčević (122.4 kg)
20. 2024: (Slovenia) Martin Plut (211 kg)
21. 2025: (Slovenia) Martin Plut (310 kg)

The success of the festival spawned a secondary local competition in November beginning in 2020, in which residents decorate their lawn with pumpkins.

In 1877, the nearest savings banks were in Karlovac (opened August 1872), Kraljevica (Note: Primorska štediona) (opened March 1873, bankrupt 1878), Senj (opened March 1873), Bakar (opened July 1876) and Ogulin (opened August 1876). The nearest commercial banks were in Zagreb (the Croatian Discount Bank, founded November 1868, and the Zagreb Commercial Bank, founded March 1873). Credit unions existed in Karlovac (Note: Karlovačka pomoćnica (opened 1872), Štedovni i predujmovni konzorcij I. obćega činovničkoga družtva austro-ugar. monarkije u Karlovcu (opened 1875)) and Jastrebarsko (opened 1875). (Note: Jastrebarska pomoćnica)

== Governance ==
=== National ===
Representatives of the Vrbovsko kotar at the Sabor and Skupština: (Note: "изборни срез")

- Tomislav Cuculić (1848, 1861) (Note: Together with Mrkopalj and Ravna Gora, but in 1861 it was soon decided to separate the three so by-elections were held and Cuculić remained representative only Mrkopalj.)
- Lavoslav Šram (1861)
- Gervazije Petrović (1861)
- Antun Vakanović (1865), US
- Josip Tomac (1868), (Note: Vrbovsko-Delnice) NLS
- Josip Pleše (1868)
- Matija Mrazović (1871) (Note: Delnice-Vrbovsko, simultaneously representing Zagreb I)
- Danilo Pogačnik (1872)
- Franjo Rački (1872), NS/NLS/NNS
- Nikola Tomašić (1892–1897), NLS/IS/NNS
- Ignjat Martinec (1897–1906)
- Pero Magdić (1906–1918), (Note: Simultaneously represented Varaždin 1911–1918.) HSP-HSK, HUSS-HSK
- sede vacante (1918–1923)
- Petar Dobrinić (1923–), HRSS
- ...
- Šime Kulišić (1935–), HSS

At the 1920 Kingdom of Serbs, Croats and Slovenes Constitutional Assembly election in Modruš-Rijeka County, Vrbovsko voted mainly for the Communist Party.

Results at the polls in Vrbovsko
Year	Station	Voters	Electors	NRS	DSD	KPJ	HPSS	Independent	SS	HSP	HZ
1920	I	395	173	2	28	83	11	1	4	2	42
1920	II	441	182		1	141	5		3		32

=== Municipal ===
Vrbovsko kotar/srez was subordinated to Modruš-Rijeka County until 1922 when the latter was replaced with Primorje-Krajina Oblast (an oblast/županija), which was unpopular with most Croats and was as a concession replaced in 1929 with the Sava Banovina.

At the time, Vrbovsko was divided into 5 općine: Bosiljevo, Vrbovsko, Ravna Gora, Severin na Kupi and Srpske Moravice.

In 1997, Vrbovsko was upgraded from a municipality (Croatian: općina) with a municipal president (Croatian: općinski načelnik) to a city (Croatian: grad) with a mayor (Croatian: gradonačelnik).

As of its foundation on 3 March 2008, it is the seat of a local committee encompassing Jablan, Poljana, Vujnovići, Hambarište, Tuk, Stubica, Hajdine and Presika. There are 9 local committees under Vrbovsko: Vrbovsko itself, Moravice, Gomirje, Ljubošina, Lukovdol, Plemenitaš, Severin na Kupi, Jablan and Jadrč-Osojnik.

Mayors of Vrbovsko:

- Anton Mance (1997 – 2009), HDZ
- Željko Mirković (2009-05-31 – 2013-06-02), SDP
- Dražen Mufić (2013-06-02, 2017, 2021), Independent

In 2020, the option of dividing Vrbovsko into 4 municipalities (Croatian: općine) was being considered: Vrbovsko, Moravice, Gomirje and Severin na Kupi/Lukovdol.

=== Local ===
Presidents of local committee:

- Milivoj Matejić (2008)
- Leonida Rački (2009)
- Sanja Bradić (2013)
- Ivan Mužević (2017)
- Anton Burić (2021)

=== Judiciary ===
In 1875, the kotar court of Delnice encompassed a population of 28,347, being responsible for the općine: Delnice, Lokve, Fužine, Mrkopalj, Ravna Gora, Brod, Skrad, Vrbovsko.

In 1910, the kotar court of Vrbovsko encompassed an area of 413 square kilometres (159 mi^{2}), the same as its kotar, with a population of 17,090. Vrbovsko had its own cadastral jurisdiction, but its business court was in Ogulin.

== Culture ==
In spring 1940, the Sjenica breed of sheep in Vrbovsko srez was evaluated.

On 27 January, the city celebrates the city key handover (Croatian: preuzimanje ključeva grada).

In February, Carnival is celebrated in the town, culminating in the participation of its delegations in the Rijeka Carnival.

The city celebrates March 14 as its "City Day" (Croatian: Dan Grada).

In 2000, the an annual mushroom festival Gljivarijada has been held. The Gljivarijada expanded into multiple kettle cooking competitions hosted from late May to early July collectively called "KotlićFest", which together with other events added later became "Super dani vani". It begins with a competition between alpinists, then firefighters, then photographers and it ends in July with the main mushroom goulash competition. The Gljivarijada involves two main awards.

The award for most mushrooms species hunted (since 2000):

1. 2014: GU "Sunčanica" Samobor (72)
2. 2015:
3. 2016:
4. 2017:
5. 2018: GU "Sunčanica" Samobor (66)

The award for best tasting mushroom goulash (since 2004):

1. 2014: GD "Zet" Zagreb
2. 2015:
3. 2016:
4. 2017:
5. 2018: Restoran "Staro gnijezdo" Markuševac
6. 2019: "Flash" Vrbovsko

In September, the Dom kulture in Vrbovsko hosts a wine, honey, cheese and bread festival. The first edition was held on 20 September 2014.

Throughout December, many events take place as part of "Joyful December" (Croatian: Radosni prosinac). Since 2009, the Udruga žena "Senjsko" has hosted a "Vrbovsko Winter Evening" (Croatian: Vrbovščanska zimska večer).

=== Cuisine ===
In August 2021, Vrbovsko resident Valentina Vukadinović started posting recreated recipes from family cookbooks written by Merica Matejić that she found in her husband's house as the column Gorski kotao in the Nada section of Novosti. The success of the column led her to start her own Gorski kotao website.

There is a fast food restaurant in Vrbovsko, Nina.

== Attractions ==
There is a Museum of Ivan Goran Kovačić (Serbo-Croatian: Muzej Ivana Gorana Kovačića) in Vrbovsko and an amphitheatre.

== Sports ==
=== Bowling ===
Vrbovsko is home to the bowling clubs Kamačnik, Policajac and Gomirje, who meet at the Gradska kuglana Vrbovsko. The best bowlers of both teams have competed in the 3rd League, while the local individual record at the bowling alley is 630, set in 2018 by Dario Prađeno.

=== Cycling ===
Beginning in 2013, the 7 stage 260 kilometres (160 mi) long Cycling Trail of Gorski Kotar (Croatian: Goranska biciklistička transverzala) passes through Vrbovsko and Vukmani.

The "Gorski Kotar Bike Tour", held annually since 2012, sometimes involves Vrbovsko, such as in 2014, and in 2018 when the first leg began and ended in Kamačnik and passed through Vrboovsko, as with the third leg of 2022.

=== Sledding ===
Beginning in 2012, a Winter Cup in sledding on natural slopes has been organised in Vrbovsko. From 2016, Sledding races (Croatian: Sanjkaške utrke) from the Planinarski dom "Kamačnik" have been organised in Vrbovsko. In 2019 there was insufficient snow to host either event.

== Infrastructure ==
The water storage unit Kratofil, with a capacity of 154 cubic metres (5,400 ft^{3}) at an elevation of 508.3 metres (1,668 ft), is responsible for Vujnovići and part of Vrbovsko. The unit Sv. Ilija, with a capacity of 500 cubic metres (18,000 ft^{3}) at an elevation of 515 metres (1,690 ft), is responsible for part of Vrbovsko, Hambarište and Smreka. The water storage unit Lovnik, with a capacity of 130 cubic metres (4,600 ft^{3}) at an elevation of 610 metres (2,000 ft), is responsible for part of Vrbovsko and for Hajdine, Presika, Kamensko and Stubica.

Vrbovsko has a post office, an infirmary, the elementary school "Gorana Kovačića", an Udaljeni pretplatnički stupanj (as does Senjsko).

=== Postal ===
On 1 July 1859, a royal post office was opened in Vrbovsko, connected to the post office in Vučinići. Mail would leave Vrbovsko at 12:00 on Sunday, Tuesday, Thursday and Saturday and arrive in Vučinići at 13:30, then leave Vučinići at 14:45 and arrive in Vrbovsko at 16:15. On the territory of Vrbovsko Kotar, the Vrbovsko office was to be responsible for Komlinićbèrdo, Komorske Moravice, Kuzmanovobèrdo, Jablan, Sušice, Kamensko, Preseka, Stubice, Hajdine and Vuinovići. In the territory of the Ogulin regiment, the Vrbovsko office was to be responsible for Gomirje, Linbošina, Poljana, Cerovobèrdo, Girićbèrdo, Musulin, Jasenak, Vrelo, Tuk, Hambarište, Poljana, Vučinićselo and parts of Vrbovsko.

=== Security ===
In 1913, there were 2 gendarmeries in Vrbovsko kotar: Vrbovsko and Severin na Kupi.

=== Education ===
In the school year of 1939–1940, there were 17 schools on the territory of Vrbovsko srez (5 in Bosiljevo, 3 in Ravna Gora, 4 in Severin na Kupi, 2 in Srpske Moravice plus the Građanska škola, 3 in Vrbovsko), with 45 teachers, of which 34 Catholic and 11 Orthodox; there were 1961 students, of which 1626 Catholic, 326 Orthodox and 9 of an unspecified non-Muslim "Other" faith. 57 students obligated to attend did not, or 2.8% of the obligated population, which by national standards was very low.

== Media ==
Novi list is the oldest newspaper still active to regularly cover Vrbovsko. Since 2011, the Senjsko-based Gorske Novosti (Note: Official website) portal has published news for the Gorski Kotar region.

== Notable people ==
- Nikola Hajdin (1923 – 2019)
- Mihaela Matešić, linguist and president of the HDPL 2018–2019.

== Gallery ==
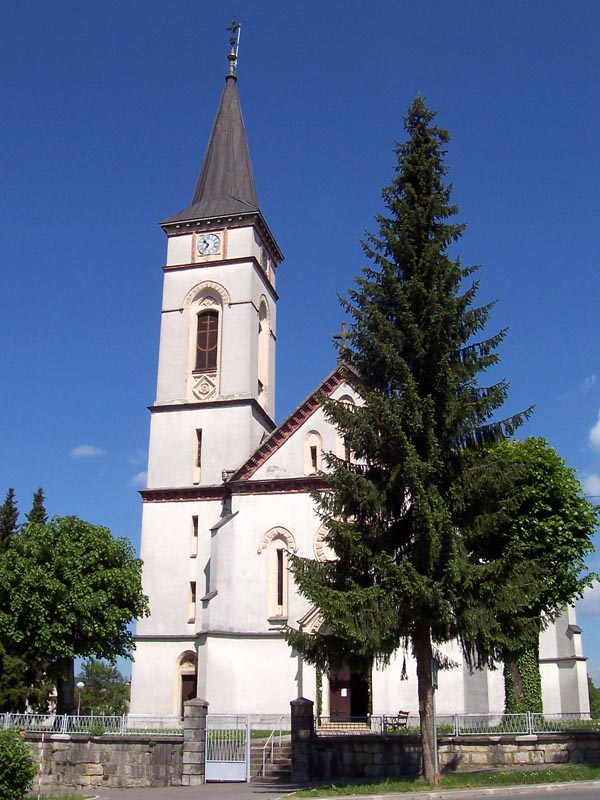
Sv. Ivana Nepomuka church.

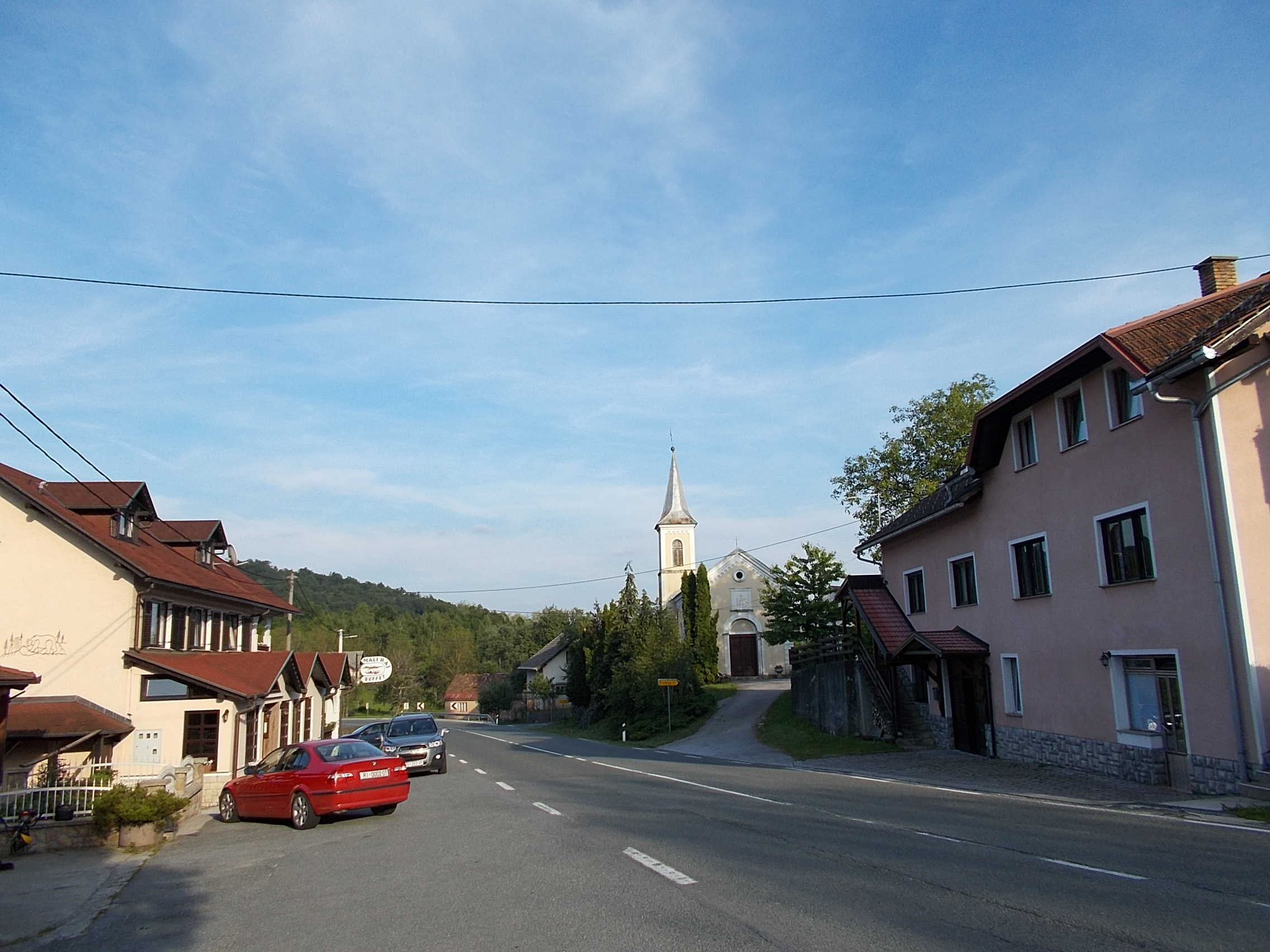
Vrbovsko main street.

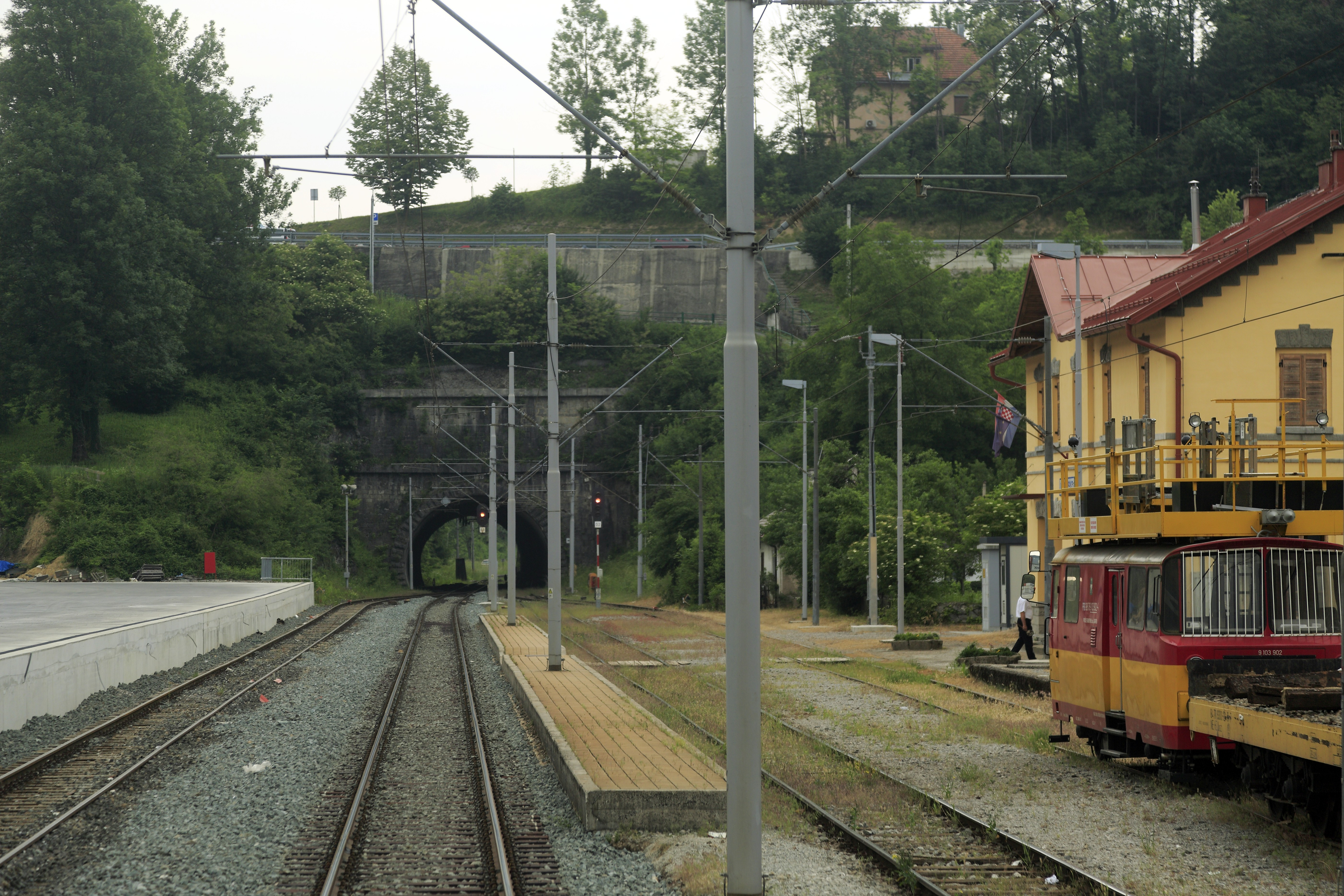
Train station.

== Bibliography (completed) ==
- Klempay, Josip Šimun (1859-06-24) [written 1859-06-16]. "Oglas". Carsko kraljevske službene narodne novine (in Serbo-Croatian). Vol. 25, no. 142. p. 380. ISSN 1333-5243.
- Klempay, Josip Šimun (1859-06-25) [written 1859-06-16]. "Oglas". Carsko kraljevske službene narodne novine (in Serbo-Croatian). Vol. 25, no. 143. p. 384. ISSN 1333-5243.
- Klempay, Josip Šimun (1859-06-28) [written 1859-06-16]. "Oglas". Carsko kraljevske službene narodne novine (in Serbo-Croatian). Vol. 25, no. 146. p. 390. ISSN 1333-5243.
- Костић, Лаза М., ed. (1924). "Табела IV. — Резултати избора (по гласачким местима) 43: Изборни округ Модрушко-Ријечки са Крком и Каставом". Статистика избора народних посланика Краљевине Срба, Хрвата i Словенаца одржаних 18 марта 1923. године (in Serbian). Народна Скупштина Краљевине Срба, Хрвата и Словенаца. pp. 106–108.
- n.s. (1938). "Srez Vrbovski (Vrbovsko)". Статистика избора народних посланика за Народну скупштину Краљевине Југославије извршених 5 маја 1935 године (in Serbian). Народна Скупштина Краљевине Југославије. p. 26.
- Draganović, Krunoslav (1939-04-20). Opći šematizam Katoličke crkve u Jugoslaviji. Sarajevo: Akademija "Regina Apostolorum".
- Draganović, Krunoslav; Bezić, Srećko [in Croatian]; Crnković, Josip; Lešnik, Rafael; Mršo, Ivan [in Croatian]; Reven, Zdravko [in Slovenian]; Weber, Hinko (1975-05-05). Opći šematizam Katoličke Crkve u Jugoslaviji 1974 [General Directory of the Catholic Church in Yugoslavia 1974] (in Serbo-Croatian). Zagreb: Hrvatsko književno društvo sv. Ćirila i Metoda.
- OONF PGO (1945-03-19). "Svećenstvo Gorskog Kotara pristupa JNOf-i". Primorski vjesnik: Glasilo jedinstvene Narodno-oslobodilačke fronte Hrvatskog primorja (in Serbo-Croatian). No. 144. p. 4.
- Grad Vrbovsko (2021b). "Fast Food Nina". Visit Vrbovsko. Archived from the original on 2021-04-17.
- TZGK (2022). "Fast Food Nina". Gorski Kotar - Neodoljiv. Archived from the original on 2022-07-06.
- Melem Hajdarović, Mihela (2023-06-14). "Glavačeva karta Hrvatske iz 1673. – njezini toponimi, geografski sadržaj i historijskogeografski kontekst" [Glavač’s map of Croatia from 1673: Its toponyms, geographical content, and historical-geographical context]. Studia lexicographica. 17 (32): 47–78. doi:10.33604/sl.17.32.2. eISSN 2459-5578.
- Žgela, Ivona (2023-09-11) [defended 2023-09-20]. Izazovi ruralnog turizma Gorskog kotara [Challenges of rural tourism in Gorski kotar] (Thesis) (in Serbo-Croatian). Rijeka: Sveučilište u Rijeci.

== Bibliography ==
- Leksikografski zavod Miroslav Krleža (2013–2024). "Vrbovsko". Hrvatska enciklopedija (online ed.). Archived from the original on 2023-12-26.
- VZPGŽ (November 2023). "Procjena zaštite od požara i tehnoloških eksplozija Grad Vrbovsko". Otvorenost.hr (in Serbo-Croatian). Rijeka: Vatrogasna zajednica Primorsko-goranske županije. Archived from the original on 2025-09-30.

=== Dialectology ===
- Vrbanac, Tanja (2019-10-31). Morfologija deklinabilnih vrsta riječi u govoru Vrbovskoga [Morphology of Declinable Words in the Vrbovsko Dialect] (Thesis) (in Croatian). Rijeka: Sveučilište u Rijeci, Filozofski fakultet (published 2020-07-17).
- Krmpotić, Marinko (2008). "Goransko ča". Sušačka revija. 16 (64): 59–61.
- Matešić, Mihaela (2006). "Frazeologija mjesnoga govora Vrbovskoga". Fluminensia: časopis za filološka istraživanja. 18 (2) (published 2007-02-27): 37–81. eISSN 1848-9680.
- Brabec, Ivan (1966). "Mješoviti govori na sjevernoj periferiji hrvatskosrpskog jezika". Ljetopis Jugoslavenske akademije znanosti i umjetnosti. 77: 421–425. ISSN 0373-9902.
- Barac, Vida; Finka, Božidar (1963). "Ispitivanje govora u Gorskom kotaru". Ljetopis Jugoslavenske akademije znanosti i umjetnosti. 70: 385–389. ISSN 0373-9902.
- Strohal, Rudolf (1903). "Neke dijalektične osobine iz trgovišta Vrbovskoga". Nastavni vjesnik. 11: 548–563. ISSN 1330-7851.

==== Events ====
- Arbanas, Dijana (2023-12-11). "Govor mog zavičaja". Školske novine. ISSN 2991-4507. Archived from the original on 2024-03-21.
- Tatar, Nensi (2023-11-18). "Govor mog zavičaja: Goranski osnovci i ove godine slavili zavičajni govor na tradicionalnom dijalektalnom sijelu: Čast za 31. obilježavanje pripala Čabru i njegovoj Matici hrvatskoj". Gorske novosti. Archived from the original on 2023-11-28.
- Gorske novosti (2022-05-24). "Govor mog zavičaja: Obilježeno 30 godina organiziranja goranskih dijalektalnih sijela". Gorske novosti. Archived from the original on 2022-07-01.
- Gorske novosti (2018-11-19). "Održano 27. goransko dijalektalno sijelo "Govor mog zavičaja"". Gorske novosti. Archived from the original on 2020-09-23.
- Arbanas, Dijana (2016-11-15). "U sklopu mjeseca hrvatske knjige: U Delnicama održano 24. goransko dijalektalno sijelo "Govor mog zavičaja"". Gorske novosti. Archived from the original on 2016-01-15.

=== Folklore ===
- Strohal, Rudolf (1901). Hrvatskih narodnih pripovijedaka, Knjiga II: Narodne pripovijetke iz grada Karlovca, sela Lokava, Delnica i trgovišta Vrbovskoga. Karlovac: Tisak P.L. Weisera.

=== History ===
- Matić, Zdravko (2004-12-22). "Osnivanje i rad "Napretkovih" organizacija na području Hrvatskog primorja i Gorskog kotara (1928. - 1950.)" [The Foundation and Work of "Napredak" Organisations on the Territory of Hrvatsko Primorje and Gorski Kotar]. Časopis za suvremenu povijest (in Croatian). 36 (3): 1183–1204. ISSN 1848-9079.
- Trgo, Fabijan, ed. (1964). Zbornik dokumenata i podataka o Narodno-oslobodilačkom ratu Jugoslovenskih naroda. Vol. V, 32.
- Kruhek, Milan (1984). Općina Vrbovsko: njena prošlost, njena sadašnjost. Vrbovsko, Zagreb: Skupština općine Vrbovsko, Školska knjiga. pp. 24–43.
- Drašković, Blagota, ed. (1984). Općina Vrbovsko: njena prošlost, njena sadašnjost. Vrbovsko, Zagreb: Skupština općine Vrbovsko, Školska knjiga.
- Banska vlast Banovine Hrvatske (1940e). "Srezovi". Godišnjak banske vlasti Banovine Hrvatske (in Croatian). Vol. 1. pp. 330–337.
- Banska vlast Banovine Hrvatske (1940b). "Gospodarska prosvjeta i banovinska dobra". Godišnjak banske vlasti Banovine Hrvatske (in Croatian). Vol. 1. pp. 89–96.
- Banska vlast Banovine Hrvatske (1940). "Stočarstvo". Godišnjak banske vlasti Banovine Hrvatske (in Croatian). Vol. 1. pp. 73–89.
- Banska vlast Banovine Hrvatske (1940a). "Seljačka prosvjeta". Godišnjak banske vlasti Banovine Hrvatske (in Croatian). Vol. 1. pp. 42–49.

==== Genealogy ====
- Nosić, Milan (2013). Goranska prezimena. ISBN 9789537029319.
- Barac-Grum, Vida (1987-06-28). "Pogled na gorskokotarsku povijesnu antroponimiju" [A View into the Historical Anthroponymy of Gorski Kotar]. Rasprave Instituta za hrvatski jezik (in Croatian). 13 (1): 5–8. ISSN 1331-6745.
- Korenčić, Mirko (1979). Naselja i stanovništvo Socijalističke Republike Hrvatske (1857–1971). Djela Jugoslavenske akademije znanosti i umjetnosti. Vol. 54.

=== Hydrology ===
- Klasanović, Tea (2024-09-16) [defended 2024-09-19]. Kvaliteta pitkih voda i voda u prirodi na području Gorskoga kotara (Thesis). Rijeka: Medicinski fakultet Sveučilišta u Rijeci.

=== Tourism ===
- Rajnović, Sara (2023-11-06) [defended 2023-10-31]. Turistička valorizacija prostornih resursa Gorskog kotara [Tourism valorization of spatial resources of Gorski kotar] (Thesis) (in Serbo-Croatian). Zadar: Sveučilište u Zadru.
- Košeto, Gloria (2023-09-19). Stavovi lokalnog stanovništva o ponudi turističkih događanja na području Gorskog kotara [Local residents’ views on the offer of tourist events in the area of Gorski kotar] (Thesis) (in Serbo-Croatian). Rijeka: Sveučilište u Rijeci.
- Frković, Ana (2023-09-11) [defended 2023-09-19]. Značaj i uloga ruralnog turizma u revitalizaciji Gorskog kotara [The significance and role of rural tourism in the revitalization of Gorski kotar] (Thesis) (in Serbo-Croatian). Rijeka: Sveučilište u Rijeci.
- Časni, Maja (2022-05-27) [defended 2022-04-20]. Stanje i mogućnosti turističkog razvoja grada Vrbovsko [Condition and possibilities of tourist development of the town of Vrbovsko] (Thesis) (in Serbo-Croatian). Karlovac: Veleučilište u Karlovcu.
- Kušić, Tatjana (December 2017). "Izvještaj o radu Turističke zajednice Grada Vrbovskog i direktorice ureda TZ Vrbovskog: siječanj-prosinac 2017" (PDF). Visit Vrbovsko. Archived from the original (PDF) on 2021-10-26.
- Kušić, Tatjana (2016-12-05). "Izvještaj o radu Turističke zajednice Grada Vrbovskog i direktorice ureda TZ Vrbovskog: siječanj-prosinac 2016" (PDF). Visit Vrbovsko. Archived from the original (PDF) on 2021-10-27.
- Kušić, Tatjana (2015-12-11). "Izvještaj o radu TZ Grada Vrbovskog i direktorice ureda TZ Vrbovskog: siječanj-prosinac 2016" (PDF). Visit Vrbovsko. Archived from the original (PDF) on 2021-10-27.
- Turistička zajednica Grada Vrbovskog (2014-07-24). Dobrodošli u Vrbovsko. Tirage: 2000.
