= Jablan =

Jablan may refer to:

== People ==
- Slavik Vlado Jablan, a Serbian mathematician and crystallographer

== Settlements ==
- Jablan, Slovenia, a village near Mirna Peč, Slovenia
- Jablan, Croatia, a village near Vrbovsko, Croatia
- Jablan, Klisa, a field near Klisa, Osijek-Baranja County
- Jablan (Donji Vakuf), a village in Bosnia and Herzegovina

== Mountains ==
- Jablan mountain (Jablan), a mountain above Jablan, Croatia
- Jablan mountain (Vrgorac), a mountain in Vrgorac, Croatia

== Hydrology ==
- Jablan (Menjača), a tributary of the Miljašić Jaruga near Nin, Croatia
- Jablan (Roženica), a tributary of the Kupa
- Jablan spring (Krvavica), a spring on Biokovo above Krvavica, Croatia
- Jablan spring (Radusini), a spring below Radusinov Vrh in Grab, Zadar County
