= Presika, Primorje-Gorski Kotar County =

Coordinates: 45°24′N 15°04′E

Presika Preseka
- Village
- Interactive map of Presika
- Country: Croatia
- County: Primorje-Gorski Kotar County
- Municipality: Vrbovsko
- Community: Vrbovsko

Area
  - Total: 4.2 km^{2} (1.6 sq mi)

Population (2021)
  - Total: 12
  - Density: 2.9/km^{2} (7.4/sq mi)
- Time zone: UTC+1 (CET)
  - Summer (DST): UTC+2 (CEST)

Presika is a village in Croatia. It is connected by the D3 highway.

== History ==
In 1860–1879, Matija Mažuranić wrote a 62 folio manuscript today titled Writings on the Building of Roads in Gorski Kotar and Lika (Croatian: Spisi o gradnji cesta u Gorskom Kotaru i Lici), today with signature HR-ZaNSK R 6424. A 21 folio manuscript dated 1872 titled Darstellung der Entstehung des Baues ... der Luisenstrasse togethr with a translation by I. Mikloušić is kept as HR-ZaNSK R 4572.

=== WWII ===
On 29 May 1941, the Ustaše arrested 20 Serb and 7 Croat villagers from Jablan, Hajdine, Presika, Stubica and Tuk. All were imprisoned for 8 to 30 days and then release, only to be recaptured shortly after release. Only Ivan Štiglić, Zvonko Matijević and Jovo Stipanović survived.

=== Recent ===
Presika was hit by the 2014 Dinaric ice storm.

On 12 December 2017, a severe wind hit Presika, blocking traffic to and from it.

On 27 March 2021, a magnitude 2.1 earthquake occurred between Presika, Nadvučnik and Međedi.

In June 2018, the Lovnik water storage unit was found to have a coliform bacteria concentration of 391/100ml, and both Escherichia coli and Enterococcus bacteria were present.

== Demographics ==
As of 2021, the only inhabitants under the age of 20 was a single teenage boy.

In 1870, Preseka had 13 houses and 92 people.

In 1890, Presika (Moravice) had 9 houses and 48 people, and was considered part of Vučinić Selo. They attended the school in Dokmanovići. Administered and taxed by Komorske Moravice.

In 1890, Presika (Vrbovsko) consisted of hamlets Presika (10 houses, 74 people), Jelenski Jarak (1 house, 11 people) and Prokop (4 houses, 18 people). Its villagers were under Komorske Moravice Orthodox and Vrbovsko Catholic parishes, and Vrbovsko school, tax and administrative districts.

Village of Presika: Population trends 1857–2021
v

population	72	92	105	103	84	88	75	90	70	78	72	50	35	29	18	14	12
	1857	1869	1880	1890	1900	1910	1921	1931	1948	1953	1961	1971	1981	1991	2001	2011	2021

Note:Od 1910. do 1970. iskazivano pod imenom Presika Vrbovska. Sources: Croatian Bureau of Statistics publications

=== Further reading ===
- Kraljevski zemaljski statistički ured (1903). Političko i sudbeno razdieljenje i Repertorij prebivališta Kraljevina Hrvatske i Slavonije po stanju od 1. travnja 1903. Zagreb: Kraljevska hrvatsko-slavonsko-dalmatinska zemaljska vlada, 🖶 Kraljevska zemaljska tiskara.
- Kraljevski zemaljski statistički ured (May 1913). "Repertorij prebivališta po županijama, upravnim kotarima, gradovima, upravnim i poreznim općinama". Političko i sudbeno razdjeljenje i Repertorij prebivališta Kraljevina Hrvatske i Slavonije po stanju od 1. siječnja 1913. Zagreb: Kraljevska hrvatsko-slavonsko-dalmatinska zemaljska vlada, 🖶 Kraljevska zemaljska tiskara. pp. 1–126. Pages 32, 33.

== Politics ==
As of its foundation on 3 March 2008, it belongs to the local committee of Vrbovsko.

== Infrastructure ==
The water storage unit Lovnik, with a capacity of 130 cubic metres (4,600 ft^{3}) at an elevation of 610 metres (2,000 ft), is responsible for part of Vrbovsko and for Hajdine, Presika, Kamensko and Stubica.

== Bibliography ==
=== Demography ===
- Korenčić, Mirko (1979). Naselja i stanovništvo Socijalističke Republike Hrvatske (1857–1971) [Villages and Population of the Socialist Republic of Croatia (1857–1971)]. Djela Jugoslavenske akademije znanosti i umjetnosti (in Serbo-Croatian). Vol. 54.

=== Genealogy ===
- Barac-Grum, Vida (1987-06-28). "Pogled na gorskokotarsku povijesnu antroponimiju" [A View into the Historical Anthroponymy of Gorski Kotar]. Rasprave Instituta za hrvatski jezik (in Croatian). 13 (1): 5–8. ISSN 1331-6745.
