= Vujnovići =

Vujnovići Вујновићи (Serbian)
- Village
- Interactive map of Vujnovići
- Location within Croatia
- Coordinates: 45.37072°N 15.062499°E
- Country: Croatia
- County: Primorje-Gorski Kotar County
- City: Vrbovsko
- Community: Vrbovsko

Area
  - Total: 27.6 km^{2} (10.7 sq mi)
- Elevation: 464 m (1,522 ft)

Population (2021)
  - Total: 32
  - Density: 1.2/km^{2} (3.0/sq mi)
- Time zone: UTC+1 (CET)
  - Summer (DST): UTC+2 (CEST)
- Postal code: 51326
- Area code: +385 051

Vujnovići is a village in Croatia, under the Vrbovsko township, in Primorje-Gorski Kotar County. The Kamačnik canyon and Kamačnik Bridge over it are both within the territory of Vujnovići.

== History ==
=== WWII ===
Towards the end of WWII, after the success of a certain Partisan offensive, Vrbovsko postal telephone operator Anka Paviša, wife of Matija Paviša, overheard a conversation of some of the "occupiers" indicating they planned to exact revenge for that success on the Serb inhabitants of Vujnovići. According to Mladen Marušić, Anka was able to warn them of this beforehand and no one perished. After the war, Anka was made post office manager.

=== Recent ===
Vujnovići was hit by the 2014 Dinaric ice storm.

== Demographics ==
As of 2021, there were no inhabitants under the age of 25.

In 1890, Vujnović Selo had 25 houses and 203 people. They attended the school in Vrbovsko regardless of faith. Despite being taxed by Vrbovsko, Vujnović Selo was administered by Gomirje.

Village of Vujnovići: Population trends 1857–2021
v

population	432	528	255	247	247	190	152	161	72	81	100	92	86	83	54	41	32
	1857	1869	1880	1890	1900	1910	1921	1931	1948	1953	1961	1971	1981	1991	2001	2011	2021

Note:Iskazuje se kao naselje od 1880. Iskazano pod imenom Vujnović Selo u 1880. i 1890., Vojnović Selo u 1900. i Vujnovići od 1910. nadalje. Sadrži podatke za bivša naselja Stubica Gomirska od 1880. do 1931. i Vrbovsko Gomirsko u 1857. i 1869. U 1857. i 1869. sadrži podatke i za naselja Hambarište i Tuk. Od 2001. smanjeno za dio područja naselja koji je pripojen naselju Vrbovsko, za koji sadrži dio podataka od 1857. do 1991. Sources: Croatian Bureau of Statistics publications

=== Further reading ===
- Kraljevski zemaljski statistički ured (1903). Političko i sudbeno razdieljenje i Repertorij prebivališta Kraljevina Hrvatske i Slavonije po stanju od 1. travnja 1903. Zagreb: Kraljevska hrvatsko-slavonsko-dalmatinska zemaljska vlada, 🖶 Kraljevska zemaljska tiskara.
- Kraljevski zemaljski statistički ured (May 1913). "Repertorij prebivališta po županijama, upravnim kotarima, gradovima, upravnim i poreznim općinama". Političko i sudbeno razdjeljenje i Repertorij prebivališta Kraljevina Hrvatske i Slavonije po stanju od 1. siječnja 1913. Zagreb: Kraljevska hrvatsko-slavonsko-dalmatinska zemaljska vlada, 🖶 Kraljevska zemaljska tiskara. pp. 1–126. Page 22.

== Politics ==
As of its foundation on 3 March 2008, it belongs to the local committee of Vrbovsko.

== Attractions ==
Kamačnik canyon is on the territory of Vujnovići.

== Infrastructure ==
The water storage unit Kratofil is responsible for Vujnovići and part of Vrbovsko.

== Bibliography ==
- Korenčić, Mirko (1979). Naselja i stanovništvo Socijalističke Republike Hrvatske (1857–1971) [Villages and Population of the Socialist Republic of Croatia (1857–1971)]. Djela Jugoslavenske akademije znanosti i umjetnosti (in Serbo-Croatian). Vol. 54.
