= Hajdine =

Coordinates: 45°23′16″N 15°05′09″E

Hajdine Хајдине (Serbian) Hajdini
- Village
- Interactive map of Hajdine
- Country: Croatia
- County: Primorje-Gorski Kotar County
- Municipality: Vrbovsko
- Community: Vrbovsko

Area
  - Total: 3.0 km^{2} (1.2 sq mi)
- Elevation: 575 m (1,886 ft)

Population (2021)
  - Total: 51
  - Density: 17/km^{2} (44/sq mi)
- Time zone: UTC+1 (CET)
  - Summer (DST): UTC+2 (CEST)

Hajdine (Serbian Cyrillic: Хајдине) is a village in Croatia. It is connected by the D3 highway.

== History ==
In 1860–1879, Matija Mažuranić wrote a 62 folio manuscript today titled Writings on the Building of Roads in Gorski Kotar and Lika (Croatian: Spisi o gradnji cesta u Gorskom Kotaru i Lici), today with signature HR-ZaNSK R 6424. A 21 folio manuscript dated 1872 titled Darstellung der Entstehung des Baues ... der Luisenstrasse togethr with a translation by I. Mikloušić is kept as HR-ZaNSK R 4572.

In 1864, a rinderpest outbreak in Bosanci and Kasuni caused the Lujzijana to be closed to horned traffic for 21 days in December.

=== WWII ===
On 29 May 1941, the Ustaše arrested 20 Serb and 7 Croat villagers from Jablan, Hajdine, Presika, Stubica and Tuk. All were imprisoned for 8 to 30 days and then released, only to be recaptured shortly after release. Only Ivan Štiglić, Zvonko Matijević and Jovo Stipanović survived.

=== Recent ===
There was a water supply problem in Hajdine in February 2012.

On 27 July 2013, there was a road accident between a motorcyclist and a vehicle at around 14:45, with the motorcyclist receiving minor injuries.

Hajdine was hit by the 2014 Dinaric ice storm.

On 12 December 2017, a severe wind hit Hajdine, blocking traffic to and from it.

In June 2018, the Lovnik water storage unit was found to have a coliform bacteria concentration of 391/100ml, and both Escherichia coli and Enterococcus bacteria were present.

== Demographics ==
As of 2021, the only inhabitant under the age of 20 was a single boy.

In 1870, Hajdini had 27 houses and 196 people. Unlike the other villages in Vrbovsko, whose residents were Catholic, Hajdini was Eastern Orthodox and belonged to the parish of Komorske Moravice.

In 1890, Hajdinska Draga itself had 24 houses and 172 people. Beuki had 2 houses and 13 people. Košarine had 1 house and 8 people. Its villagers were under Komorske Moravice Orthodox and Vrbovsko Catholic parishes, and Vrbovsko school, tax and administrative districts.

Village of Hajdine: Population trends 1857–2021
v

population	226	196	225	204	173	182	126	159	137	138	148	138	118	115	102	80	51
	1857	1869	1880	1890	1900	1910	1921	1931	1948	1953	1961	1971	1981	1991	2001	2011	2021

Note:Iskazivano pod imenom Hajdini od 1857. do 1900., Gornji Hajdini od 1910. do 1948. i opet Hajdini u 1953. te Hajdine od 1961. nadalje. Sources: Croatian Bureau of Statistics publications

=== Further reading ===
- Kraljevski zemaljski statistički ured (1903). Političko i sudbeno razdieljenje i Repertorij prebivališta Kraljevina Hrvatske i Slavonije po stanju od 1. travnja 1903. Zagreb: Kraljevska hrvatsko-slavonsko-dalmatinska zemaljska vlada, 🖶 Kraljevska zemaljska tiskara.
- Kraljevski zemaljski statistički ured (May 1913). "Repertorij prebivališta po županijama, upravnim kotarima, gradovima, upravnim i poreznim općinama". Političko i sudbeno razdjeljenje i Repertorij prebivališta Kraljevina Hrvatske i Slavonije po stanju od 1. siječnja 1913. Zagreb: Kraljevska hrvatsko-slavonsko-dalmatinska zemaljska vlada, 🖶 Kraljevska zemaljska tiskara. pp. 1–126. Page 33.

== Politics ==
As of its foundation on 3 March 2008, it belongs to the local committee of Vrbovsko.

== Infrastructure ==
The water storage unit Lovnik, with a capacity of 130 cubic metres (4,600 ft^{3}) at an elevation of 610 metres (2,000 ft), is responsible for part of Vrbovsko and for Hajdine, Presika, Kamensko and Stubica.

== Bibliography ==
- Korenčić, Mirko (1979). Naselja i stanovništvo Socijalističke Republike Hrvatske (1857–1971) [Villages and Population of the Socialist Republic of Croatia (1857–1971)]. Djela Jugoslavenske akademije znanosti i umjetnosti (in Serbo-Croatian). Vol. 54.
