= Jablan, Croatia =

Jablan
- Village
- Interactive map of Jablan
- Location within Croatia
- Coordinates: 45.377895°N 15.028253°E
- Country: Croatia
- County: Primorje-Gorski Kotar County
- City: Vrbovsko
- Community: Vrbovsko

Area
  - Total: 18.8 km^{2} (7.3 sq mi)
- Elevation: 683 m (2,241 ft)

Population (2021)
  - Total: 177
  - Density: 9.41/km^{2} (24.4/sq mi)
- Time zone: UTC+1 (CET)
  - Summer (DST): UTC+2 (CEST)
- Postal code: 51326
- Area code: +385 051

Jablan is a village in Croatia, under the Vrbovsko township, in Primorje-Gorski Kotar County.

== Name ==
Jablan is also the name of a village on the Temenica and a village on the Semešnica. The root forms a component of the name of many settlements, including Jablanac near Senj, Jablanac Jasenovački on the Una and Sava, and Jablanovec near Zagreb. Specifically Jablan is also the name of:

- Fields: a field near Klisa
- Mountains: a mountain above Jablan itself, a mountain near Biokovo
- Roads: a street in Betina, several eponymous streets in villages named Jablan
- Streams: a tributary of the Kupa, a tributary of the Miljašić Jaruga
- Springs: a spring above Krvavica, a spring in Radusini (Grab)

== History ==
On 29 May 1941, the Ustaše arrested 20 Serb and 7 Croat villagers from Jablan, Hajdine, Presika, Stubica and Tuk. All were imprisoned for 8 to 30 days and then released, only to be recaptured shortly after release. Only Ivan Štiglić, Zvonko Matijević and Jovo Stipanović survived.

The volunteer fire department DVD Jablan was founded on 31 December 1952, and is today part of the VZ grada Vrbovsko. Its current commander is Sanjin Mamula.

Jablan was hit by the 2014 Dinaric ice storm.

In 2023, the old road in Jablan and its connection with the županijska cesta were asphalted.

== Demographics ==
As of 2021, there were only 15 inhabitants under the age of 20.

Village of Jablan: Population trends 1857–2021
v

population	470	570	498	405	436	384	331	381	301	302	310	271	208	230	223	209	177
	1857	1869	1880	1890	1900	1910	1921	1931	1948	1953	1961	1971	1981	1991	2001	2011	2021

Sources: Croatian Bureau of Statistics publications

In 1870, Jablan had 63 houses and 570 people.

In 1890, Jablan itself had 29 houses and 161 people. Stara Cesta had 25 houses and 170 people. Lisina had 11 houses and 74 people. Its villagers were under Komorske Moravice Orthodox and Vrbovsko Catholic parishes, and Vrbovsko tax and administrative districts but Senjsko school district.

=== Further reading ===
- Kraljevski zemaljski statistički ured (1903). Političko i sudbeno razdieljenje i Repertorij prebivališta Kraljevina Hrvatske i Slavonije po stanju od 1. travnja 1903. Zagreb: Kraljevska hrvatsko-slavonsko-dalmatinska zemaljska vlada, 🖶 Kraljevska zemaljska tiskara.
- Kraljevski zemaljski statistički ured (May 1913). "Repertorij prebivališta po županijama, upravnim kotarima, gradovima, upravnim i poreznim općinama". Političko i sudbeno razdjeljenje i Repertorij prebivališta Kraljevina Hrvatske i Slavonije po stanju od 1. siječnja 1913. Zagreb: Kraljevska hrvatsko-slavonsko-dalmatinska zemaljska vlada, 🖶 Kraljevska zemaljska tiskara. pp. 1–126. Page 33.

== Governance ==
=== Local ===
As of its foundation on 3 March 2008, it belonged to the local committee of Vrbovsko. But now it has its own local committee.

Presidents of local committee:

- Dalibor Šišul (2013)
- Boris Gudac (2017) Independent
- Slaven Kusturin (2021), HDZ

== Infrastructure ==
The water storage unit in Lisina, with a capacity of 40 cubic metres (1,400 ft^{3}) at an elevation of 763.4 metres (2,505 ft), is also responsible for Jablan. The units Bijela Kosa 1 and Bijela Kosa 2 is responsible for part of Lisina, Jablan and Senjsko. The water pumping station Bijela Kosa affects the water storage units Bijela Kosa 1 and Bijela Kosa 2.

Jablan is at a significantly higher elevation than Vrbovsko, which administers it, and receives more and more frequent snow cover. Complaints sometimes arise over the infrequency of road clearing in the winter.

== Bibliography ==
- Korenčić, Mirko (1979). Naselja i stanovništvo Socijalističke Republike Hrvatske (1857–1971) [Villages and Population of the Socialist Republic of Croatia (1857–1971)]. Djela Jugoslavenske akademije znanosti i umjetnosti (in Serbo-Croatian). Vol. 54.
