= Musulini =

Musulini Мусулини (Serbian)
- Village
- Interactive map of Musulini
- Location within Croatia
- Coordinates: 45.337577°N 15.096753°E
- Country: Croatia
- County: Primorje-Gorski Kotar County
- City: Vrbovsko
- Community: Gomirje

Area
  - Total: 19 km^{2} (7.3 sq mi)
- Elevation: 455 m (1,493 ft)

Population (2021)
  - Total: 112
  - Density: 5.9/km^{2} (15/sq mi)
- Time zone: UTC+1 (CET)
  - Summer (DST): UTC+2 (CEST)
- Postal code: 51326
- Area code: +385 051

Musulini is a village in Croatia, under the Vrbovsko township, in Primorje-Gorski Kotar County.

== History ==
On 1 July 1942, the Chetniks of Musulini and Gomirje accompanied the Italian army on an anti-Partisan campaign in Musulinski Potok. 2 Chetniks were wounded and a number of Partisans were killed and wounded. The Chetniks captured a machine gun and 20 military rifles. Then on the 6th, the Partisans carried out an attack on Gomirje and Musulini, which the Chetniks repelled.

On 14 July 1942, 2 airplanes bombed Tatalovići, at the time in Partisan control.

Musulini was hit by the 2014 Dinaric ice storm.

== Demographics ==
As of 2021, there were only 9 inhabitants under the age of 20.

In 1890, Musulinski Kraj had 29 houses and 202 people. They attended the school in Gomirje. Administered and taxed by Gomirje.

Village of Musulini: Population trends 1857–2021
v

population			262	603	486	494	443	504	407	424	366	320	256	207	174	152	112
	1857	1869	1880	1890	1900	1910	1921	1931	1948	1953	1961	1971	1981	1991	2001	2011	2021

Note:Do 1890. iskazivano pod imenom Musulinski Kraj. U 1857. i 1869. podaci su sadržani u naselju Gomirje, kao i dio podataka u 1880. Sadrži podatke za bivše naselje Kosanovići koje je od 1890. do 1948. iskazivano kao naselje. Sources: Croatian Bureau of Statistics publications

=== Further reading ===
- Kraljevski zemaljski statistički ured (1903). Političko i sudbeno razdieljenje i Repertorij prebivališta Kraljevina Hrvatske i Slavonije po stanju od 1. travnja 1903. Zagreb: Kraljevska hrvatsko-slavonsko-dalmatinska zemaljska vlada, 🖶 Kraljevska zemaljska tiskara.
- Kraljevski zemaljski statistički ured (May 1913). "Repertorij prebivališta po županijama, upravnim kotarima, gradovima, upravnim i poreznim općinama". Političko i sudbeno razdjeljenje i Repertorij prebivališta Kraljevina Hrvatske i Slavonije po stanju od 1. siječnja 1913. Zagreb: Kraljevska hrvatsko-slavonsko-dalmatinska zemaljska vlada, 🖶 Kraljevska zemaljska tiskara. pp. 1–126. Page 22.

== Politics ==
As of its foundation on 3 March 2008, it belongs to the local committee of Gomirje.

== Sports ==
The "Gorski Kotar Bike Tour", held annually since 2012, sometimes goes through Kosanovići, such as in the third leg for 2022.

== Bibliography ==
- Korenčić, Mirko (1979). Naselja i stanovništvo Socijalističke Republike Hrvatske (1857–1971) [Villages and Population of the Socialist Republic of Croatia (1857–1971)]. Djela Jugoslavenske akademije znanosti i umjetnosti (in Serbo-Croatian). Vol. 54.
- Trgo, Fabijan, ed. (1964). Zbornik dokumenata i podataka o Narodno-oslobodilačkom ratu Jugoslovenskih naroda. Vol. V, 32.
