= Majer, Croatia =

Majer
- Village
- Interactive map of Majer
- Location within Croatia
- Coordinates: 45.32826°N 15.12489°E
- Country: Croatia
- County: Primorje-Gorski Kotar County
- City: Vrbovsko
- Community: Gomirje

Area
  - Total: 0.5 km^{2} (0.19 sq mi)
- Elevation: 388 m (1,273 ft)

Population (2021)
  - Total: 9
  - Density: 18/km^{2} (47/sq mi)
- Time zone: UTC+1 (CET)
  - Summer (DST): UTC+2 (CEST)
- Postal code: 51326
- Area code: +385 051

Majer is a village in Croatia, under the Vrbovsko township, in Primorje-Gorski Kotar County.

== History ==
Majer was hit by the 2014 Dinaric ice storm.

In 2023, the road entering Majer was asphalted.

== Demographics ==
As of 2021, the only inhabitant under the age of 20 was a single teenage girl.

In 1890, Majer had 8 houses and 51 people. They attended the school in Gomirje. Administered and taxed by Gomirje.

Village of Majer: Population trends 1857–2021
v

population				51	51	41	35	46	43	39	39	31			21	16	9
	1857	1869	1880	1890	1900	1910	1921	1931	1948	1953	1961	1971	1981	1991	2001	2011	2021

Note:Under Gomirje from 1857 to 1880 and from 1981 to 1991. Sources: Croatian Bureau of Statistics publications

=== Further reading ===
- Kraljevski zemaljski statistički ured (1903). Političko i sudbeno razdieljenje i Repertorij prebivališta Kraljevina Hrvatske i Slavonije po stanju od 1. travnja 1903. Zagreb: Kraljevska hrvatsko-slavonsko-dalmatinska zemaljska vlada, 🖶 Kraljevska zemaljska tiskara.
- Kraljevski zemaljski statistički ured (May 1913). "Repertorij prebivališta po županijama, upravnim kotarima, gradovima, upravnim i poreznim općinama". Političko i sudbeno razdjeljenje i Repertorij prebivališta Kraljevina Hrvatske i Slavonije po stanju od 1. siječnja 1913. Zagreb: Kraljevska hrvatsko-slavonsko-dalmatinska zemaljska vlada, 🖶 Kraljevska zemaljska tiskara. pp. 1–126. Page 22.

== Politics ==
As of its foundation on 3 March 2008, it belongs to the local committee of Gomirje.

== Bibliography ==
- Korenčić, Mirko (1979). Naselja i stanovništvo Socijalističke Republike Hrvatske (1857–1971) [Villages and Population of the Socialist Republic of Croatia (1857–1971)]. Djela Jugoslavenske akademije znanosti i umjetnosti (in Serbo-Croatian). Vol. 54.
