= Kamensko, Primorje-Gorski Kotar County =

Kamensko
- Village
- Interactive map of Kamensko
- Location within Croatia
- Coordinates: 45.362157°N 15.165925°E
- Country: Croatia
- County: Primorje-Gorski Kotar County
- City: Vrbovsko
- Community: Gomirje

Area
  - Total: 4.6 km^{2} (1.8 sq mi)
- Elevation: 433 m (1,421 ft)

Population (2021)
  - Total: 0
  - Density: 0.0/km^{2} (0.0/sq mi)
- Time zone: UTC+1 (CET)
  - Summer (DST): UTC+2 (CEST)
- Postal code: 51326
- Area code: +385 051

Kamensko is a village in Croatia, under the Vrbovsko township, in Primorje-Gorski Kotar County.

== History ==
When the Vlachs of Gomirje requested a confirmation of their Uskok rights throughout the territory they inhabited in 1605, they listed its boundaries as stretching from Mali Klek – Ustanke (the confluence of the Vitunjčica and the Dobra) – Vrbica – Kamensko – Vrbovsko – Plešivica – Mošenski – Bilek – "Potschovodo" – Topolovica – Okrugljik – Radigojna – Gornji Lazi.

=== WWII ===
The Hasan family of Kamensko (Franjo, Danica, Mate, Tonica, Dragica, Vidica, Leonka) was listed by SUBNOR as a victim of fascism.

=== Recent ===
In 2010, an unknown person illegally cut down 212 trees of Quercus cerris, Carpinus betulus and Fagus sylvatica in Kamensko.

Kamensko was hit by the 2014 Dinaric ice storm.

In June 2018, the Lovnik water storage unit was found to have a coliform bacteria concentration of 391/100ml, and both Escherichia coli and Enterococcus bacteria were present.

== Demographics ==
As of 2021, Kamensko had no permanent inhabitants.

Village of Kamensko: Population trends 1857–2021
v

population				60	58				86	80	62	55	20	16	13	4
	1857	1869	1880	1890	1900	1910	1921	1931	1948	1953	1961	1971	1981	1991	2001	2011	2021

Note:Recorded as a dio naselja from 1890. Under Ponikve from 1910 to 1931. Separated from Gomirje in 2001. Sources: Croatian Bureau of Statistics publications

In 1870, Kamensko had 7 houses and 50 people.

In 1890, Kamensko (Vrbovsko) had 10 houses and 60 people. Its villagers were under Komorske Moravice Orthodox and Vrbovsko Catholic parishes, and Vrbovsko school, tax and administrative districts.

In 1890, Kamensko (Osojnik) had 1 house and 4 people. The villagers of Kamensko were under Lukovdol parish. They attended the school in Lukovdol but were administered by Severin and taxed by Osojnik.

=== Further reading ===
- Kraljevski zemaljski statistički ured (1903). Političko i sudbeno razdieljenje i Repertorij prebivališta Kraljevina Hrvatske i Slavonije po stanju od 1. travnja 1903. Zagreb: Kraljevska hrvatsko-slavonsko-dalmatinska zemaljska vlada, 🖶 Kraljevska zemaljska tiskara.
- Kraljevski zemaljski statistički ured (May 1913). "Repertorij prebivališta po županijama, upravnim kotarima, gradovima, upravnim i poreznim općinama". Političko i sudbeno razdjeljenje i Repertorij prebivališta Kraljevina Hrvatske i Slavonije po stanju od 1. siječnja 1913. Zagreb: Kraljevska hrvatsko-slavonsko-dalmatinska zemaljska vlada, 🖶 Kraljevska zemaljska tiskara. pp. 1–126. Page 33.

== Politics ==
As of its foundation on 3 March 2008, it belongs to the local committee of Gomirje.

== Infrastructure ==
The water storage unit Lovnik, with a capacity of 130 cubic metres (4,600 ft^{3}) at an elevation of 610 metres (2,000 ft), is responsible for part of Vrbovsko and for Hajdine, Presika, Kamensko and Stubica.

== Bibliography ==
- Korenčić, Mirko (1979). Naselja i stanovništvo Socijalističke Republike Hrvatske (1857–1971) [Villages and Population of the Socialist Republic of Croatia (1857–1971)]. Djela Jugoslavenske akademije znanosti i umjetnosti (in Serbo-Croatian). Vol. 54.
