= Ljubošina =

Ljubošina Љубошина (Serbian)
- Village
- Interactive map of Ljubošina
- Location within Croatia
- Coordinates: 45.321435°N 15.156827°E
- Country: Croatia
- County: Primorje-Gorski Kotar County
- City: Vrbovsko

Area
  - Total: 19.2 km^{2} (7.4 sq mi)
- Elevation: 430 m (1,410 ft)

Population (2021)
  - Total: 126
  - Density: 6.56/km^{2} (17.0/sq mi)
- Time zone: UTC+1 (CET)
  - Summer (DST): UTC+2 (CEST)
- Postal code: 51326
- Area code: +385 051

Ljubošina is a village in Croatia, under the Vrbovsko township, in Primorje-Gorski Kotar County.

== Name ==
It was recorded as Liubostina on the 1673 map of Stjepan Glavač.

== History ==
From the Modruše urbarium of 1486 we learn the names of several farms in Ljubošina. Most were under Vitunj, but the empty Jurić farm was under Gojmerje, and for his service it was granted to Ilija Mihelić to hold by Stjepan III Frankopan. Under Vitunj, a certain Jurko (possibly Ivković) had 21 morgens of land, 4 of which meadows, serving corvée in the city of Modruše or 2 ducats; the remaining 2 farms were empty, the 31 morgen Kovač farm, formerly with the same duties but overgrown with čremuš, and the 21 morgen Kleković farm, formerly with the same duties or horse duty. It is not known whether this Kleković family was related to that of Captain Vid Kleković, who fought in the Battle of Budački (1576), the Battle of Klis (1596), and Rabatta's campaign to subdue the Uskoks in 1601.

Ljubošina was hit by the 2014 Dinaric ice storm.

== Demographics ==
As of 2021, there were only 10 inhabitants under the age of 20.

In 1890, Ljubošina consisted of Ljubošina proper (51 houses, 385 people) and Rabatić Poljana (2 houses, 17 people). Kosanović Brdo (15 houses, 121 people) was not yet a statistical part of Ljubošina. Nor was Trnova Poljana (20 houses, 152 people), to which Brezova Poljana (7 houses, 45 people) was subordinated. All attended the school in Gomirje except for Brezova Poljana which attended the school in Vrbovsko.

Village of Ljubošina: Population trends 1857–2021
v

population			616	675	579	510	491	535	421	399	378	368	310	269	205	173	126
	1857	1869	1880	1890	1900	1910	1921	1931	1948	1953	1961	1971	1981	1991	2001	2011	2021

Note:Under Gomirje in 1857 and 1869, and partly in 1880. Includes the population of former villages Carevo Brdo and Trnova Poljana, both independent until 1948. Sources: Croatian Bureau of Statistics publications

=== Further reading ===
- Kraljevski zemaljski statistički ured (1903). Političko i sudbeno razdieljenje i Repertorij prebivališta Kraljevina Hrvatske i Slavonije po stanju od 1. travnja 1903. Zagreb: Kraljevska hrvatsko-slavonsko-dalmatinska zemaljska vlada, 🖶 Kraljevska zemaljska tiskara.
- Kraljevski zemaljski statistički ured (May 1913). "Repertorij prebivališta po županijama, upravnim kotarima, gradovima, upravnim i poreznim općinama". Političko i sudbeno razdjeljenje i Repertorij prebivališta Kraljevina Hrvatske i Slavonije po stanju od 1. siječnja 1913. Zagreb: Kraljevska hrvatsko-slavonsko-dalmatinska zemaljska vlada, 🖶 Kraljevska zemaljska tiskara. pp. 1–126. Page 22.

== Politics ==
As of its foundation on 3 March 2008, it has its own local committee.

Presidents of local committee:

- Darko Stipanović (2008, 2009, 2013)
- Dragan Stipanović (2017, 2021), Independent

== Infrastructure ==
Ljubošina has an Udaljeni pretplatnički multipleksor (UPM).

The water storage unit in Ljubošina, with a capacity of 100 cubic metres (3,500 ft^{3}) at an elevation of 504.89 metres (1,656.5 ft), uses on the Topli potok pumping station at 368.8 metres (1,210 ft), with 3.5 l/s flow. This pipe system was reconstructed and sanitised in 2024.

== Bibliography ==
- Melem Hajdarović, Mihela (2023-06-14). "Glavačeva karta Hrvatske iz 1673. – njezini toponimi, geografski sadržaj i historijskogeografski kontekst" [Glavač’s map of Croatia from 1673: Its toponyms, geographical content, and historical-geographical context]. Studia lexicographica. 17 (32): 47–78. doi:10.33604/sl.17.32.2. eISSN 2459-5578.
