= Tuk, Vrbovsko =

Tuk Тук (Serbian)
- Village
- Interactive map of Tuk
- Location within Croatia
- Coordinates: 45.379101°N 15.103097°E
- Country: Croatia
- County: Primorje-Gorski Kotar County
- City: Vrbovsko
- Community: Vrbovsko

Area
  - Total: 4.3 km^{2} (1.7 sq mi)
- Elevation: 520 m (1,710 ft)

Population (2021)
  - Total: 47
  - Density: 11/km^{2} (28/sq mi)
- Time zone: UTC+1 (CET)
  - Summer (DST): UTC+2 (CEST)
- Postal code: 51326
- Area code: +385 051

Tuk, also known as Tuk Vrbovski or Tuk Gomirski, is a village in Croatia, under the Vrbovsko township, in Primorje-Gorski Kotar County.

== Tuk ==
Tuk was hit by the 2014 Dinaric ice storm.

== Demographics ==
As of 2021, there were only 3 inhabitants under the age of 20.

In 1890, Tuk had 27 houses and 187 people. They attended the school in Vrbovsko despite belonging to Gomirje parish. Despite being taxed by Vrbovsko, Tuk was administered by Gomirje.

Village of Tuk: Population trends 1857–2021
v

population			172	187	147	129	120	113	74	88	90	83	91	94	81	79	47
	1857	1869	1880	1890	1900	1910	1921	1931	1948	1953	1961	1971	1981	1991	2001	2011	2021

Note:"Tuk Vrbovski" in 1880, then "Tuk Gomirski" from 1910 to 1971. In 1857 and 1869 its population was recorded under Vujnovići. In 2001 it was expanded by part of the area of Vrbovsko but part was transferred to Stubica. Sources: Croatian Bureau of Statistics publications

In 1835, Tuk belonged to Ogulin. There were 6 houses, with a population of 49. Its residents were mostly Eastern Orthodox, but 7 were Catholic.

=== Further reading ===
- Kraljevski zemaljski statistički ured (1903). Političko i sudbeno razdieljenje i Repertorij prebivališta Kraljevina Hrvatske i Slavonije po stanju od 1. travnja 1903. Zagreb: Kraljevska hrvatsko-slavonsko-dalmatinska zemaljska vlada, 🖶 Kraljevska zemaljska tiskara.
- Kraljevski zemaljski statistički ured (May 1913). "Repertorij prebivališta po županijama, upravnim kotarima, gradovima, upravnim i poreznim općinama". Političko i sudbeno razdjeljenje i Repertorij prebivališta Kraljevina Hrvatske i Slavonije po stanju od 1. siječnja 1913. Zagreb: Kraljevska hrvatsko-slavonsko-dalmatinska zemaljska vlada, 🖶 Kraljevska zemaljska tiskara. pp. 1–126. Page 22.

== Economy ==
In 2005, an annual pumpkin festival was founded in Vrbovsko by Gani Ramadani, an Albanian from North Macedonia who moved to Tuk but was told pumpkins would not do well in the climate. Ramadani died before the 17th festival, but pumpking growing caught on in Tuk and it is still locally known for its pumpkins.

== Politics ==
As of its foundation on 3 March 2008, it belongs to the local committee of Vrbovsko.

== History ==
On 29 May 1941, the Ustaše arrested 20 Serb and 7 Croat villagers from Jablan, Hajdine, Presika, Stubica and Tuk. All were imprisoned for 8 to 30 days and then released, only to be recaptured shortly after release. Only Ivan Štiglić, Zvonko Matijević and Jovo Stipanović survived.

In October 2006, a pack of wolves killed 6 sheep and 6 lambs belonging to Nikola Vujnović in Tuk. 6 months later, three wolves killed 10 and wounded 3.

== Bibliography ==
- Korenčić, Mirko (1979). Naselja i stanovništvo Socijalističke Republike Hrvatske (1857–1971) [Villages and Population of the Socialist Republic of Croatia (1857–1971)]. Djela Jugoslavenske akademije znanosti i umjetnosti (in Serbo-Croatian). Vol. 54.
