= Hambarište =

Hambarište Хамбариште (Serbian)
- Village
- Interactive map of Hambarište
- Location within Croatia
- Coordinates: 45.36469°N 15.091596°E
- Country: Croatia
- County: Primorje-Gorski Kotar County
- City: Vrbovsko
- Community: Vrbovsko

Area
  - Total: 1.3 km^{2} (0.50 sq mi)
- Elevation: 457 m (1,499 ft)

Population (2021)
  - Total: 34
  - Density: 26/km^{2} (68/sq mi)
- Time zone: UTC+1 (CET)
  - Summer (DST): UTC+2 (CEST)
- Postal code: 51326
- Area code: +385 051

Hambarište is a village in Croatia, under the Vrbovsko township, in Primorje-Gorski Kotar County. It is near a crag, its main source of tourism.

== Geography ==
There is a cliff (45.361°N 15.1063°E) near Hambarište, in the hamlet of Luke, above the rock quarry, with over 50 sport climbing routes set up by the Sportski penjački klub Ogulin in and around 2016: 6 of Fontainebleau difficulty 5, 19 of difficulty 6, 12 of difficulty 7, 2 of difficulty 8a, and 3 ungraded.

== History ==
During a riot on 28 August 1883, a search for the "Hungarian Crest" that had been stolen from the obćinski ured in Gomirje led the rioters as far as Hambarište, but it was never found.

In early 2000, the rock quarry Grič-Hambarište was opened by Viadukt, in a political process over which the city of Vrbovsko had no say. The quarrying lasted until 2007, with little legal activity after that.

In 2005, the construction of a 5 storey building with 50 rooms intended to become a hotel begun in Hambarište, which left the owner 3 million Croatian kuna in debt.

In 2010, a 19 year old from Lukovdol stole 20 metres (66 ft) of copper wire from the transformer station in Hambarište.

Hambarište was hit by the 2014 Dinaric ice storm. From 31 January to 2 February 2014, while S and SW geostrophic wind dominated, freezing rain fell on Gorski Kotar, glazing the entire region. It wrecked roofs, power lines an forests, causing power loss for about 14,000 households in Gorski Kotar, or about 80% of its population. Because of power lines falling on the A6, the highway was closed in of Rijeka between Bosiljevo and Kikovica, and between Kikovica and Delnice in the direction of Zagreb. It took about 10 days to restore essential infrastructure to the region, and within months electricity was back in most of its former range, but at a cost of about 84.4 million HRK to HEP. At the time it was the largest peacetime damage since its Secession from Yugoslavia, even without counting the forestry losses. Clearing blocked forestry roads and forest paths would take years, and thanks to the declining population some were never cleared.

In 2016, the Hambarište bridge in Luke hamlet was rebuilt.

In June 2018, the Hambarište water storage unit was found to have a coliform bacteria concentration of 570/100ml, and both Escherichia coli and Enterococcus bacteria were present.

On 11 June 2019, hail up to 12 centimetres (4.7 in) in diameter fell in Brod Moravice, while large hail fell in other areas. Traffic was reduced to one lane at the Rožman brdo tunnel in Hambarište.

On 20 June 2021, a fire engulfed the trash dump at Hambarište. The same dump was inspected in 2024 in connection to this.

== Demographics ==
As of 2021, there were only 10 inhabitants under the age of 20.

In 1890, Hambarište had 27 houses and 160 people. They attended the school in Vrbovsko regardless of faith. Despite being taxed by Vrbovsko, Vujnović Selo was administered by Gomirje.

Village of Hambarište: Population trends 1857–2021
v

population			165	224	190	149	115	129	80	105	106	100	79	131	54	38	34
	1857	1869	1880	1890	1900	1910	1921	1931	1948	1953	1961	1971	1981	1991	2001	2011	2021

Note:Under Vujnovići in 1857 and 1869. Decreased by the part of its territory attached to Vrbovsko in 2001. Sources: Croatian Bureau of Statistics publications

=== Further reading ===
- Kraljevski zemaljski statistički ured (1903). Političko i sudbeno razdieljenje i Repertorij prebivališta Kraljevina Hrvatske i Slavonije po stanju od 1. travnja 1903. Zagreb: Kraljevska hrvatsko-slavonsko-dalmatinska zemaljska vlada, 🖶 Kraljevska zemaljska tiskara.
- Kraljevski zemaljski statistički ured (May 1913). "Repertorij prebivališta po županijama, upravnim kotarima, gradovima, upravnim i poreznim općinama". Političko i sudbeno razdjeljenje i Repertorij prebivališta Kraljevina Hrvatske i Slavonije po stanju od 1. siječnja 1913. Zagreb: Kraljevska hrvatsko-slavonsko-dalmatinska zemaljska vlada, 🖶 Kraljevska zemaljska tiskara. pp. 1–126. Page 22.

== Politics ==
As of its foundation on 3 March 2008, it belongs to the local committee of Vrbovsko.

== Infrastructure ==
The water storage unit Sv. Ilija, with a capacity of 500 cubic metres (18,000 ft^{3}) at an elevation of 515 metres (1,690 ft), is responsible for part of Vrbovsko, Hambarište and Smreka

== Gallery ==
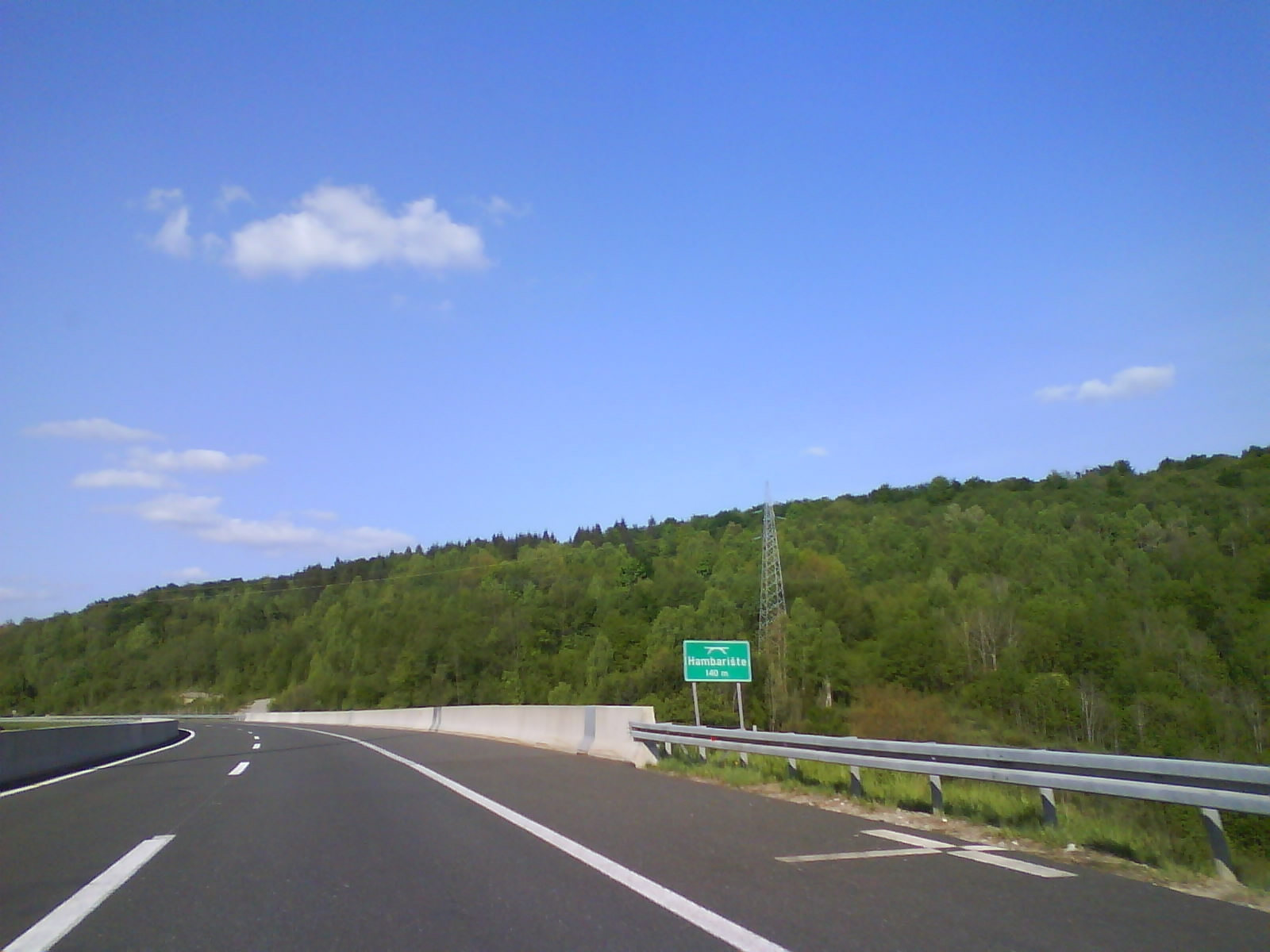
The viaduct of Hambarište.

== Bibliography ==
- Gungula (1883-09-05) [written 1883-08-30]. "U Gomirju (Dopis)". Narodne novine (in Serbo-Croatian). Vol. 49, no. 203. p. 4.
- Barac-Grum, Vida (1987-06-28). "Pogled na gorskokotarsku povijesnu antroponimiju" [A View into the Historical Anthroponymy of Gorski Kotar]. Rasprave Instituta za hrvatski jezik (in Croatian). 13 (1): 5–8. ISSN 1331-6745.
- Korenčić, Mirko (1979). Naselja i stanovništvo Socijalističke Republike Hrvatske (1857–1971) [Villages and Population of the Socialist Republic of Croatia (1857–1971)]. Djela Jugoslavenske akademije znanosti i umjetnosti (in Serbo-Croatian). Vol. 54.
