= Stubica, Primorje-Gorski Kotar County =

Stubica
- Village
- Interactive map of Stubica
- Coordinates: 45°23′04″N 15°06′08″E
- Country: Croatia
- County: Primorje-Gorski Kotar County
- City: Vrbovsko
- Community: Vrbovsko

Area
  - Total: 2 km^{2} (0.77 sq mi)
- Elevation: 524 m (1,719 ft)

Population (2021)
  - Total: 30
  - Density: 15/km^{2} (39/sq mi)
- Time zone: UTC+1 (CET)
  - Summer (DST): UTC+2 (CEST)
- Postal code: 51326
- Area code: +385 051

Stubica or Stubica Vrbovska is a village in Croatia, under the Vrbovsko township, in Primorje-Gorski Kotar County.

== History ==
In 1860–1879, Matija Mažuranić wrote a 62 folio manuscript today titled Writings on the Building of Roads in Gorski Kotar and Lika (Croatian: Spisi o gradnji cesta u Gorskom Kotaru i Lici), today with signature HR-ZaNSK R 6424. A 21 folio manuscript dated 1872 titled Darstellung der Entstehung des Baues ... der Luisenstrasse togethr with a translation by I. Mikloušić is kept as HR-ZaNSK R 4572.

In 1864, a rinderpest outbreak in Bosanci and Kasuni caused the Lujzijana to be closed to horned traffic for 21 days in December.

=== WWII ===
On 29 May 1941, the Ustaše arrested 20 Serb and 7 Croat villagers from Jablan, Hajdine, Presika, Stubica and Tuk. All were imprisoned for 8 to 30 days and then release, only to be recaptured shortly after release. Only Ivan Štiglić, Zvonko Matijević and Jovo Stipanović survived.

On 1 July 1944, Lovorka Kukanić (1921-12-11 – 1944-07-01), substitute commissar of the 13th Partisan Division, was killed in Stubica. On 1 July 1984, UBNOR Vrbovsko erected an L-shaped monument to her in Stubica.

=== Recent ===
Stubica was hit by the 2014 Dinaric ice storm.

On 12 December 2017, a severe wind hit Stubica, blocking traffic to and from it.

In June 2018, the Lovnik water storage unit was found to have a coliform bacteria concentration of 391/100ml, and both Escherichia coli and Enterococcus bacteria were present.

== Demographics ==
As of 2021, there were no inhabitants under the age of 20.

In 1870, Stubica had 26 houses and 173 people.

In 1890, Stubica had 7 houses and 44 people. They attended the school in Vrbovsko regardless of faith. Despite being taxed by Vrbovsko, Stubica was administered by Gomirje.

Village of Stubica: Population trends 1857–2021
v

| population | 211 | 223 | 226 | 198 | 198 | 149 | 116 | 148 | 134 | 128 | 117 | 127 | 117 | 96 | 76 | 53 | 30 |
| | 1857 | 1869 | 1880 | 1890 | 1900 | 1910 | 1921 | 1931 | 1948 | 1953 | 1961 | 1971 | 1981 | 1991 | 2001 | 2011 | 2021 |

Note:Od 1910. do 1961. iskazivano pod imenom Stubica Vrbovska. Sadrži podatke za bivše naselje Kamensko Vrbovsko koje je do 1948. iskazivano kao naselje. U 2001. povećano za dio naselja Tuk i Vrbovsko u kojima je sadržan dio podataka u navedenom razdoblju. Sources: Croatian Bureau of Statistics publications

=== Further reading ===
- Kraljevski zemaljski statistički ured (1903). Političko i sudbeno razdieljenje i Repertorij prebivališta Kraljevina Hrvatske i Slavonije po stanju od 1. travnja 1903. Zagreb: Kraljevska hrvatsko-slavonsko-dalmatinska zemaljska vlada, 🖶 Kraljevska zemaljska tiskara.
- Kraljevski zemaljski statistički ured (May 1913). "Repertorij prebivališta po županijama, upravnim kotarima, gradovima, upravnim i poreznim općinama". Političko i sudbeno razdjeljenje i Repertorij prebivališta Kraljevina Hrvatske i Slavonije po stanju od 1. siječnja 1913. Zagreb: Kraljevska hrvatsko-slavonsko-dalmatinska zemaljska vlada, 🖶 Kraljevska zemaljska tiskara. pp. 1–126. Pages 22, 33.

== Politics ==
As of its foundation on 3 March 2008, it belongs to the local committee of Vrbovsko.

== Infrastructure ==
The water storage unit Lovnik, with a capacity of 130 cubic metres (4,600 ft^{3}) at an elevation of 610 metres (2,000 ft), is responsible for part of Vrbovsko and for Hajdine, Presika, Kamensko and Stubica.

Stubica has an Udaljeni pretplatnički multipleksor (UPM).

== Bibliography ==
- Korenčić, Mirko (1979). Naselja i stanovništvo Socijalističke Republike Hrvatske (1857–1971) [Villages and Population of the Socialist Republic of Croatia (1857–1971)]. Djela Jugoslavenske akademije znanosti i umjetnosti (in Serbo-Croatian). Vol. 54.
