= Kamačnik Bridge =

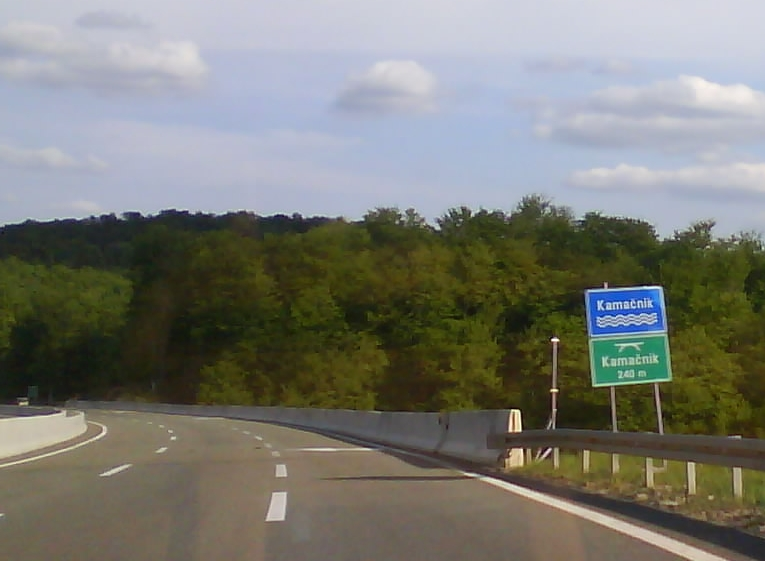
- Coordinates: 45.358991°N 15.065475°E
- Carries: A6 motorway
- Crosses: Kamačnik stream
- Locale: Gorski Kotar, Croatia
- Official name: Most Kamačnik
- Maintained by: Autocesta Rijeka–Zagreb

Characteristics
- Design: Box girder bridge
- Total length: 240 m
- Width: 2 x 13.05 m
- Longest span: 127.1 m
- Clearance above: 29 m

History
- Opened: 2003

Statistics
- Toll: charged as a part of A6 motorway toll

Kamačnik Bridge is located between the Vrbovsko and Ravna Gora interchanges of the A6 motorway in Gorski Kotar, Croatia, spanning Kamačnik stream. It is 240 metres (790 ft) long. The bridge was designed by Zlatko Šavor. It consists of two parallel structures, both completed in 2003 by Konstruktor. The bridge is tolled within the A6 motorway ticket system and there are no separate toll plazas associated with use of the bridge.

The bridge spans 60 metres (200 ft) deep Kamačnik stream bridge canyon which is legally protected as a listed landscape. This prevents any construction on the canyon cliffs and in turn requires an asymmetrical structure across a span of approximately 125 metres (410 ft).

== Structure description ==
At this location the motorway route follows a horizontal curve therefore the transversal grade of the deck is slightly increased. It is constant and equals 4.2%, while elevation grade of the bridge is constant at 5.7%, sloping down towards Vrbovsko. The bridge is a box girder structure supporting the deck across three spans. The southbound bridge spans are 71.18 m (233.5 ft) + 127.1 m (417 ft) + 23.9 m (78 ft). Its piers are 29 metres (95 ft) and 6.46 metres (21.2 ft) tall. The northbound bridge spans are 69.86 m (229.2 ft) + 127.74 m (419.1 ft) + 23.45 m (76.9 ft). Its piers are 23.17 metres (76.0 ft) and 7.5 metres (25 ft) tall. All of the piers comprise box cross section, 7.5 m (25 ft) (perpendicular to the bridge axis) by 4.5 m (15 ft) to 3.5 m (11 ft) (parallel to the bridge axis. The parallel bridge structures were built simultaneously.

== Traffic volume ==
Traffic is regularly counted and reported by Autocesta Rijeka–Zagreb, operator of the viaduct and the A6 motorway where the structure is located, and published by Hrvatske ceste. Substantial variations between annual (AADT) and summer (ASDT) traffic volumes are attributed to the fact that the bridge carries substantial tourist traffic to the Adriatic resorts. The traffic count is performed using analysis of motorway toll ticket sales.

Kamačnik Bridge traffic volume
Road	Counting site	AADT	ASDT	Notes
A6	3006 Vrbovsko west	11,979	20,091	Between Vrbovsko and Ravna Gora interchanges.

== See also ==
- List of bridges by length
