= Vrelo =

Vrelo may refer to:

== Places ==
=== Bosnia and Herzegovina ===
- Vrelo (Cazin)

=== Kosovo ===
- Vrelo (Istok)

=== Serbia ===
- Vrelo (Aleksinac)
- Vrelo (Babušnica)
- Vrelo (Kuršumlija)
- Vrelo (Niš)
- Vrelo (Ub)

== Other ==
- Vrelo (river)
