= Sperry–Piltz Ice Accumulation Index =

Measurement of ice storm intensity

The Sperry–Piltz Ice Accumulation Index, or SPIA Index, is a scale for rating ice storm intensity, based on the expected footprint of an ice storm, the expected ice accumulation as a result of a storm, and the expected damage a storm inflicts on human-built structures, especially exposed overhead utility systems such as power lines.

== Background ==
The index was introduced in 2007 by Sidney Sperry of the Oklahoma Association of Electric Cooperatives, who developed the index together with Steven Piltz, Meteorologist-In-Charge at the National Weather Service office in Tulsa, Oklahoma.

Sperry approached Piltz about collaborating on the development of an ice accumulation algorithm to predict days in advance the damage potential of approaching ice storms.

He advocated three key parameters for the development of the algorithm:

- Storm total rainfall and subsequent total ice accumulation if temperatures for the duration of the event remain below freezing.
- Wind speeds and directions.
  - Damage grows incrementally with increasing winds, and power line damage is worst along east–west electric lines, meaning northerly and southerly winds are most damaging during an event.
- Temperatures for the duration of the event.

Piltz and his team of meteorologists developed Sperry's "ice accumulation algorithm" that incorporates various radial ice accumulation measurements, wind speed and direction data and temperature forecasts for a storm event period, and assimilated that data into a "Potential Utility Damage Scale," much like the enhanced Fujita scale or the Saffir–Simpson hurricane wind scale.

The factors were combined with the National Weather Service's "Extended Forecast Models" (EFMs), National Digital Forecasting Database (NDFD), and related forecasting software, revising and updating the models every hour. Using this method, officials at the Tulsa office of the National Weather Service were able to predict the intensity and duration of an ice storm 72 to 96 hours, or three to four days, in advance. The EFMs and NDFD are continually updated so the degree of forecasting accuracy improves as more data is gathered about the approaching storm system. Research and testing of the index was aided by officials at the Oklahoma Climatological Survey in Norman, Oklahoma.

== Use in the US ==
The index was first formally used by officials at the National Weather Service in Tulsa to predict the potential damage related to an ice storm event which hit areas of northeastern Oklahoma and northwestern and northern Arkansas on January 26–28, 2009. Using the NWS EFMs in conjunction with the index, officials conducted a series of "Winter Storm Webinars" to brief state, county and city emergency management officials in both Oklahoma and Arkansas, and also officials with electric utilities, telephone companies, cable companies, public service commissions and disaster preparedness agencies such as the Red Cross and 2-1-1 Resources, plus area shelters, about the approaching storm and the impact that it was predicted to have on exposed overhead utility systems. A "Level 5" event was forecast at least three days in advance of the storm.

The index is licensed to the National Weather Service and the Federal Emergency Management Agency. The NWS is currently conducting operational tests of the index at 11 forecast offices:

1. Tulsa, OK
2. Springfield, MO
3. Kansas City, MO
4. St. Louis, MO
5. Paducah, KY
6. Little Rock, AR
7. Jackson, MS
8. Memphis, TN
9. Nashville, TN
10. Norman, OK
11. Atlanta, GA

== Parameters ==
Sperry–Piltz Ice Accumulation Index
Ice damage index	Radial ice	Wind	Damage and impact descriptions
0	0–0.25 in (0–6 mm)	0–15 mph (0–24 km/h)	Minimal risk of damage to exposed utility systems; no alerts or advisories needed for crews, few outages.
1	0.10–0.25 in (3–6 mm)	15–25 mph (24–40 km/h)	Some isolated or localized utility interruptions are possible, typically lasting only a few hours. Roads and bridges may become slick and hazardous.
1	0.25–0.50 in (6–13 mm)	0–15 mph (0–24 km/h)	Some isolated or localized utility interruptions are possible, typically lasting only a few hours. Roads and bridges may become slick and hazardous.
2	0.10–0.25 in (3–6 mm)	25–35 mph (40–56 km/h)	Scattered utility interruptions expected, typically lasting 12 to 24 hours. Roads and travel conditions may be extremely hazardous due to ice accumulation.
2	0.25–0.50 in (6–13 mm)	15–25 mph (24–40 km/h)	Scattered utility interruptions expected, typically lasting 12 to 24 hours. Roads and travel conditions may be extremely hazardous due to ice accumulation.
2	0.50–0.75 in (13–19 mm)	0–15 mph (0–24 km/h)	Scattered utility interruptions expected, typically lasting 12 to 24 hours. Roads and travel conditions may be extremely hazardous due to ice accumulation.
3	0.10–0.25 in (3–6 mm)	Over 35 mph (56 km/h)	Numerous utility interruptions with some damage to main feeder lines and equipment expected. Tree limb damage is excessive. Outages lasting 1 to 5 days.
3	0.25–0.50 in (6–13 mm)	25–35 mph (40–56 km/h)	Numerous utility interruptions with some damage to main feeder lines and equipment expected. Tree limb damage is excessive. Outages lasting 1 to 5 days.
3	0.50–0.75 in (13–19 mm)	15–25 mph (24–40 km/h)	Numerous utility interruptions with some damage to main feeder lines and equipment expected. Tree limb damage is excessive. Outages lasting 1 to 5 days.
3	0.75–1.00 in (19–25 mm)	0–15 mph (0–24 km/h)	Numerous utility interruptions with some damage to main feeder lines and equipment expected. Tree limb damage is excessive. Outages lasting 1 to 5 days.
4	0.25–0.50 in (6–13 mm)	Over 35 mph (56 km/h)	Prolonged and widespread utility interruptions with extensive damage to main distribution feeder lines and some high voltage transmission lines/structures. Outages lasting 5 to 10 days.
4	0.50–0.75 in (13–19 mm)	25–35 mph (40–56 km/h)	Prolonged and widespread utility interruptions with extensive damage to main distribution feeder lines and some high voltage transmission lines/structures. Outages lasting 5 to 10 days.
4	0.75–1.00 in (19–25 mm)	15–25 mph (24–40 km/h)	Prolonged and widespread utility interruptions with extensive damage to main distribution feeder lines and some high voltage transmission lines/structures. Outages lasting 5 to 10 days.
4	1.00–1.50 in (25–38 mm)	0–15 mph (0–24 km/h)	Prolonged and widespread utility interruptions with extensive damage to main distribution feeder lines and some high voltage transmission lines/structures. Outages lasting 5 to 10 days.
5	0.50–0.75 in (13–19 mm)	Over 35 mph (56 km/h)	Catastrophic damage to entire exposed utility systems, including both distribution and transmission networks. Outages could last several weeks in some areas. Shelters needed.
5	0.75–1.00 in (19–25 mm)	Over 25 mph (40 km/h)	Catastrophic damage to entire exposed utility systems, including both distribution and transmission networks. Outages could last several weeks in some areas. Shelters needed.
5	1.00–1.50 in (25–38 mm)	Over 15 mph (24 km/h)	Catastrophic damage to entire exposed utility systems, including both distribution and transmission networks. Outages could last several weeks in some areas. Shelters needed.
5	Over 1.50 in (38 mm)	Any	Catastrophic damage to entire exposed utility systems, including both distribution and transmission networks. Outages could last several weeks in some areas. Shelters needed.

Wind speeds and radial ice accumulation have a large impact on the index.

Weather conditions and SPIA Index levels at a glance
Radial ice	Wind			
Radial ice	0–15 mph (0–24 km/h)	15–25 mph (24–40 km/h)	25–35 mph (40–56 km/h)	Over 35 mph (56 km/h)
0.10–0.25 in (3–6 mm)	0	1	2	3
0.25–0.50 in (6–13 mm)	1	2	3	4
0.50–0.75 in (13–19 mm)	2	3	4	5
0.75–1.00 in (19–25 mm)	3	4	5	5
1.00–1.50 in (25–38 mm)	4	5	5	5
Over 1.50 in (38 mm)	5	5	5	5

== See also ==
- Rohn Emergency Scale for measuring the magnitude (intensity) of an emergency
- Severe weather terminology (United States)
