= 2014 Dinaric ice storm =

Weather event in the Slovenia and Croatia

The 2014 Dinaric ice storm, better known as the 2014 Slovenia ice storm or 2014 Croatia ice storm, was a severe ice storm (SPIA 5) that struck the Northwest Dinaric Alps between 31 January and 2 February 2014. The freezing rain led to glazing of a vast region with about 10–50 millimetres (0.39–1.97 in) of ice, locally above 100 millimetres (3.9 in). It wrecked roofs, power lines an forests, causing power loss for hundreds of thousands. Initially, Cyclone Ilija (2014) was believed to be the cause. But later investigation showed S and SW geostrophic wind dominated at the time.

The population affected by electricity loss included about 250,000 people in Slovenia and about 14,000 households in Gorski Kotar, or about 80% of its population. Without electricity, water supply pumps stopped working, leaving many without tap water until power could be restored with engine–generators.

This event provided the impetus for the development of a freezing rain prediction program by the ECMWF.

== Slovenia ==
The worst affected area was Inner Carniola, especially around Postojna. By 3 February, 120,000 households were still waiting for electricity to be restored and 40% of schools remained closed. The Minister of Defence of Slovenia, Roman Jakič, relayed that an estimated 500 tonnes of steel, cables and electricity posts remained on the ground. More than 300 power lines were broken. Almost half of all Slovenia's forests were damaged in the storm, including 40% of Alpine forests destroyed.

== Gorski Kotar ==
In Gorski Kotar, power lines fell on the A6 motorway, causing closure of the route to Rijeka between Bosiljevo and Kikovica, and between Kikovica and Delnice in the direction of Zagreb. There, it took about 10 days to restore essential infrastructure to most of entire region, and within months electricity was back in almost all of its former range, but at a cost of about 84.4 million HRK to HEP, whose Elektroprimorje Rijeka branch was responsible for restoring electricity in most of the affected area. At the time it was the largest peacetime damage since the Secession from Yugoslavia, even without counting the forestry losses. Clearing blocked forestry roads and forest paths would take years, and thanks to the declining population some were never cleared.

As a result of the sudden large volume of dead wood, the region's Picea abies forests were plagued with an Ips typographus epidemic that became severe in 2016 and lasted until 2018 in Gorski Kotar.

== Selected works ==
- Janeš, Filip (2021-06-30). Utjecaj ledene kiše i potkornjaka na šume Gorskog Kotara i provođenje potrebnih ddd mjera u svrhu sprječavanja širenja smrekovog pisara [The influence of ice rain and bark beetle on the forests of Gorski Kotar and the implementation of the necessary DDD measures for the purpose of preventing the spread of spruce scripture class] (Thesis) (in Croatian). Rijeka: Medicinski fakultet Sveučilišta u Rijeci.
- Komarčević, Mario (2017-08-01). Procjena i analiza oštećenosti stabala i sastojina djelovanjem ledoloma na području Gorskog kotara [Assessment and analysis of trees and stands damaged by ice storm in the Gorski kotar region] (Thesis) (in Croatian). Zagreb: Fakultet šumarstva i drvne tehnologije Sveučilišta u Zagrebu.
- Sertić, Milan (2016-12-06). Zaštita šuma od ledoloma na primjeru šumske štete 2014. godine u UŠP Karlovac, UŠP Ogulin, UŠP Delnice i Nacionalnom parku Risnjak [Protection of Forests from Ice Breakage after the Example of the Forest Damage of the Year 2014 in UŠP Karlovac, UŠP Ogulin, UŠP Delnice and Risnjak National Park] (Thesis) (in Croatian). Karlovac: Veleučilište u Karlovcu.
- Šoštarić, Miroslav (2016-11-22) [defended 2016-09-09]. Prirodno pomlađivanje nakon ledoloma u jelovo-bukovim sastojinama na području Gerova [Natural regeneration of ice-damaged fir-beech stands in the area of Gerovo] (Thesis) (in Croatian). Zagreb: Šumarski fakultet Sveučilišta u Zagrebu.
- Forbes, Richard; Tsonevsky, Ivan; Hewson, Tim; Leutbecher, Martin (2014). "Towards predicting high-impact freezing rain events". ECMWF Newsletter. 141: 15–21. doi:10.21957/xcauc5jf.
