= Severin na Kupi =

- Village
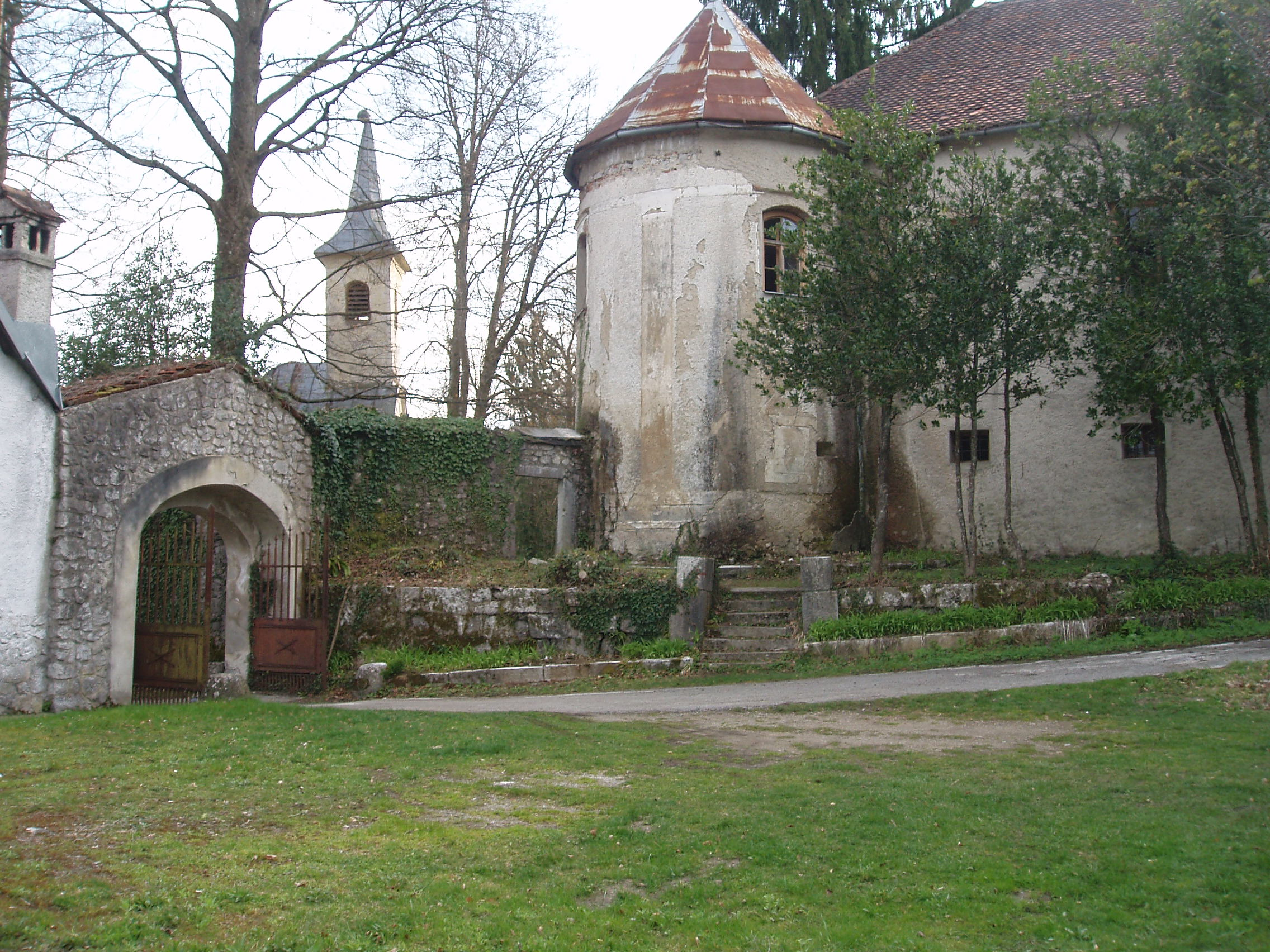
- Castle front yard
- Interactive map of Severin na Kupi
- Location within Croatia
- Coordinates: 45°25′N 15°10′E
- Country: Croatia
- County: Primorje-Gorski Kotar County
- City: Vrbovsko

Area
  - Total: 1.5 km^{2} (0.58 sq mi)
- Elevation: 231 m (758 ft)

Population (2021)
  - Total: 113
  - Density: 75/km^{2} (200/sq mi)
- Time zone: UTC+1 (CET)
  - Summer (DST): UTC+2 (CEST)
- Postal code: 51329
- Area code: +385 51

Severin na Kupi is a village and part of Vrbovsko municipality, in Primorje-Gorski Kotar County, in Croatia. It is situated above the Kupa valley on the part of the D3 highway formerly known as the Lujzijana. It is known for the cliffside Severin castle, one of the best preserved remains of an extensive Christian fortification network during the Turkish wars. As of 2021, it has a population of 113. It was once more populous, and in 1776-1786 it was the titular seat of its own county.

== Name ==
Severin na Kupi is not to be confused with Severin Bilogorski. There is also a Severin in Polabia. Most importantly, it may be named after Severin of the historical Banate of Severin. A connection with Saint Severin cannot be ruled out, but there is no significant local veneration of a saint by that name, and one historical source uses the form Siverin instead, possibly indicating an early Chakavian attempt to rationalize the name as sěverъ "north".

It was recorded as Szeverin on the 1673 map of Stjepan Glavač.

== Geography ==
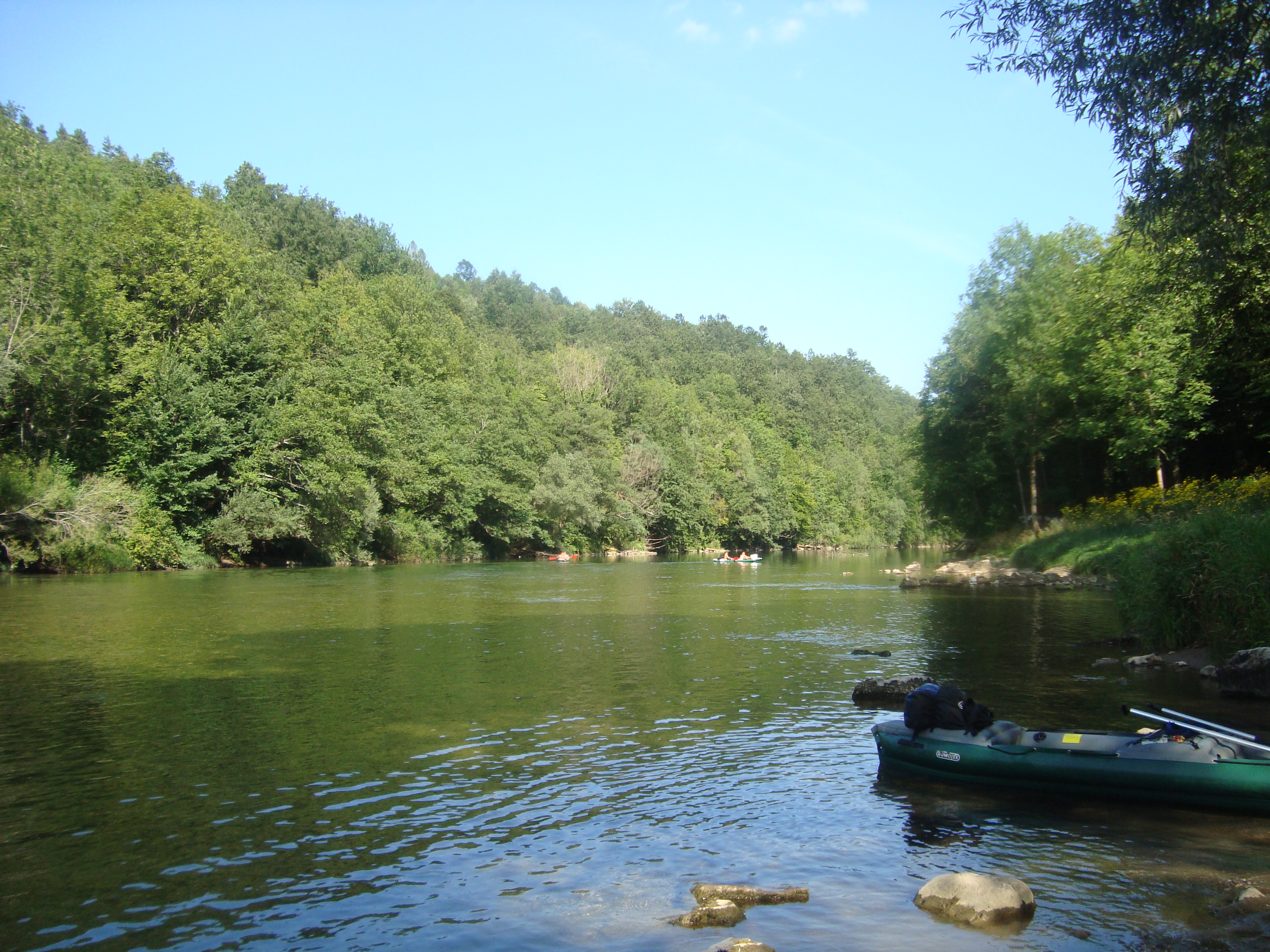
Kupa at Riblje by Severin

There outer wall of the castle is not defensive in origin, apart from the main gate and outer courtyard gate, which guard the entrance to the castle. The western outer wall is decorative apart from the westernmost enclosure, which served to keep game in. There is no wall on the north, which is bounded by a steep slope, with a narrow footpath consisting of hairpin turns leading down to the Kupa river below from the castle grounds, and a similar path 505 metres (1,657 ft) long from the east gate of the castle grounds down to the waterhouse.

Floorplans of the castle have been made by the Austrian cadastral surveyors (1862), by Gjuro Szabo (1920) and by Frigyes Kőnig and József Szatanek (2009).

== Climate ==
The climate is harsher than in most of the Kordun, but milder than in most of Gorski Kotar.

== History ==
=== Frankopan period ===
The castle of Severin was not mentioned in the 1486 Modruše urbarium entry for Brnardin Frankapan's (Note: Brnardin would later build Ogulin.) possession of Lukovdol, but was mentioned (for the first time) in a 1558 damage assessment of Stjepan IV Frankapan Ozaljski following a Turkish raid. Lopašić believed the castle already existed at the time the urbarium was drawn up, but there can be no confirmation without Oxygen dating.

A raid in 1577 by the bey of Livno was even more disastrous for the population of the Severin area than that of 1558.

Upon the death of Stjepan Ozaljski in 1577, the castle was inherited by the sons of Nikola Šubić Zrinski thanks to the former's 1572 will, but in 1580 they had to give Severin up to Gašpar I Frankapan Tržački. The seat of the Tržački family was in Bosiljevo, but they sometimes spent time in Severin.

After the gains of the Turkish invasion were halted with the construction of Karlovac in 1579 and started to be reversed, the abandoned areas were resettled. Already in 1544, Nikola Šubić Zrinski settled Catholics from Rmanj in the nearby Vukova Gorica, Prilišće and Rosopajnik. The area around Severin was resettled with Slovene and German serfs from Carniola, and especially Gottschee. Surnames like Rauch, Schneeberger, Verderber, Znelač and so on began to appear in the Severin area. Although some pre-Turkish surnames survived in the area among returnees.

In 1601-1609, general Vid Kisel baron of Fužine (Ljubljana) settled Vlachs around Severin.

In 1609, the estate of Gašpar Frankapan was divided among his three sons. Severin went to the youngest son, Vuk II Krsto Frankapans. Vuk did not live in Severin, but in Novigrad na Dobri, thanks to the enmity that arose between the local Vlachs and the Frankapan family after the latter tried to collect taxes from them, whereas according to Kisel they were only obligated to provide military service. One time, Vuk was ambushed by the Vlachs, but Vuk escaped.

In 1625, Vuk relieved the residents of Gorica above Severin of various duties and made them freedmen.

On 4 June 1657, as part of a delimitation between the possessions of the Zrinski family in Brod and those of the Frankapan family in Severin, a document was drawn up before a committee in Moravičke Drage consisting of baron Planker oberhautmann of Karlovac on behalf of Juraj IV Frankapan and Juraj Sili kapetan dvoranski and vicekapetan of Žumberak and Boltizar Babonosić prefect of Ozalj on behalf of Petar Zrinski. Those who gave testimony about the boundary were Martin Goljak (80), Matija Šnepergar (80), Mihajlo Šepec (80), Petar Butina (85), Petar Abramović (85), Lovro Crnković (85), Juraj Šnepergar (88), Juraj Podnar (90), Matija Goljak (90), Jakov Goršet (90), Jakov Butina (90) and Martin Blažević who claimed to be a centenarian and helped build the Turanj tower in Gornje Moravice when ordered by brothers Juraj and Nikola Zrinski.

In the final years of the Frankapan period, the estate of Severin was administered by Juraj Kukuljević, and the last Frankapan era lord of Severin was Ivan Stanešić.

In 1670, during the Magnate rebellion, Severin was plundered by German officers from Karlovac. Fran Krsto Frankopan was beheaded in 1671.

=== Cameral period ===
After the beheading, Severin was acquired first by the Hungarian and then by the Graz Chamber until 1682. Grgur Pavišić administered the estate as inspektor, while Juraj Kukuljević was responsible for its economic affairs as fisk.

Janko Herendić, whose fiefs were in Bubnjarci, Lipa and on the Mrežnica, acquired a smaller share of the fief of Severin. On 20 April 1679, Janko wrote a land grant for Ivan Benić in the house of his brother priest Ferenc Herendić in Severin. The transcript survives in the HDA in Zagreb, and was published by Rudolf Strohal. The parish of Lukovdol, to which Severin belonged, may have been Glagolitic as late as the 17th century.

=== Oršić period ===
On 20 April 1682, Leopold I granted the larger part of the fief of Severin to Ivan Franjo Oršić for his services in suppressing the Magnate rebellion, for which he became captain of Križanić Turanj and was made a baron and appointed to the Modruš captainate in place of Johann Adam von Purgstall, at a price of 10,000 forint paid to the Hofkammer and 7228 to the kaptol in the name of a debt remaining from the time of Petar Zrinski.

On 1 February 1718, grof Bernard Oršić of Slavetić wrote a land grant in Severin for Paval Gerić, concerning his vineyard on Veliki vrh, bordering that of Marko Severinski to the right, of Oršić himself to the left, Malinska steza below and Babićev obrov above. The transcript by S. Sečen, chancellary of Severin, survives in the HDA.

In 1736, Severin na Kupi (Note: Severin Bilogorski would be more likely, but the involvement of the bishop of Senj seems to favour Severin na Kupi.) may have been the Severin in which the Metropolitan of Gornji Karlovac, Danilo Ljubotina, had intended to found a new bishopric.

By the time of the visit of the Zagreb County commission under judex nobilium Franjo Dolovac and adjunct Antun Spišić in June 1774, the territory of the former Frankopan fief of Severin had been divided into 4:

1. The fief of Krsto II Oršić with the castle of Severin and serfs in: Severin itself, Klanac, Damalj, Plešivica, Jadrč, Randosti, Kosac, Blaževci, Štefanci, Zapeć, Plemenitaš, Lukovdol, Gorenci, Močile, Draga and Smišljak.
2. The fief of widow Ana Vojković née De Pozzi with serfs in: Umol, Grabek, Dugače, Beč, Crnomanji, Radočaj, Gorenci, Lisičina and Gorica.
3. The fief of the future podžupan Juraj I Ivančić with serfs in: Umol, Grabek, Dugače and Beč.
4. The fief of Barbara Tompe with serfs in Umol and Grabek.

Severin had a relatively high population of freedmen, but freedmen in the sense that they were free from the physical and transport corvées. They were still obliged to perform carpentry and masonry for the castle.

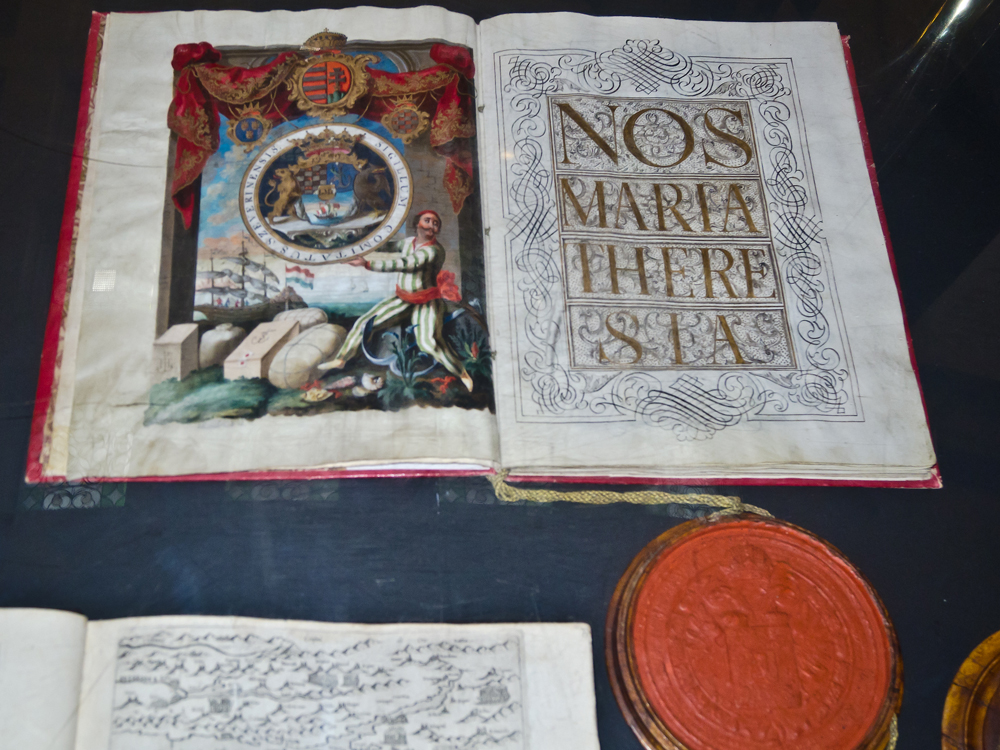
Crest of Severin County at the HDA in Zagreb

On 14 February 1776, the Severin County was created by Maria Theresa, named after Severin, but with Karlovac as its capital, although county assemblies were sometimes held in Mrkopalj or Rijeka. (Note: Even after the Queen's Patent, of 23 April 1779, which placed Rijeka with its kotar under direct royal rule and forbade Rijeka from meddling in the affairs of other kotars, the city of Rijeka continued to host both the mala skupština (3 December 1779, 3 January 1785 ...) and the velika skupština (6 April 1780) of Severin County.) It was created after a 1765 decree called for the restoration of the ancient Vinodol County, largely on the initiative of Krsto Oršić, who granted rooms in his castle for use as offices. It was abolished on 20 March 1786 by Joseph II, allegedly because of low tax revenues, with the town of Severin being transferred to Zagreb County as a kotar. The memory of this county would live on in Severin itself, which painted its crest on a building in the town square in the 21st century, and which travellers continued to hear about when passing through Severin throughout the 19th century:

Severin, a small town belonging to the Vraniczany family, with a castle on a cliff by the Kupa; an independent county once bore its name, which is today united with Zagreb county. (Note: Severin, jedno malo, na obitelj plem. Vraniczany spadajuće, s gradom na jednoj klisuri polag Kupe město; ovog je prie jedna poseba varmedja ime svoje nosila, koja danas sa zagrebačkom sjedinjena upravlja se.)

— Dragutin Seljan (1843)

In 1780, the Report of the Commission for the Introduction of Urbarial Organisation on the Possessions of Klanac, Damalj, Plešivica and Severin na Kupi (Croatian: Izvještaj komisije za uvođenje urbarskog uređenja na posjedima Klanac, Damlja, Plješivica i Severin na Kupi), today with signature HR-ZaNSK R 6687, was drawn up.

In 1803, Ivan Oršić renovated the old fortress of Severin as a residential castle, leaving the following inscription on a plaque above the main gate:

An̄o millesimo octingentesimo peracto.
Quæ vetus Arx olim nunc in novotecto resurgit,
Haec FRANGEPANÆ stirpis avita fuit.
Moræ suæ gentis, Quod hospes ab hospite tutus
non erat, opposuit ferrea Chatra minis
Nunc COMITIS cura reparante JOANIS ab ORSSICH
hospita pacifico facta ciucue patet.
Aut sic, aut aliter reparabant forte Nepotes
Nunc mihi sic placuit, tunc aliter placeat.

The original castle was a tall fortress occupying the present northwest and northeast corners, forming two square towers with a chapel between them, a moat surrounding them, and a moat surrounding them, complete with a drawbridge. The castle was reduced to a ground floor, a storey and an attic, but was expanded in area by the inclusion of a courtyard. Cylindrical towers in the style of the Kerestinec castle were added to each of its southern corners. A cistern was dug outside the castle, to which water was transported by aerial lift from the Kupa at a spot where a waterhouse was later built. The cistern is surrounded by stone seats with a view of Kot pri Damlju, whose slopes were once vineyards, supplying the castle with most of its wine, which was stored in the retaining wall of the uppermost terrace.

After the construction of the 141 kilometres (88 mi) long Lujzijana road in 1803-1811, Severin gained a new importance as one of the larger towns on the road from Karlovac to Rijeka. For example, the Seljan map of 1847 skips Komorske Moravice, Skrad and Lokve along the Lujzijana, featuring nothing between Severin and Mrzla Vodica. The construction of the road, eventually named after Marie Louise, Duchess of Parma, began under Josip Filip Vukasović in Rijeka in 1803, and reached Severin in 1808, shortly before Vukasović's death of a wound sustained at the Battle of Wagram. The road was completed to Karlovac in 1809 by the French. This road would greatly increase regional logging exports and bring significant traffic through Severin. Later on, the shareholder's society of the Lujzijana, (Note: Later called the kr. pov. Družtvo lujzinske ceste.) with seat in Vienna would purchase land in Severin, constructing a tollbooth there. In 1874, the society would sell all its assets along the road, including the large building they constructed in Severin.

In 1860–1879, Matija Mažuranić wrote a 62 folio manuscript today titled Writings on the Building of Roads in Gorski Kotar and Lika (Croatian: Spisi o gradnji cesta u Gorskom Kotaru i Lici), today with signature HR-ZaNSK R 6424. A 21 folio manuscript dated 1872 titled Darstellung der Entstehung des Baues ... der Luisenstrasse togethr with a translation by I. Mikloušić is kept as HR-ZaNSK R 4572.

As a temporary measure devised by the József Majláth commission during the unification of trans-Sava provinces, the Severin District was founded by royal decree on 5 July 1822. The intent was to re-establish the Severin Županija, but it was instead decided to transfer the Severin District to Zagreb County on 2 September 1823, ending the short-lived district.

=== Vranjican period ===
The Vranjican period was and often still is considered to be the golden age of Severin's history. Thanks to the family's industrial wealth, the town saw unprecedented economic growth, retention of administrative importance disproportionate to its population, and high leadership approval. Immediately after, the town stagnated severely. The increase in population in the Vranjican period gave way to emigration and economic success would not return until the asphalt pavement of the Lujzijana allowed for the development of a considerable foodservice industry in the 1970s.

After the expansion of Russian grain exports and exports of Italian wine, Ambroz Vranjican (1779-1870) shifted to oak planks, purchasing the castle of Severin from Karlo Oršić in 1823. He and his brother Ivan made their wealth as merchants trading Dalmatian wine and wheat on the Adriatic, living in Senj since 1803. Their surname derives from Vranjic in Dalmatia, fleeing the Turks in the 1530s for Brač. Ambroz Vranjican's ancestors then moved to Hvar, settling in Stari Grad. Ambroz attained Austrian nobility in 1822, changing his surname to von Vragnizan, upon attaining Hungarian nobility in 1827 to Vranyczány, and upon being knighted by Ferdinand I Vranyczany von Dobrinovich.

One autumn evening in 1829, (Note: Either then or in a different attack. "... Ambroz je detaljno opisao u autobiografiji. Drugi, hajdučki napad na Severin detaljno je praćen u Agramer Zeitungu u brojevima od 3, 4, 11, 12, 21. i 24. 11. te ponovno 6. 12. 1853; AMBROZ st. VRANYCZANY, (bilj. 65), 23–25." — Regan 2016:41) a group of 13 robbers showed up at the castle just after an aged Ambroz had sat down with those of his guests who had not yet left the table to dine. The guests fled to all corners of the castle, some hiding in the chimney openings in the walls. They killed his wife Agnes von Spišić. But two guards shot volley after volley with an intensity that induced the robbers to flee, leaving one dead and another heavily wounded behind.

In 1831, his son Josip was born. In 1834, his daughter Agneza was born in Severin. In 1841, his younger son Emanuel was born.

As part of the Illyrian movement, Ambroz Vranjican often wrote his name Vranyczany-Dobrinović. Ambroz often hosted prominent members of the movement at Severin, including Ivan Mažuranić, Janko Drašković and Josip Jelačić. Together with Mažuranić, Antun Vakanović and Dragutin Kušlan he helped found the Illyrian Library (Croatian: Ilirska čitaonica) in Zagreb in 1838.

In 1844, Ambroz founded the Savsko-kupsko društvo parobrodjenja, which operated the steamboat Sloga between Sisak and Zemun, and was originally intended to sail the Kupa. Ambroz also tried to get the Vukovar–Rijeka railway built.

During the Revolutions of 1848, Ambroz was selected by the Zagreb magistrate to carry a petition to the emperor, and together with Ivan Kukuljević Sakcinski and Ljudevit Gaj he was designated part of the committee that would take political leadership in Croatia, Slavonia in the event Jelačić should be incapacitated. The Vranjican family had a good relationship with their serfs, so that after the abolition of serfdom in Croatia, there were complaints about having to serve multiple masters and pay taxes exceeding their existing duties. Later in 1848, Ambroz became a representative at the Croatian Parliament. Ambroz served on the Imperial Council (1851, 1859), and in 1851-1858, during Bach's absolutism, Ambroz was president of the Matica ilirska.

When the alcohol tax was introduced in 1850, producers in Rijeka could choose between paying in Severin or at the thirtieth office in Orehovica, Rijeka or Jelenje.

In 1852, Agneza married Josip Marojčić, a captain who until 1848 had served under the command of Laval Nugent von Westmeath, owner of the nearby Bosiljevo castle.

In 1856, Josip returned to Severin from his studies in Zagreb and Prague.

Fran Kurelac finished his manuscript for his book Recimo koju in Severin in 1859 while staying with Josip Vranjican, who met Kurelac while the latter travelling from Zagreb to Rijeka and offered him lodgings until he could finish the book, and eventually paid for its publication. Kurelac wrote the book's dedication under the old linden tree on the castle grounds.

He participated in the 1860-1861 Ban conference, and was re-elected in the 1861 Croatian parliamentary election, joining the Independent National Party in 1863. It was around the time of the Ban conference that Rudolf Strohal, future historian of Severin, saw Ambroz several times when his father drove him there during official inspections as an engineer of the Lujzijana. On one of those occasions, Ambroz asked Strohal's father to draw up a draft for him. Strohal last saw Emanuel when the latter visited the former's father in Stative during his unuccessful challenge of Mate Sladović in the electoral race for representative of Netretić.

In 1861, Josip "Josef, Peppi" (1831-1866) son of Ambroz, a University of Prague graduate, was made the Grand Judge (Croatian: veliki sudac) of Severinski kotar. Josip would also join the Imperial Council (1861), represent the Modrušpotočki kotar in the Croatian Parliament (1861, 1865-1866), and participate in the Croatian regnicolar deputation during the Croatian–Hungarian Settlement (1866).

Also in 1861 (6.2.), the catacomb of the Sv. Florijana chapel on the castle grounds, dedicated to Saint Florian, was completed by mason R.L.

In 1862, as Grand Judge of Severin, Josip Vranjican was responsible for putting down the peasant revolt against Graf Laval Nugent von Westmeath in Bosiljevo.

In 1864, a rinderpest outbreak in Bosanci and Kasuni caused the Lujzijana to be closed to horned traffic for 21 days in December.

Ambroz Vranjican was an important donor during the foundation of the Yugoslav Academy of Sciences and Arts in 1866.

After the unexpected death of Josip Vranjican by illness at the castle in 1866, Radoslav Lopašić was selected to replace him as Grand Judge of the Severinski kotar. Ambroz Vranjican inherited the castle, and he himself died of a stroke on 12 July 1870 in Bad Ragaz. His body was transported to Severin, where his remains were interre in Sv. Florijana.

Around the time of the 1881 unification of the Croatian Military Frontier with the Kingdom of Croatia-Slavonia, there was an initiative to transfer a portion of the territory of Severin and Poljane from the Kingdom of Croatia-Slavonia to the Cisleithania.

The hunting ground of Severin gained fame under the Vranjican family, was known as far as Zagreb and beyond by the 1890s.

The Sv. Florijana chapel on the castle grounds was finished in 1889. Its catacomb once contained the remains of the Vranjican family (Ambroz and Josip), but they were carried off to the grave in Dubovac and the stone containing their names in the church was transported with it, leaving a hole eventually filled with cement. From Dubovac, their remains were further transported to Mirogoj. The transfer of Ambroz's body had previously been opposed by the locals of Severin, so that Ambroz's widow had to build a special closet to transport the body to Karlovac in. His daughter Agneza "Neža" Marojčić née Vanjican died in 1878. In 1891, Emanuel Vranjican died, ending the family's 68 year rule over Severin.

In the late 19th century, a Matica hrvatska branch opened in Severin, with 29 members in 1891.

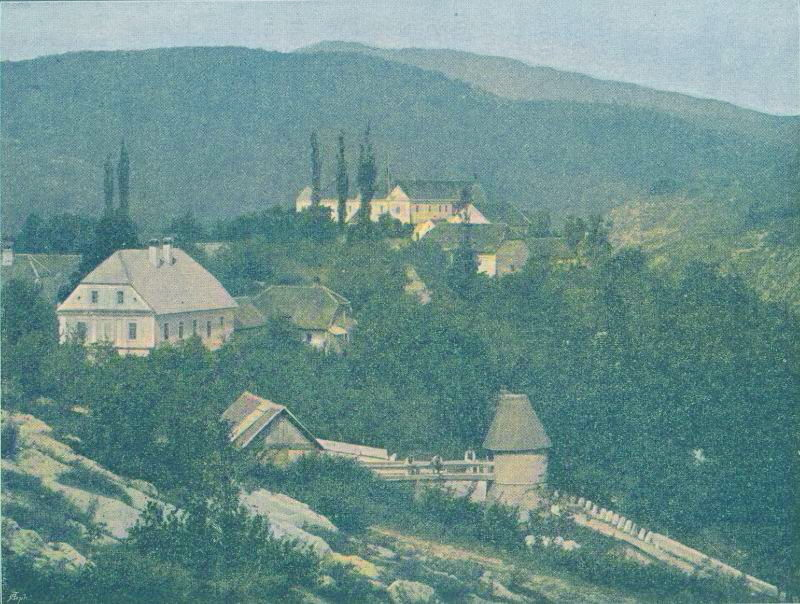
Severin from the southeast in 1895 (original is B/W)

=== Intermediary period ===
After the death of Emanuel, the estate was purchased by the former Podžupan Hinko Francisci, at the time busy serving various functions in the government, so that the castle was actually administered by Baron Gerhard Lepel.

Francisci then sold the castle to Herman Neuberger Klinički, who renovated the castle in 1900, but he soon died.

Before her death, Neuberger's widow Sara then sold the castle with 7 Morgens of land to Dobra d.d. za industriju drva u Zagrebu, leaving the rest to her son Josef Neuberger.

=== Arko period ===
Thanks to an agrarian reform, Dobra had to sell its land. It was purchased by industrialist Vladimir Arko, who also purchased part of what Josef Neuberger still owned and an additional 200 Morgens of land from Severin Općina. Rudolf Strohal knew his father Mijo and his uncle from when he was still studying philosophy at the University of Zagreb in 1876, when the brothers Arko had a store there on Bakačeva street. Rudolf's brother Aleksandar was an even closer friend, and died in the Arko brother's house in 1918.

Under Arko, deer were still kept on the west part of the castle grounds, guarded by wooden rails.

Ivan Kumbatović, member of the Old Church Slavonic Academy and parish priest of Lukovdol 1913–1921, resided in Severin.

In the interwar period, a sawmill was built at Riblje on the Kupa. The wood was originally sent to Rijeka and later to Sušak. It ceased operating during and after WWII.

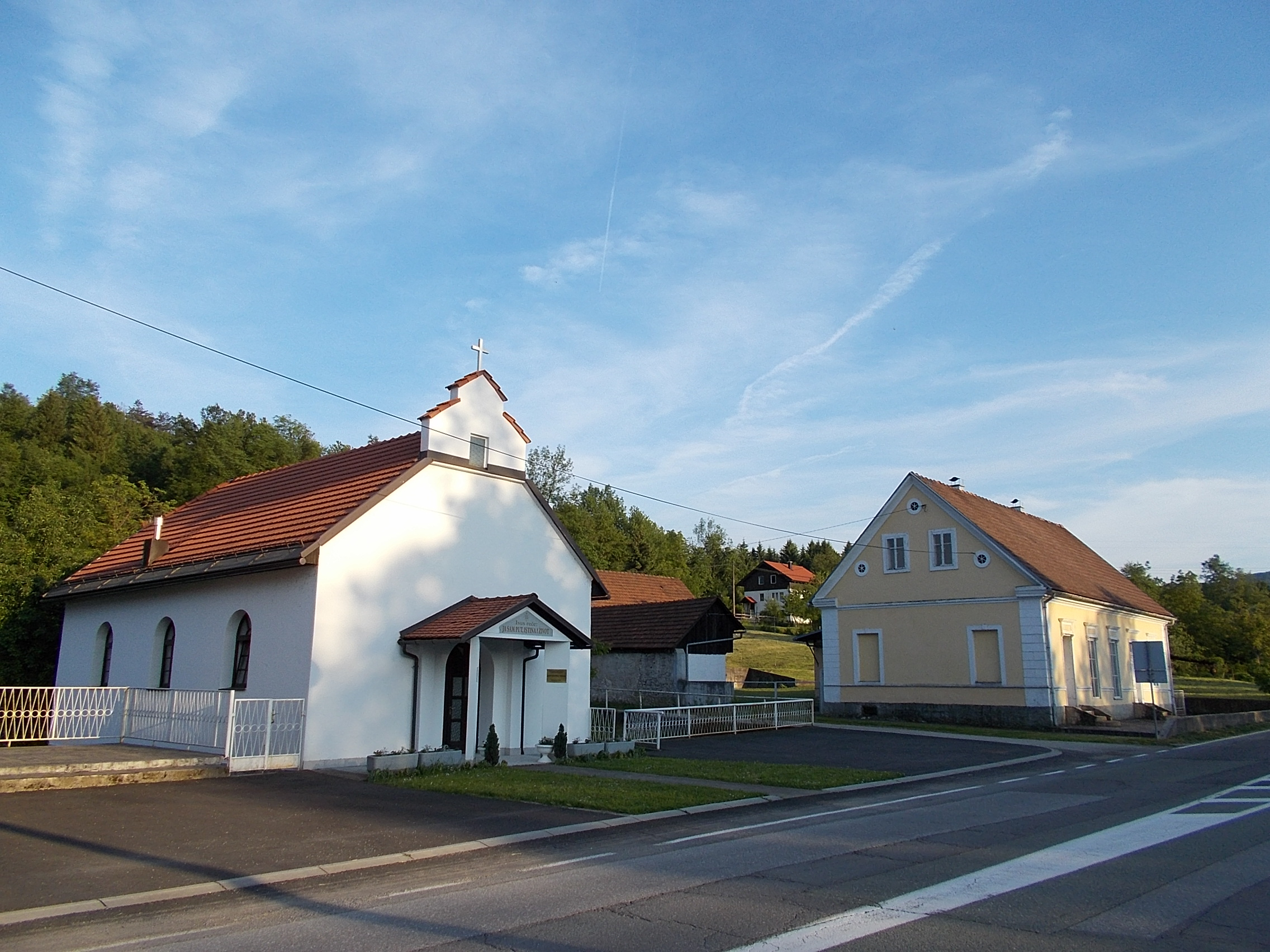
Baptist church

In 1932, Jovo Jekić formally opened a church for the converts to the Baptist denomination made in Močile by a travelling preacher the year before. In August 1933, 42 were baptised in the Kupa. Initially, they met in the house of Mijo Časni, (Note: (1884 – 1965)) but for reasons of space they had to rent two rooms until the construction on the Molitveni dom began in 1937, consecrated on 2 January 1938. The church grew in numbers until the 1950s, after which it gradually shrunk.

Also in 1932, Rudolf Strohal published a book about the history of the castle and village of Severin. It was republished in 2005.

In July 1936, Ivan Goran Kovačić and other HSS members and sympathisers founded Gospodarska sloga chapters in Severin and Lukovdol.

=== WWII ===
In May 1941, the Ustaša government began targeting known and suspected JRZ members with arrests. The only prominent JRZ member in Severin at the time was Matija Paviša.

In June 1941, the first generation graduated from the 8 grade elementary school in Severin. Of those to graduate during WWII, 24 returned for a reunion in 2010.

In July, when the deportations of Serbs to accommodate the Slovenes of the population exchange commenced, the logornik in Vrbovsko informed his superiors that all the Serbs were in Moravice, whereas the other općine had no Serbs, apart from two retired Serb gunmen in Severin. For the temporary accommodation of Slovenes, the castle in Severin was offered for the housing of 20 people, and the općinska zgrada for 15 people.

The Italians withdrew from Severin around 20 February 1942. The Italians did not leave those towns along the railway, which they fortified with barbed wire.

On 9 May, the 1st battalion of the Second Kordun Partisan Detachment unsuccessfully attacked the weapons depot in Severin, while a group of Serbs cut down about 50 poles in Močile and Draga Lukovdolska.

Around 7:00 on 19 June, a group of 18 Partisans halted and commandeered an automobile belonging to Matija Rački of Severin, who had been transporting passengers to Karlovac. They commanded the owner and passengers to return to their homes, and directed the driver to take them to Ponikve, where they let Rački go but kept the automobile for themselves.

Mara Severinski of Severin na Kupi was listed by SUBNOR as a victim of fascism. Milivoj Časni (Note: (1927-08-04 – 2011-02-14)) joined the Yugoslav Partisans, later becoming pastor of the Baptist church in Severin.

=== Federal period ===
On 6 June 1945, Vladimir Arko, the last owner of the castle, poisoned himself with a cyanide pill, according to one of his servants. According to Arko's lawyer Matija Paviša, Arko assisted the Yugoslav Partisans during the war and willed his estate to them, but the Communist administration of Zagreb had no knowledge of this and had other aims, so Arko committed suicide instead of falling into their hands. This version differs from that told by his last surviving servantess in Severin. Following his death, almost everything of value was looted from the castle in Severin: the paintings, the carpets, the furniture, the gilded bathroom armature, porcelain and silver dishes, medieval armour sets, silk cloth and so on. The most valuable was the collection of hunting weapons, some dating as far back as the Frankopan period.

In 1951, the DVD Severin na Kupi was founded, with the castle gatekeeper's house as their headquarters, in front of which the statue of Saint Florian, patron saint of firefighters, was moved. It was once in the terraced garden, where a female statue remains, headless. The DVD Severin na Kupi is under the VZ grada Vrbovsko. Its current commander is Jasmin Brozović.

In 1958-1959, the castle was renovated by the Šumarija Vrbovsko, and a plaque commemorating the renovation was fixed to the wall on the left of the door. As a result of this renovation, the castle was turned into a hotel. The northwest wing was turned into a modern kitchen. Another room on the ground floor became the disco ball. The rooms of the storey were given room numbers. The grounds were modified to include a fountain, and transforming the lowermost flat terrace from a soccer court into a tennis court.

By 1976, the castle was in the final phases of adaptation for use as a hotel.

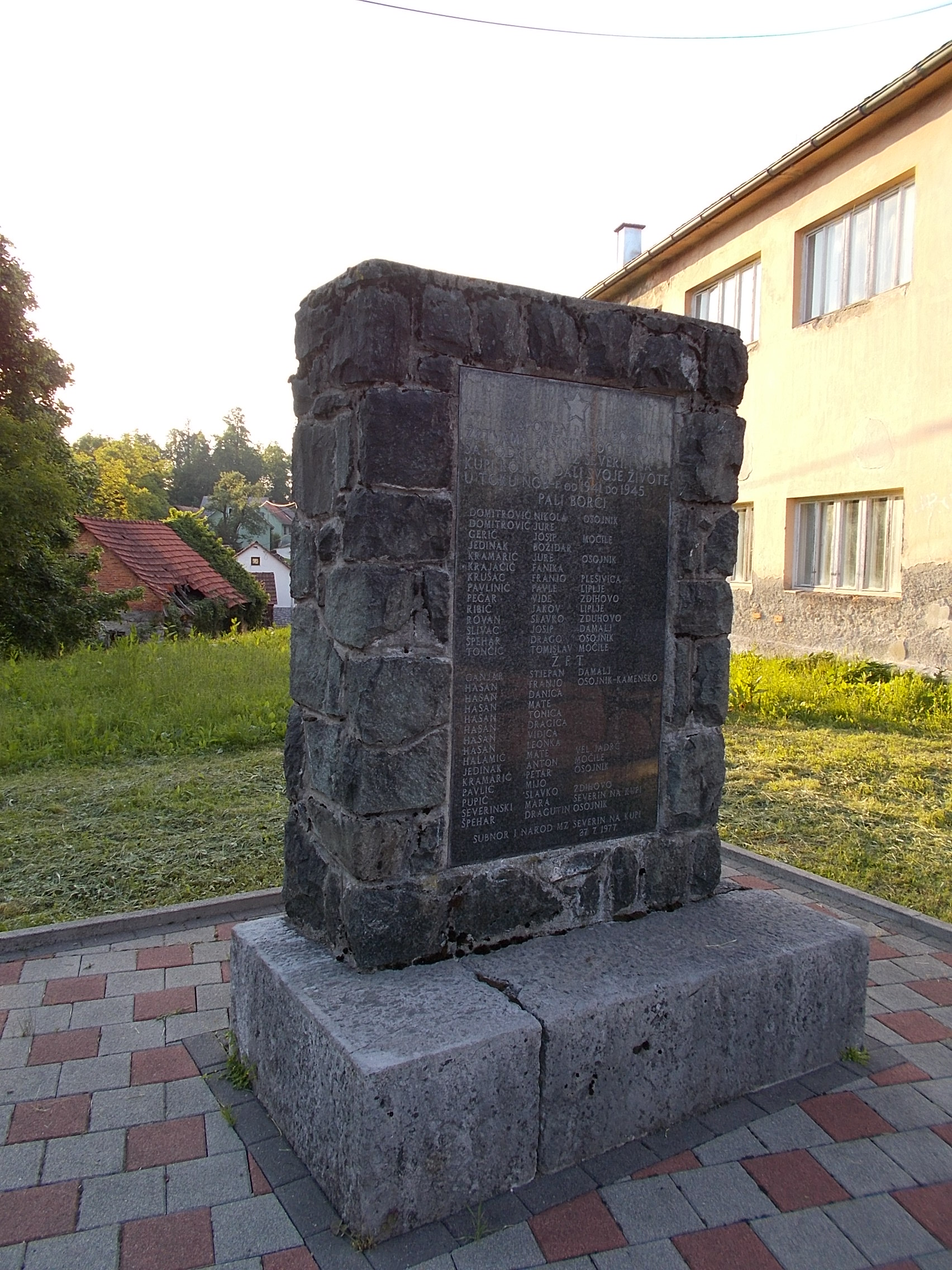
SUBNOR monument

On 27 July 1977, a monument commemorating the fallen of WWII in Severin and the surrounding villages was erected in the town square.

=== Recent ===
During the War in Croatia, resident Adam Muminović (Note: (1965-03-29 – 2023-04-18)) served in the Gromovi brigade.

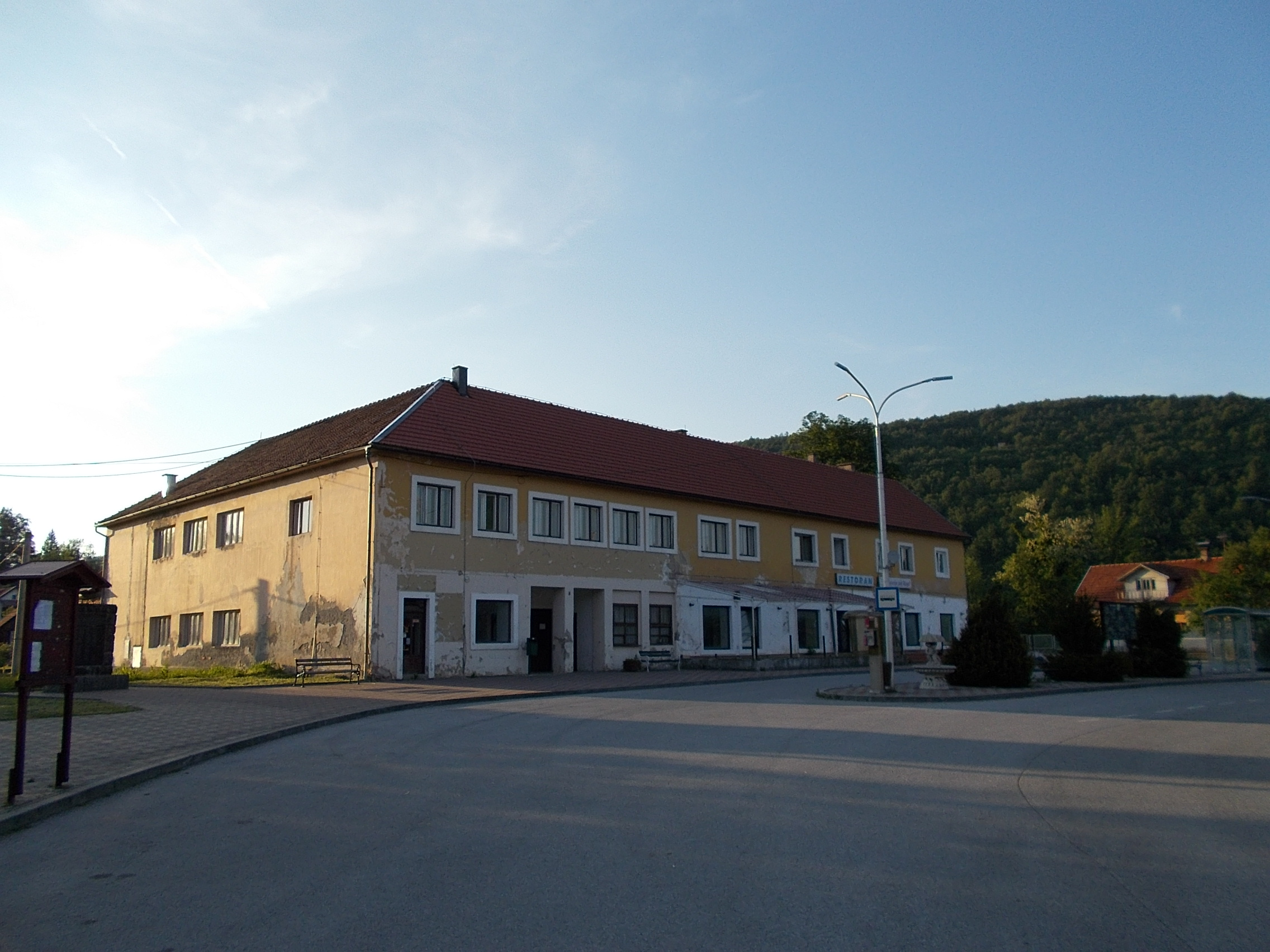
Town centre with "Risnjak"

Initially, it was thought the area might be a target of the JNA or SVK, and so HV troops were stationed in the castle. They overwintered in 1991–1992, burning books donated by the now-closed restaurant "Risnjak" and the administrative archive inside the castle to keep warm. The castle was looted of valuables and subsequently fell into disrepair, its windows barred up (though one on the ground floor of the northwest corner was opened for entry).

In 1999, the cultural arts society KUD Frankopan was founded in Severin na Kupi.

In 2001, as part of the privatization process, the castle was returned to the heirs of Vladimir Arko, but his heirs lacked the finances to repair the castle. In 2007, a court case awarded 94% ownership to the city of Vrbovsko, but litigation continued until the courts finally decided in favour of the city of Vrbovsko in 2012.

In September 2007, the annual folk festival "Severin Evenings" (Croatian: Severinske večeri) was founded on the initiative of Vesna Žagar and Mira Slivac. It was held annually almost every year since then: 2010, 2011, 2012, 2013, 2014 (indoors), 2015, 2016, 2017, 2023.

The month of August 2012 saw widespread tap water issues in Severin and the region. On the 11th, drought caused a loss of tap water in Severin, Draga Lukovdolska, Močile, Smišljak, Damalj, Klanac, Plešivica, Rim, Zdihovo and Liplje. Later on the 30th, a leak in Vrbovsko forced a water shutoff that affected Severin, among others.

Severin was hit by the 2014 Dinaric ice storm.

== Demographics ==
The first census to include Severin took place in 1750 and included the full name of the father, number of married sons and brothers, size and quality of land and description of livestock. Much data is available in the urbarijalna regulacija made 1774-1848, like HR-HDA-34. The first census of the newly created Severinska županija took place in 1779/1780. A census of the nobility now kept at the HDA was made in 1785/87. An extremely detailed conscription-oriented census followed in 1802. In 1828, there was a census including the full name of the father, number of houses, number of men and women, professions, age structure, size of land, number of livestock, faith and so on; the census is now in an archive in Hungary.

Census data after the abolition of the Severinska županija can be found under the Zagrebačka županija, and then the Riječka županija (1850-1861) and then the Zagrebačka županija again.

=== Municipality ===
Severin was the administrative seat of its own Severinski kotar, with an area of 265.8 square kilometres (102.6 mi^{2}) in 1869/1870. In 1811, the kotar had a population of 3629 in 26 villages.

In 1870, Severin općina had 606 houses and 4373 people. Its 28 villages were divided into 11 porezne obćine for taxation purposes: Severin, Rim, Jadrč Mali, Jadrč Veliki, Klanac, Lukovdol, Blaževci, Plemenitaš, Razdrto, Draga and Osojnik. Its parishes were Severin and Plemenitaš. Severin's porezna općina included Smišljak and Močile.

Religion in Severin Municipality (1890 census)
Religion	Percentage
Catholics	99.9%
Eastern Orthodox	0.07%
Protestants	0.02%

In 1890, the općina of Severin (court at Severin), with an area of 118 kilometres (73 mi), belonged to the kotar and electoral district of Vrbovsko (Vrbovsko court) in the županija of Modruš-Rieka (Ogulin court). There were 832 houses (916 in 1910), with a population of 4560: 1933 male and 2627 female; 3278 in 1910. The majority were Croatian or Serbian speakers, but 60 spoke Slovene, 24 German, 18 Hungarian, 2 Czech and 17 spoke other languages. The majority were Catholic, but 3 were Eastern Orthodox and 1 was Protestant. Its 28 villages and 7 hamlets (Note: Counted as 26 villages and 3 hamlets in 1910.) were divided for taxation purposes into 11 porezne općine (Blaževci, Draga, Jadrč Mali, Jadrč Veliki, Klanac, Lukovdol, Osojnik, Plemenitaš, Razdrto, Rim, Severin), under the Ogulin office.

In 1910, the općina had 6 resident soldiers. Militarily, Severin na Kupi fell under the 26th Landwehr Infantry Regiment and 26th Landsturm Infantry Brigade, both at Karlovac.

=== Village ===
As of 2021, it has a population of 113, but there were only 16 inhabitants under the age of 20.

Village of Severin na Kupi: Population trends 1857–2021
v

population	102	166	170	178	162	104	93	98	123	133	128	137	118	209	157	118	113
	1857	1869	1880	1890	1900	1910	1921	1931	1948	1953	1961	1971	1981	1991	2001	2011	2021

Note:Simply Severin until 1890. Sources: Croatian Bureau of Statistics publications

In 1828/1830, there were 96 residents in 10 families living in the Purga of Severin, and 85 residents in 9 families in Severin proper, all Catholic.

In 1870, Severin had 17 houses and 166 people.

In the 1880s, many residents of Severin emigrated to the United States of America.

In 1890, Severin itself had 16 houses and 120 people. The Purza had 11 houses and 58 people. Močile was also counted under Severin and had 72 houses and 387 people. They attended the school in and were taxed and administered by Severin, which also had a post office and a gendarmerie.

=== Further reading ===
- Kraljevski zemaljski statistički ured (1903). Političko i sudbeno razdieljenje i Repertorij prebivališta Kraljevina Hrvatske i Slavonije po stanju od 1. travnja 1903. Zagreb: Kraljevska hrvatsko-slavonsko-dalmatinska zemaljska vlada, 🖶 Kraljevska zemaljska tiskara.
- Kraljevski zemaljski statistički ured (May 1913). "Repertorij prebivališta po županijama, upravnim kotarima, gradovima, upravnim i poreznim općinama". Političko i sudbeno razdjeljenje i Repertorij prebivališta Kraljevina Hrvatske i Slavonije po stanju od 1. siječnja 1913. Zagreb: Kraljevska hrvatsko-slavonsko-dalmatinska zemaljska vlada, 🖶 Kraljevska zemaljska tiskara. pp. 1–126. Page 33.

=== Prosopography ===
The Gorica hamlet is home to one of the few Baptist graveyards in the country, with about 40 burials as of 2024, including part of the family of Ivan Goran Kovačić. Families with members buried there include: Brozović, Časni, Despot, Fabac, Gašparović, Gerić, Kasun, Klobučarić, Kovačić, Kuretić, Lukanić, MacKenzie, Muminović, Pavišić, Pavlinac, Perše, Pupić, Rožman, Samardžić, Sečen, Severinski, Štajduhar, Tkalčević, Vrbanac, Vučetić and Žagar.

== Religion ==
Ecclesiastically, Severin falls under the parish of Lukovdol.

== Dialect ==
Already Rudolf Strohal in his 1932 monograph noticed similarities between the Kajkavian dialect of Severin and that of Brod na Kupi. He proposed the pre-Turkish inhabitants had spoken a Chakavian dialect. This has been disputed.

Dialect levelling is active, and preservation efforts are sporadic. Beginning in 2022, a dialectal competition and literature festival for children was introduced, Goranski Cukrac, to be held annually throughout Gorski Kotar for the purpose of motivation and practice. It was held again in 2023, with Severin winning the competition.

== Economy ==
Before the Lujzijana was built, the region had a farming economy. After, it was supplemented with forestry, while commercial trades increased in frequency. In the Federal period, the longstanding emigration began to have economic repercussions, followed by economic collapse with the political collapse of the Federation. The opening of the A6 in 2004-2008 resulted in a sudden decrease in traffic to Severin and the other towns and villages along the D3. Many restaurants and stores, apartments and lodges and other establishments closed down. The once busy bus stop lost most of its traffic, and was eventually restricted to a single regular line on the weekends and the occasional tourist bus. There have been attempts to revive certain agricultural practices, but few on a commercial scale.

== Governance ==
=== National ===
Representatives of the Severinski kotar (Note: Ribničko-severinski in 1865. Severinsko-ribničko-ozaljski in 1867.) at the Croatian Parliament:

- ? (1848)
- Radoslav Lopašić (1861)
- Eduard Vrbančić (1861), NS
- Vinko Milić (1865)
- Miho Klaić (1865–1867)
- Josip Torbar (1867–1871), NLS
- Josip Tomašević (1868), NUS
- Emanuel Vranjican (1872–1875)
- Mato Sladović (1875–1881), NLS

The Severinsko-ribničko-ozaljski electoral kotar introduced by Ban Levin Rauch on 25 November during the 1867 Croatian parliamentary election in the midst of campaigns contested by the NUS and the NLS in late 1867 combined the kotars of Severin, Ribnik and Ozalj in a gerrymandering move Levin Rauch strongly criticised by NLS mouthpiece Novi Pozor, because the new combined electoral kotar had 35,127 citizens in contrast to, for example, the 11,246 of Bistra. Only the new Jastrebarsko-banijansko-krasički kotar came close in population. In the electoral district, marked by agitation from Rauch in Lukovdol and elsewhere, the NUS candidate was Josip Tomašić and the NLS candidates were Emanuel Vranjican and postal worker Mato Sladović. The NLS candidates had an agreement to yield to the stronger candidate before the election. Among other issues, the NLS campaign emphasised the attempts by the governing party to introduce the Hungarian language education in schools and churches. The NUS did not believe they could win the election fairly and instead resorted to intimidation and bribery, offering as much as 10 to 20 forint per vote. Josip Bunjevac sent from NUS dignitaries began issuing threats after arriving in the electoral kotar 14 days before the election, firing 2 state employees before the election. Before the election, both Vranjican an Sladović dropped out, having been deemed too upper class for the promises of their party, replaced with Josip Torbar, who was simultaneously running for Jastrebarsko-banijansko-krasički kotar. The elections were held on the 23rd, with 102 electors on the record. Torbar was elected, thanks to the fact that many who had promised to vote for Tomašić voted for Torbar anyway.

Thanks to the NLS leaving the Sabor, the 1868 Croatian parliamentary by-election had to be held. The by-election for Severinsko-ribničko-ozaljski kotar was postponed to 29 February by Tomašić, now president of the electoral deputation, on the order of the Central Electoral Committee of Zagreb County. In the election, Josip Torbar was re-elected.

At the 1920 Kingdom of Serbs, Croats and Slovenes Constitutional Assembly election in Modruš-Rijeka County, Severin voted mainly for the Croatian People's Peasant Party and to a lesser extent the Communist Party.

Results at the poll in Severin
Year	Voters	Electors	NRS	JRSD →JNS	DSD →DS	KPJ	NRPJ	HPSS →HRSS →HSS	SS →ZS	Independent	HSP	HZ →JZ	HPS	ZBOR
1920	798	515	0	N/A	5	101	N/A	387	7	3	1	11	N/A	N/A
1923	636	?	0	N/A	2	banned	12	620	N/A	N/A	N/A	2	0	N/A
...														
1935	772	681	N/A	43	N/A	banned	N/A	638		0 (Note: Božidar Maksimović)	N/A	N/A	N/A	0

=== Local ===
As of its foundation in 2006, it is the seat of a local committee encompassing Močile, Smišljak, Liplje, Zdihovo, Klanac, Damalj, Rim and Plešivica.

Presidents of local committee:

- Zvonko Osojnički (2008 — 2009)
- Vojin Božović (2009 — 2020), HSU
- Janko Filipčić (2020), interim president
- Denis Barković (2020 — 2021), Independent (Mufić-aligned)
- Dubravko Osojnički (2021 —), HDZ

In 2020, the option of dividing Vrbovsko into 4 municipalities (Croatian: općine) was being considered, one being Severin na Kupi/Lukovdol.

=== Judiciary ===
Karlovac was once the seat of the kotar court for an 1870 population of 53,148. In 1875, the kotar court of Karlovac was responsible for the općine: Karlovac city, Banija, Rečica, Draganić, Ozalj, Novigrad, Ribnik, Bosiljevo and Severin.

== Notable people ==
Notable people that were born or lived in Severin include:

- Vladimir Dvorniković
- Vuk II Krsto Frankopan

== Sports ==
Beginning in 2013, the 7 stage 260 kilometres (160 mi) long Cycling Trail of Gorski Kotar (Croatian: Goranska biciklistička transverzala) passes through Severin na Kupi, where the third stage ends.

== Attractions ==
=== Castle ===
Despite officially being closed, tourists often come to explore it inside and outside, along with the Sv. Florijana chapel.

=== Nature ===
Selaginella helvetica, very rare this far south, has been found on the rocks of the bank of the Kupa near Severin. Other species include: Cymbalaria muralis.

The 7 hectares (17 acres) terraced garden of the castle dates to the renovation under grof Ivan Oršić in 1803 and later. It was protected by law in 1966. The paths were first recorded on the 1862 cadastre, and some of the trees still stand. The old Vranjican garden was visible from a far thanks to its tall Populus nigra trees, which were cut down later on, (Note: No earlier than 1895.) replaced with purple Fagus sylvatica. Apart from several Taxus baccata individuals, a very old, hollow Tilia platyphyllos next to a stone table, and possibly one of its children at the western corner of the walled area, survive. Newer additions are mostly North American species, including very tall Chamaecyparis lawsoniana trees, severely affected by Sitta europaea and Dendrocopus major, as well as Pinus strobus, Quercus rubra, Thuja occidentalis. Near the castle are rows of Ilex aquifolium and Aesculus hippocastanum. The Ulmus and Buxus sempervirens trees on the south side have been severely affected by DED (Note: Since the 1930s.) and Cydalima perspectalis, (Note: Since 2014.) respectively.

The 11,700 square metres (126,000 ft^{2}) school garden was started in the second half of the 20th century and remains unprotected.

=== Events ===
An annual Christmas concert is organised by the local KUD Frankopan, for example, in 2010, 2012, 2014, 2023.

On 9 July 2023, the castle garden hosted the medieval festival "Walking the Paths of Frankopan History" (Croatian: Šetnja putevima frankopanske prošlosti), organised by the Putovima Frankopana initiative.

== Sports ==
The "Gorski Kotar Bike Tour", held annually since 2012, sometimes goes through Severin, such as in the first leg for 2024.

== Infrastructure ==
The water storage unit between Severin na Kupi and Damalj, with a capacity of 180 cubic metres (6,400 ft^{3}) at an elevation of 266 metres (873 ft), is responsible for Draga Lukovdolska, Močile, Smišljak, Klanac, Plešivica, Rim, Zdihovo and Liplje. The water pumping station Klanac affects the water storage units in Severin and Gornji Kalanji. This pipe system was reconstructed and sanitised in 2024.

Severin has a post office, a defunct infirmary, and partial elementary school "Ivana Gorana Kovačića", an Udaljeni pretplatnički stupanj (UPS), restaurants and lodgings. It also had an općinski ured, which at one point served as the office of the mjesni odbor. There was also a butchery adjacent to the castle.

In 1913, there were 2 gendarmeries in Vrbovsko kotar: Vrbovsko and Severin na Kupi.

== Popular culture ==
Ivan Goran Kovačić wrote a novella about the castle centred around class differences.

In 2020, the castle in Severin was used along with that in Stara Sušica and the Gomirje Monastery as a filming location for the music video of the županija anthem.

The castle was used as a filming location together with the Stara Sušica castle by Marko Kutlić for his 2021 national hit Budi moja noć.

== Selected works ==
- Časni, Rudolf (2008). 75 godina Kršćanske baptističke crkve u Severinu na Kupi, 1933. – 2008 [75 Years of the Christian Baptist Church in Severin na Kupi, 1933–2008] (in Croatian).
- Strohal, Rudolf (1935). "Selo Severin" (PDF). Uz Lujzinsku cestu [Along the Louisiana Road] (in Croatian). Zagreb: 🖶 Tisak "Tipografije". pp. 88–95. Archived from the original on 2019-04-17. Reprinted 1993 with ISBN 953-158-000-6, 2005 with ISBN 953-99903-1-9.
- Strohal, Rudolf (1932). Grad i selo Severin u Gorskom Kotaru na Kupi [The Castle and Village of Severin in Gorski Kotar on the Kupa] (in Croatian). Zagreb: Jugoslovenska štampa. Reprinted 2005 with ISBN 953-99903-2-7.
- Lopašić, Radoslav (1895). "Severin". In Laszowski, Emilij (ed.). Oko Kupe i Korane: mjestopisne i povjestne crtice [Around the Kupa and the Korana: Geographic and Historical Outlines] (in Croatian). Zagreb: Matica hrvatska, 🖶 Karl Albrecht. pp. 249–257.

== Gallery ==
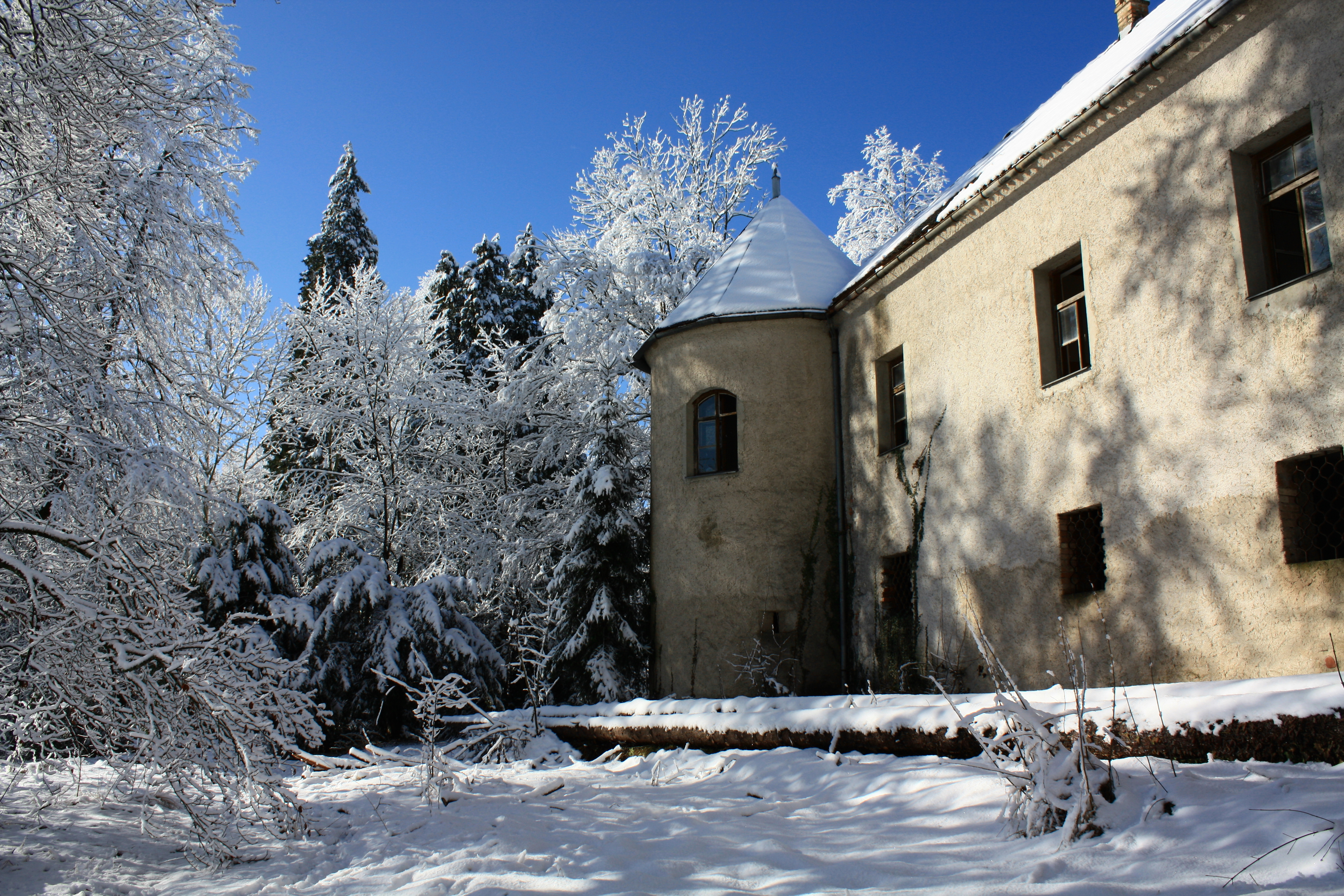
Castle in winter

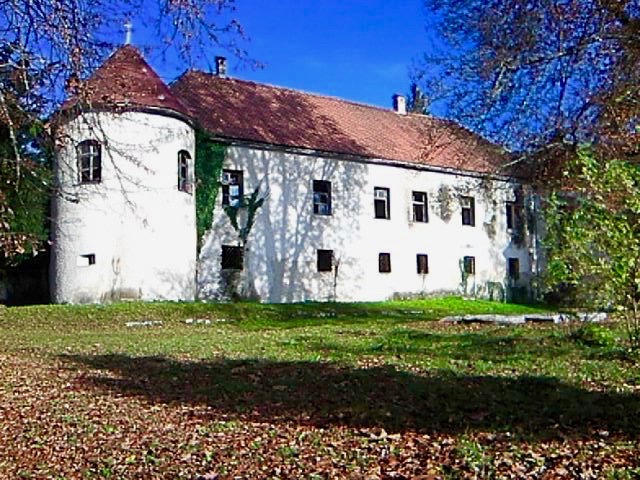
Castle from south

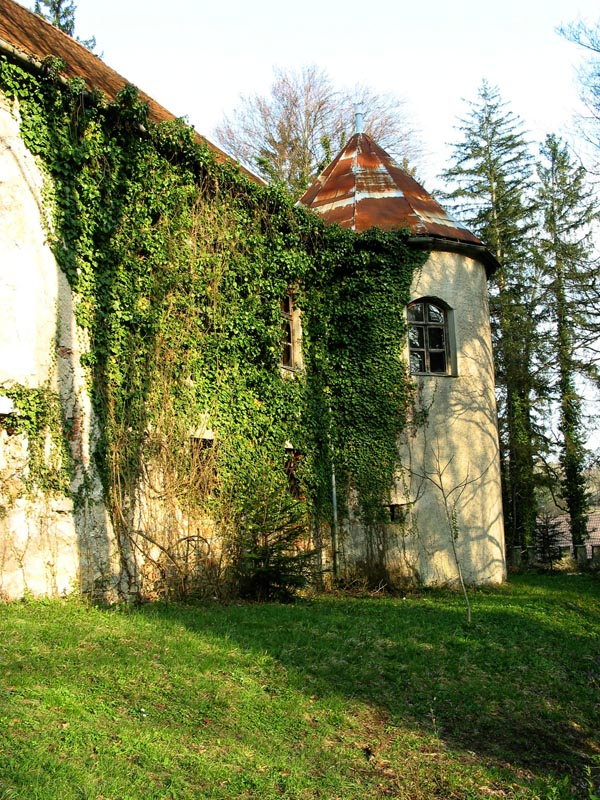
Castle from west

== Bibliography ==
- Rajnović, Sara (2023-11-06) [defended 2023-10-31]. Turistička valorizacija prostornih resursa Gorskog kotara [Tourism valorization of spatial resources of Gorski kotar] (Thesis) (in Serbo-Croatian). Zadar: Sveučilište u Zadru.
- Žgela, Ivona (2023-09-11) [defended 2023-09-20]. Izazovi ruralnog turizma Gorskog kotara [Challenges of rural tourism in Gorski kotar] (Thesis) (in Serbo-Croatian). Rijeka: Sveučilište u Rijeci.
- Melem Hajdarović, Mihela (2023-06-14). "Glavačeva karta Hrvatske iz 1673. – njezini toponimi, geografski sadržaj i historijskogeografski kontekst" [Glavač’s map of Croatia from 1673: Its toponyms, geographical content, and historical-geographical context]. Studia lexicographica. 17 (32): 47–78. doi:10.33604/sl.17.32.2. eISSN 2459-5578.
- Grad Vrbovsko (2021b). "Fast Food Nina". Visit Vrbovsko. Archived from the original on 2021-04-17.
- Regan, Krešimir (2016). "Barunska obitelj Vranyczany-Dobrinović i plemićka obitelj Vranyczany: Prilog poznavanju rodoslova plemićkog roda Dobrinović" (PDF). Veličanstveni Vranyczanyjevi: Umjetnički, povijesni i politički okvir života jedne plemićke obitelji (in Croatian). Zagreb: Matica hrvatska. pp. 10–51. ISBN 978-953-341-068-5. Archived from the original (PDF) on 2020-01-14.
- n.s. (1938). "Srez Vrbovski (Vrbovsko)". Статистика избора народних посланика за Народну скупштину Краљевине Југославије извршених 5 маја 1935 године (in Serbian). Народна Скупштина Краљевине Југославије. p. 26.
- Костић, Лаза М., ed. (1924). "Табела IV. — Резултати избора (по гласачким местима) 43: Изборни округ Модрушко-Ријечки са Крком и Каставом". Статистика избора народних посланика Краљевине Срба, Хрвата i Словенаца одржаних 18 марта 1923. године (in Serbian). Народна Скупштина Краљевине Срба, Хрвата и Словенаца. pp. 106–108.
