= Kasun =

Kasun may refer to:

- Kasun (Sri Lankan name)
- Kasun (Croatian surname)
- Ali Kasun, a village in Syria
- Kasun Eljabal, a village in Syria
