= Non-partisan democracy =

Type of democratic government

Non-partisan democracy (also no-party democracy) is a system of representative government or organization such that universal and periodic elections take place without reference to political parties. Sometimes electioneering and even speaking about candidates may be discouraged, so as not to prejudice others' decisions or create a contentious atmosphere.

In many nations, the head of state is nonpartisan, even if the prime minister and parliament are chosen in partisan elections. Such heads of state are expected to remain neutral with regard to partisan politics. In a number of parliamentary or semi-presidential countries, some presidents are non-partisan, or receive cross-party support.

Nonpartisan systems may be de jure, meaning political parties are either outlawed entirely or legally prevented from participating in elections at certain levels of government, or de facto if no such laws exist and yet there are no political parties.

De facto nonpartisan systems are mostly situated in states and regions with small populations, such as in Micronesia, Tuvalu, and Palau, where organizing political parties is seen as unnecessary or impractical.

De jure nonpartisan systems exist in several Persian Gulf states, including Oman and Kuwait; the legislatures in these governments typically have advisory capacity only, as they may comment on laws proposed by the executive branch but are unable to create laws themselves. De jure nonpartisan national governments sometimes resemble one-party states, but governments of the latter type explicitly recognize a single political party of which all officials are required to be a member.

Unless there are legal restrictions on political parties, factions within nonpartisan governments may evolve into political parties. The United States initially did not have enfranchised political parties, but these evolved soon after independence.

== Comparison with other political systems ==
A nonpartisan system differs from a one-party system in that the governing faction in a one-party system identifies itself as a party, where membership might provide benefits not available to non-members. A single-party government often requires government officials to be members of the party, features a complex party hierarchy as a key institution of government, forces citizens to agree to a partisan ideology, and may enforce its control over the government by making all other parties illegal. Members of a nonpartisan government may represent many different ideologies. Various communist nations such as China or Cuba are single-party nations although the Members of Parliament are not elected as party candidates.

A direct democracy can be considered nonpartisan since citizens vote on laws themselves rather than electing representatives. Direct democracy can be partisan, however, if factions are given rights or prerogatives that non-members do not have.

== Structures ==
=== Elections ===
In nonpartisan elections, each candidate for office is eligible based on their own merits rather than as a member of a political party. No political affiliation (if one exists) is shown on the ballot next to a candidate. Generally, the winner is chosen from a runoff election where the candidates are the top two vote-getters from a primary election. In some elections the candidates might be members of a national party but do not run as party members for local office.

Nonpartisan elections are generally held for municipal and county offices, especially school boards, and are also common in the election of judges. In some nonpartisan elections it is common knowledge which candidates are members of and backed by which parties; in others, parties are almost wholly uninvolved and voters make choices with little or no regard to partisan considerations.

While nonpartisan democracies can allow for a wide selection of candidates (especially within a no-nomination system whereby voters can choose any non-restricted person in their area), such systems are compatible with indirect elections (such as for large geographical areas), whereby delegates may be chosen who in turn elect the representatives.

=== Appointments ===
Even if a government's executive officer or legislature is partisan, appointments of cabinet members, judges, or directors of government agencies, may be nonpartisan. The intent of appointing government officials in a nonpartisan manner is to insure the officers can perform their duties free from partisan politics, and are chosen in a fair manner that does not adversely affect a political party. Twelve US states use the Missouri Plan, and two use a variation of it, to choose judges in a nonpartisan manner. Several countries with partisan parliaments use nonpartisan appointments to choose presidents.

=== Legislatures ===
In nonpartisan legislatures, there are no typically formal party alignments within the legislature; even if there are caucuses for specific issues. Alliances and caucuses with a nonpartisan body are often temporary and fluid since legislators who oppose each other on some issues may agree on other issues. Despite being nonpartisan, legislators typically have consistent and identifiable voting patterns. Decisions to investigate and enforce ethics violations by government officials are generally done on the basis of evidence instead of party affiliation. Committee chairs and other leaders within the legislature are often chosen for seniority and expertise, unlike the leaders in a partisan legislature who are often chosen because of loyalty to a party.

== Historical examples ==
Democracy in ancient Athens was nonpartisan, as eligible citizens voted on laws themselves rather than electing representatives.

Elections to offices in the Roman Republic were all nonpartisan, though the informal factions of the Populares and Optimates did emerge within the Roman Senate.

=== United States ===
Historians have frequently interpreted Federalist No. 10 to imply that the Founding Fathers of the United States intended the government to be nonpartisan. James Madison defined a faction as "a number of citizens, whether amounting to a minority or majority of the whole, who are united and actuated by some common impulse of passion, or of interest, adverse to the rights of other citizens, or to the permanent and aggregate interests of the community." As political parties had interests which were adverse to the rights of citizens and to the general welfare of the nation, several Founding Fathers preferred a nonpartisan form of government.

The administration of George Washington and the first few sessions of the US Congress were nonpartisan. Factions within the early US government coalesced into the Federalist and Democratic-Republican parties. The Era of Good Feelings, when the Federalist party collapsed (leaving the Democratic-Republican party as the sole political faction) was the United States' only experience with a one-party system.

The Confederate States of America had no political parties during its entire existence from 1861 to 1865. Despite political differences within the Confederacy, no national political parties were formed because they were seen as illegitimate. "Anti-partyism became an article of political faith." Without a two-party system building alternative sets of national leaders, electoral protests tended to be narrowly state-based, "negative, carping and petty". The 1863 mid-term elections became mere expressions of futile and frustrated dissatisfaction. According to historian David M. Potter, this lack of a functioning two-party system caused "real and direct damage" to the Confederate war effort, since it prevented the formulation of any effective alternatives to the conduct of the war by the Davis administration.

Legislative elections in the Confederacy were decided without political parties. Key candidate identification related to adopting secession before or after Lincoln's call for volunteers to retake Federal property. Previous party affiliation played a part in voter selection, predominantly secessionist Democrat or unionist Whig. There were no organized political parties, but elective offices were exempted from military duty. Virtually every position was contested with as many as twenty candidates for each office. The absence of political parties made individual roll call voting all the more important, as the Confederate "freedom of roll-call voting [was] unprecedented in American legislative history.

The Republic of Texas was a nonpartisan democracy before it was annexed by the United States; all four presidents of the Republic of Texas, and the members of the Texian Congress, were officially non-partisan.

=== New Zealand ===
From 1853 to 1890, within the Self-governing colony of New Zealand, Members of Parliament were not organised into any formal political parties. Prime Ministers made individual agreements with Members of Parliament in order to form and maintain government, lest MP's 'cross the floor' and joined the opposition.

=== Canada ===
The Non-Partisan League was an influential socialist political movement during the 1910s and 1920s in the United States, especially in the Upper Midwest, which also eventually bled over into the prairie provinces of Canada.

The League contributed much to the ideology of the former Progressive Party of Canada. It went into decline and merged with the Democratic Party of North Dakota in 1956. The Progressive Party of Canada and the United Farmers movement (which formed governments in the provinces of Alberta, Manitoba and Ontario) also acted on a similar philosophy. In the case of the United Farmers of Ontario, while in power (1919–1923), the administration of Ernest Drury suffered much infighting as the result of conflicting views.

Because of their nonpartisan ideology, the Progressive Party of Canada refused to take the position of the official opposition after the election of 1921 when they came in second place. Four years later, they lost that position and their rural supporters began to move to the Liberal Party and CCF. Eventually the Progressive Party of Canada and the United Farmers movement faded into obscurity, with most of their members joining the Liberal Party of Canada and the democratic socialist Co-operative Commonwealth Federation (CCF, or present day New Democratic Party).

== Modern examples ==
=== National governments ===
Very few national governments are completely nonpartisan, but nonpartisan political systems at the national level are not unheard of, especially in states with small populations. Many national governments have nonpartisan offices even if their legislative branches are partisan. Constitutional monarchies have nonpartisan monarchs as their head of state. Parliamentary republics generally have nonpartisan, figurehead presidents.

==== Pacific Islands nations ====
Nonpartisan governments are much more likely in countries with small populations. Nauru, for example, has no political parties; its Parliament consists entirely of independent members of parliament or MPs, who form governing coalitions and opposition blocs through alliances of individuals.

In Niue, political parties have never played an important role. There is, at present, no political party, and candidates to elections therefore run as independents. The only party ever to have existed, the Niue People's Party, disbanded in 2003.

In Tuvalu, where no political parties exist, "MPs have very close links with their island constituencies and effort is directed towards balancing island representation in Cabinet".

Other nonpartisan island nations are the Pitcairn Islands, Micronesia, and Palau. These nations have small, highly dispersed populations.

Some states are de facto nonpartisan because while no law forbids the formation of political parties, the populations are small enough that they are considered impractical. Political allegiances depend mainly on family and island-related factors.

==== Muslim-majority countries ====
In Indonesia, all members of the Regional Representative Council, the upper house of the nation's bicameral legislature, are barred to come from any elements of political parties.

The United Arab Emirates is a de jure nonpartisan authoritarian state since all political parties were outlawed. The Federal National Council is the UAE's parliamentary body and consists of 40 members, representing the Emirates, half appointed by the rulers of the constituent states and the other half elected to serve two-year terms, with only advisory tasks.

Kazakhstan's presidency and Senate are formally nonpartisan: the president may not hold party membership while in office, and Senate deputies are elected or appointed without party affiliation, though most lower-chamber and local legislative seats remain dominated by political parties.

Political parties are also formally illegal in the Gulf state of Kuwait, as they have not been legalized since independence in 1961. Nonetheless, the constitution itself does not explicitly prohibit parties. Candidates for election to the National Assembly of Kuwait stand in a personal capacity. Nevertheless, several politically-focused organizations such as the National Democratic Alliance exist and function as de facto political parties.

Libya's unicameral legislature, the General National Congress reserved 120 out of its 200 seats for independent politicians in multiple-member districts. The other 80 were elected through a party list system of proportional representation.

Oman does not allow political parties, and only holds elections with expanding suffrage for a consultative assembly. Though Oman is developing into a constitutional monarchy, political parties are presently forbidden in Oman. The previously influential opposition movement, the Popular Front for the Liberation of Oman, is dormant today.

In Saudi Arabia, there are neither national elections or legal political parties. Despite this, some opposition movements exist, with varying degrees of presence in Saudi Arabia and abroad.

==== Other nations ====
The Vatican State is a nonpartisan theocracy, though it does not have a native population and in essence exists as a sort of extraterritorial headquarters for the Catholic Church.

A nonpartisan democracy might take root in other sovereign nations, such as occurred in Uganda in 1986, whereby political parties were restricted by a constitutional referendum endorsed by the people of the country (this system did not have all of the features described above). During a subsequent referendum in 2005, over 92% of Ugandan citizens voted for the return of a multiple party system.

Until the mid-20th century, a Canadian politician's political affiliation was not shown on ballots at any level of government. The expectation was that citizens would vote according to the merit of the candidate, but in practice, party allegiance played an important role. Beginning in 1974, the name of the candidate's political party was shown on the ballot.

In elections for the Legislative Council of Hong Kong, political affiliation was not shown on ballots until 2004. For elections for the eighteen districts in the dependency, political affiliation was not shown until 2007.

=== State or provincial governments ===
There are several examples of nonpartisan state or provincial governments. The nonpartisan system is also used in many US states for the election of judges, district attorneys and other officials. Twelve US states use the Missouri Plan, and two use a variation of it, to choose judges in a nonpartisan manner.

The state of Nebraska in the United States has nonpartisan elections for its legislature because candidates are neither endorsed nor supported by political parties. However, its executive branch is elected on a partisan basis. It is the only state in the United States with a nonpartisan legislature.

Louisiana uses a nonpartisan blanket primary, also called a "jungle primary", for state and local offices. In this system, all candidates run against each other regardless of party affiliation during the primary, and then the two most popular candidates run against each other even if they are members of the same party. This form of runoff election weakens political parties and transforms a partisan election into a partly nonpartisan election.

The Swiss Cantons of Glarus and Appenzell Innerrhoden are also nonpartisan, direct democracies; while they have a partisan parliament, all laws have to be passed by "Landsgemeinde", an assembly of all citizens eligible to vote.

Governors of Japanese prefectures are required by law not to be members of any political party.

=== Territorial governments ===
The territorial government of American Samoa is completely nonpartisan. It has 21 nonpartisan members elected by consensus to its Territorial House and 18 nonpartisan members elected to the Territorial Senate. The Governor and Lieutenant Governor are both nonpartisan offices. However, the Governor, Lieutenant Governor, and its nonvoting member of the U.S. House are Democrats.

The British territory of Falkland Islands has a completely nonpartisan government in that no political parties operate on the islands. All eight members of the Legislative Assembly are nonpartisan, as is the Chief Executive and the Governor.

Guernsey has a nonpartisan legislature. The States of Guernsey, officially called the States of Deliberation, consists of 45 People's Deputies, elected from multi- or single-member districts every four years.

Political parties played no official role in the Isle of Man before the 2006 elections and played a minor role in the 2006 elections. At the 2001 election for the House of Keys, the Manx Labour Party polled 17.3% of the vote and only 2 seats. The vast majority of seats at every election are won by independent candidates with no allegiance to any parties. However, several parties such as the Manx Labour Party and Liberal Vannin operate and hold a small number of elected officers.

Saint Helena, along with both Ascension Island and Tristan da Cunha, does not have any active political parties, but no law forbids the formation of political parties; hence, the territory is a de facto non-partisan democracy. The Saint Helena Labour Party and Saint Helena Progressive Party existed until 1976.

The head of the territory and head of government of Hong Kong, the Chief Executive, is required by law not to be member of any political party. There are numerous political parties, but there is no legislation for political parties. Civil society organizations and trade unions also nominate candidates for election in Hong Kong under the system of functional constituencies.

The Canadian territories of the Northwest Territories and Nunavut have nonpartisan legislatures. The populace votes for individuals to represent it in the territorial assembly without reference to political parties. After the election, the assembly selects one of its number to form a government and act as premier. This system is in deference to the system of consensus government that predominates among the indigenous Inuit and other peoples of northern Canada.

=== Municipal governments ===
==== Canada ====
Unique among democratic nations with partisan elections at the federal level, almost all Canadian cities and counties (and similar levels of supralocal government) have governments elected on a nonpartisan basis. The municipal government of the City of Toronto, Ontario (Canada) is the fifth largest government in the country, governing a population of more than 2.7 million. It consists of a nonpartisan, directly elected council. The public may have a general idea of the candidates' political affiliations, but their parties have no official recognition or privilege in the functioning of City Council. Councilors are free to vote on each motion individually, not bound by party discipline.

==== Switzerland ====
Many municipalities in Switzerland also have a nonpartisan legislative assembly consisting of all citizens eligible to vote.

==== Scarsdale, New York ====
The Village of Scarsdale, New York selects its Board of Trustees using a nonpartisan system that dates back to 1911. Candidates for office are privately interviewed by a diversely composed committee and then nominated for office. New York State law mandates that these nominees must be democratically elected, however, nominated candidates are rarely contested in the general election. The coordinating Scarsdale Citizens' Non-Partisan Party motto is "Performance, Not Politics".

==== Philippines ====
In the Philippines, barangay elections (elections for positions in the barangay or village) are nonpartisan. The certificates of candidacies, which the candidates sign under oath, say that they are not a member of any political party. The nonpartisanism of barangay elections have been challenged lately, though, as some candidates are members of political parties.

Barangay Captains and Sangguniang Kabataan (SK, youth councils) chairmen in a municipality or city elect among themselves their representative to the local legislature. In deadlocked or hung legislatures, votes from the nominally nonpartisan representatives of barangay captains and SK chairmen hold the balance of power.

== Religious perspectives ==
The Baháʼí Faith states that the partisan apparatus is not a necessary or beneficial aspect of democracy.

== Discrimination of non-partisan candidates in partisan democracies ==
In French parliament non-partisans are known as "non-inscrits" (unrecorded ones), and in some parliamentary talks they are given less time to speak.

== See also ==
- Consensus government
- List of countries without political parties
- Nonpartisanism
- New world order (Baháʼí)
- Types of democracy
- Independent politician
