= Jadrč =

Jadrč (historically spelled Idets) may refer to:

- Mali Jadrč, a village in Croatia
- Veliki Jadrč a village in Croatia
