= 1976 Saint Helena general election =

General elections were held in Saint Helena in September 1976. They were the only elections on the island to have been contested by political parties, with the Saint Helena Progressive Party winning eleven of the twelve seats in the Legislative Council. The Saint Helena Labour Party had seen its leader Tony Thornton expelled from the island shortly before the election, and failed to win a seat.

== Background ==
After the 1972 elections, the Progressive Party was established the following year by eleven of the twelve elected members. The Labour Party was formed in 1974. The Labour Party called for St Helenians living in Ascension Island to be able to vote.

== Results ==
Four seats were uncontested.

| Party | Seats |
|---|---|
| Saint Helena Progressive Party | 11 |
| Saint Helena Labour Party | 0 |
| Independents | 1 |
| Total | 12 |
Source: Saint Helena Island

== Aftermath ==
Both parties became inactive after the election.
