= Severin, Croatia =

Severin is the name of two villages in Croatia:

- Severin, Bjelovar-Bilogora County (HR-43274)
- Severin na Kupi in Primorje-Gorski Kotar County (HR-51329)
