= Kamačnik =

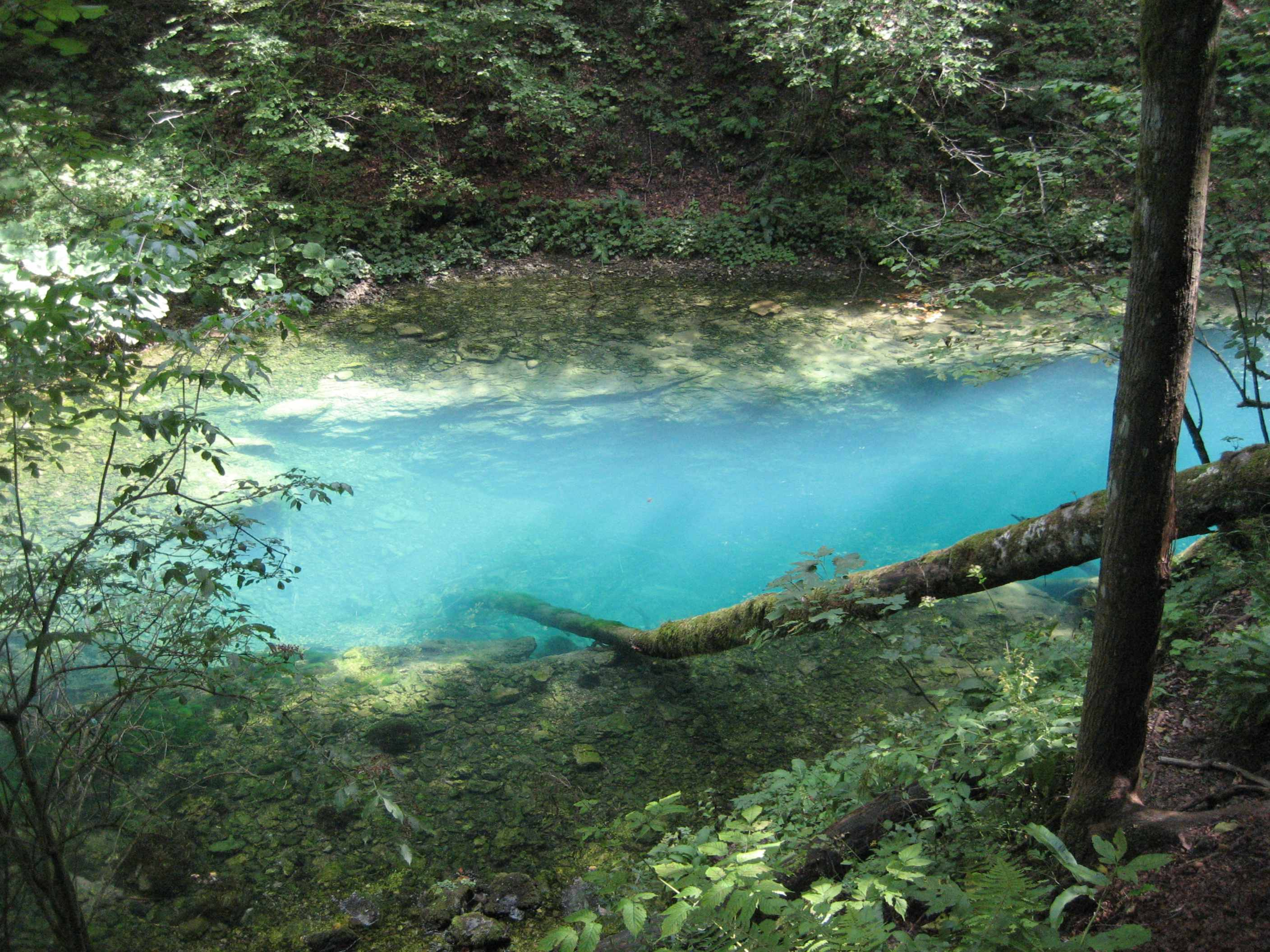
- Source

- Location within Croatia

Location
- Countries: Croatia

Physical characteristics
- Source
  - location: Vujnovići
  - coordinates: 45.344811°N 15.059600°E
  - elevation: 405.4 m (1,330 ft)
- Mouth
  - location: Vrbovsko
  - coordinates: 45.367581°N 15.072131°E
- Length: 2.95 km (1.83 mi)

Basin features
- Progression: Dobra→ Kupa→ Sava→ Danube→ Black Sea

Kamačnik is a right tributary of the Dobra that runs through a canyon covered in dense beech forest. It is a major local tourist attraction, and canyon gained legal protection in 2002 in the Primorje-Gorski Kotar County. (Note: By decision of the County Assembly, published in the Službene novine Primorsko-goranske županije issue 23/2002.)

The 3 kilometres (1.9 mi) tourist path along the Kamačnik river was made in the second half of the 20th century, commissioned by the Tourist Society (Croatian: Turističko društvo). The path winds back and forth from one bank to the other over a series of wooden bridges all the way to the source at a Vauclusian spring.

At the beginning of the 20th century, a sawmill was built near the mouth of the canyon, but it was in ruins by the time the park was declared in 2002.

The freezing rain of February 2014 left the path blocked, but it was cleared by the traditional opening of the tourist season on 1 May in Kamačnik, and later in the year the construction of pavilions with tables for eating at the entrance. On 11 July, Kamačnik was designated a Natura 2000 site. The restaurant in Kamačnik was broken into and robbed in November together with the Gavranović stores in Dokmanovići and Severin na Kupi.

In 2016, a path was built connecting the Planinarski dom Kamačnik mountain hut with the Kamačnik canyon.

In 2024, the final section of the path to the source was widened.

The restaurant at the mouth of the river, Bistro Kamačnik, is open 9:00 to 20:00 on weekdays and to 21:00 on weekends, while entrance to the canyon itself only runs to 16:00. Kamačnik, with its sport fishing society ŠRD Kamačnik, regularly hosts the local Ribarska noć fishing festival, and used to host the Vrbovsko Bundevijada.

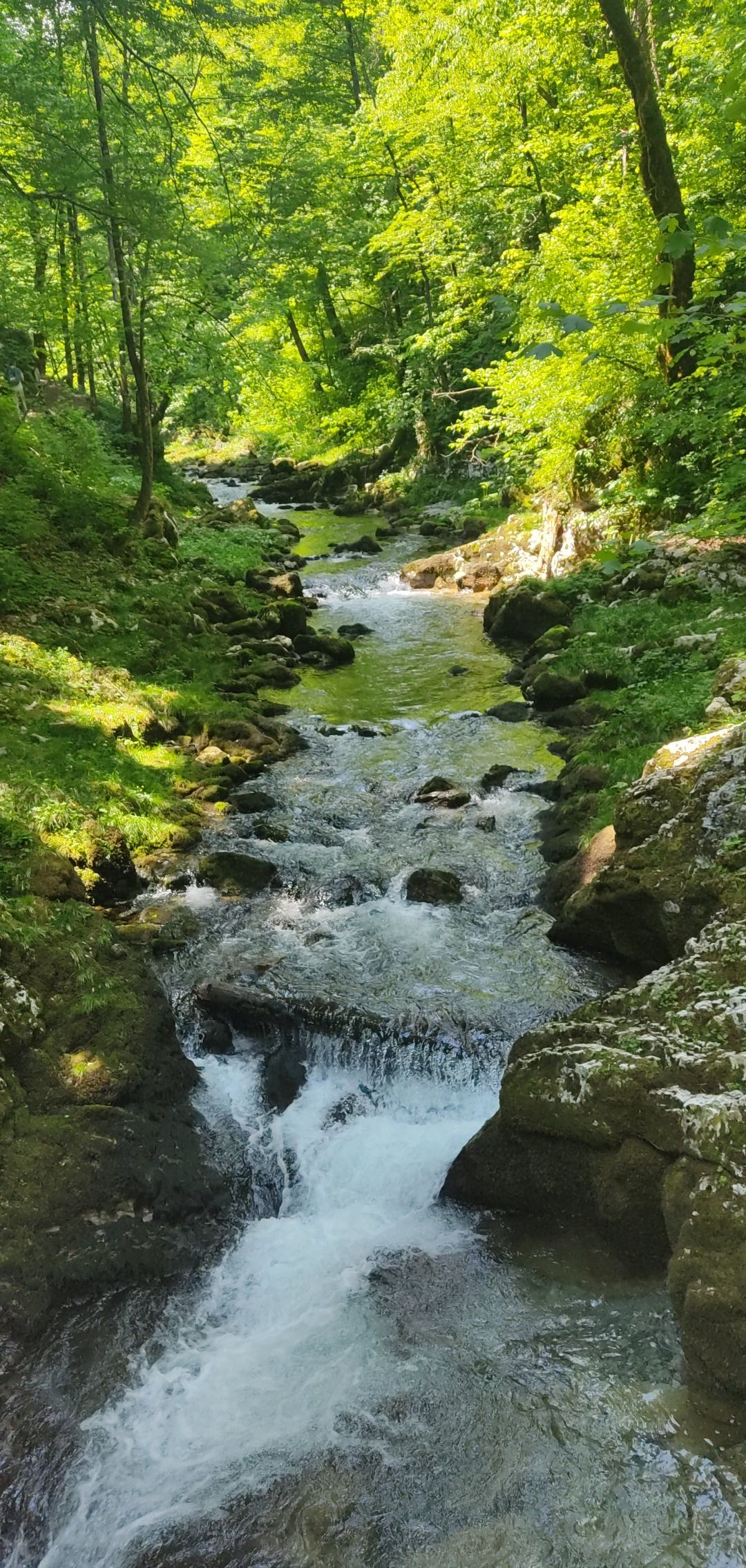
Course

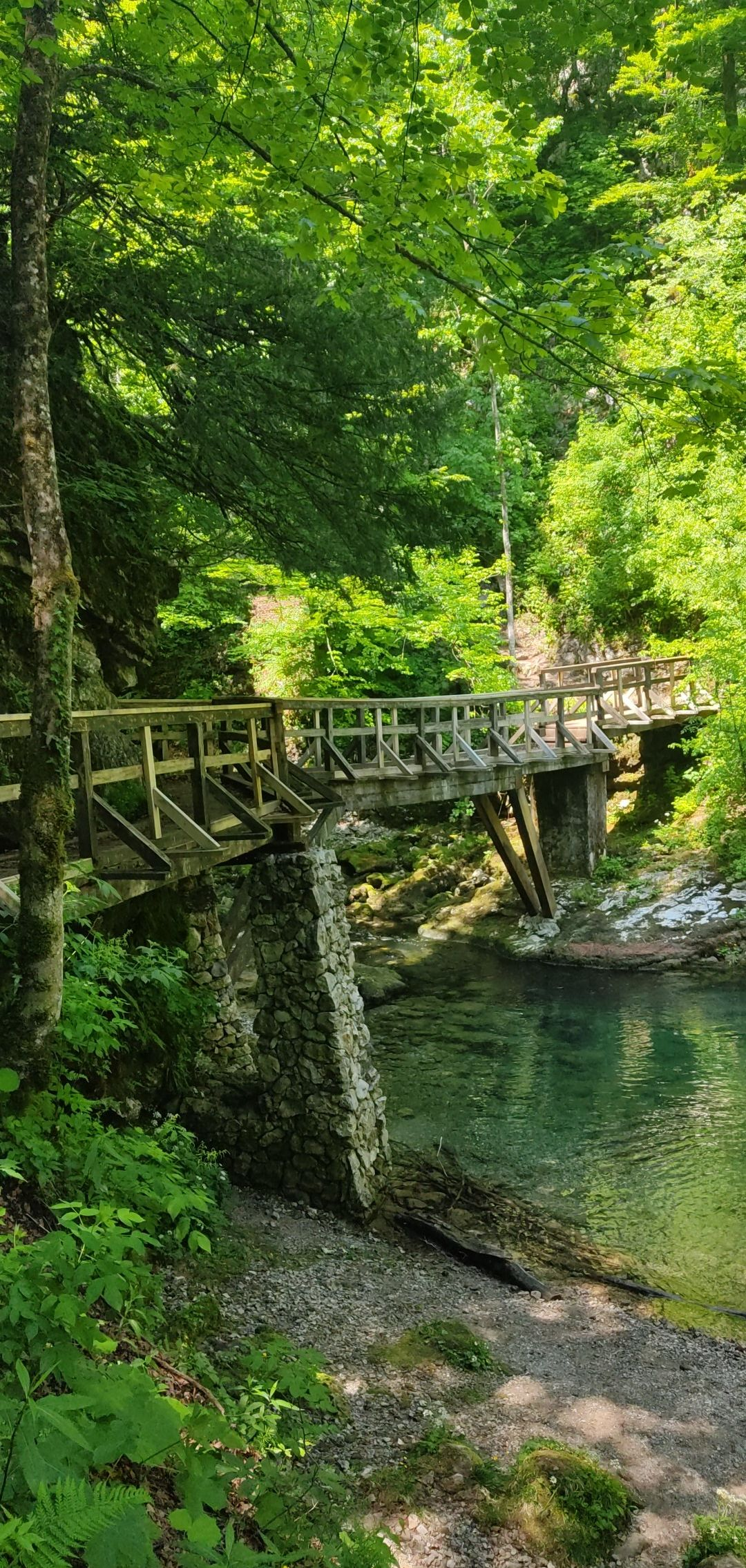
Bridge I

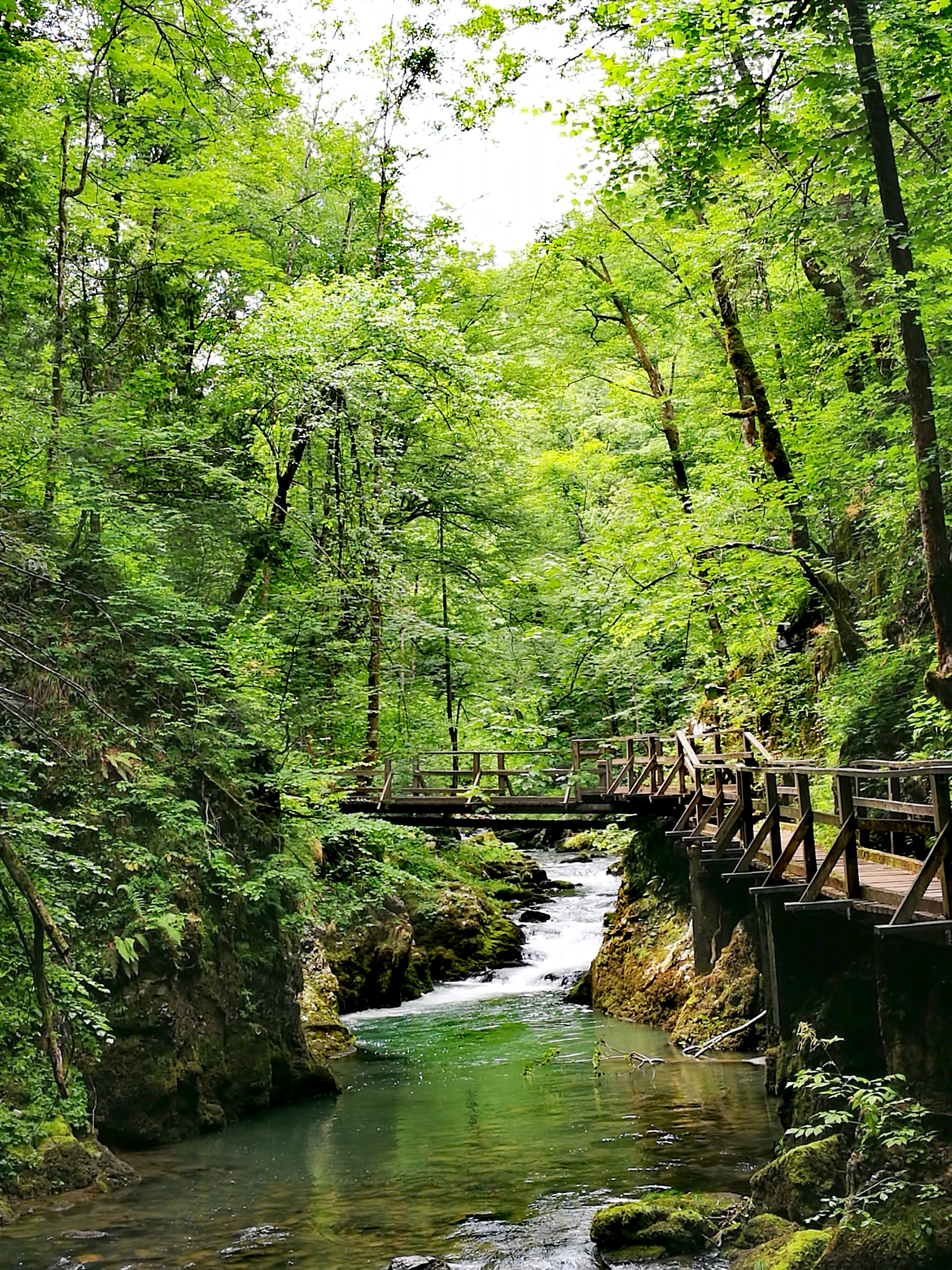
Bridge II

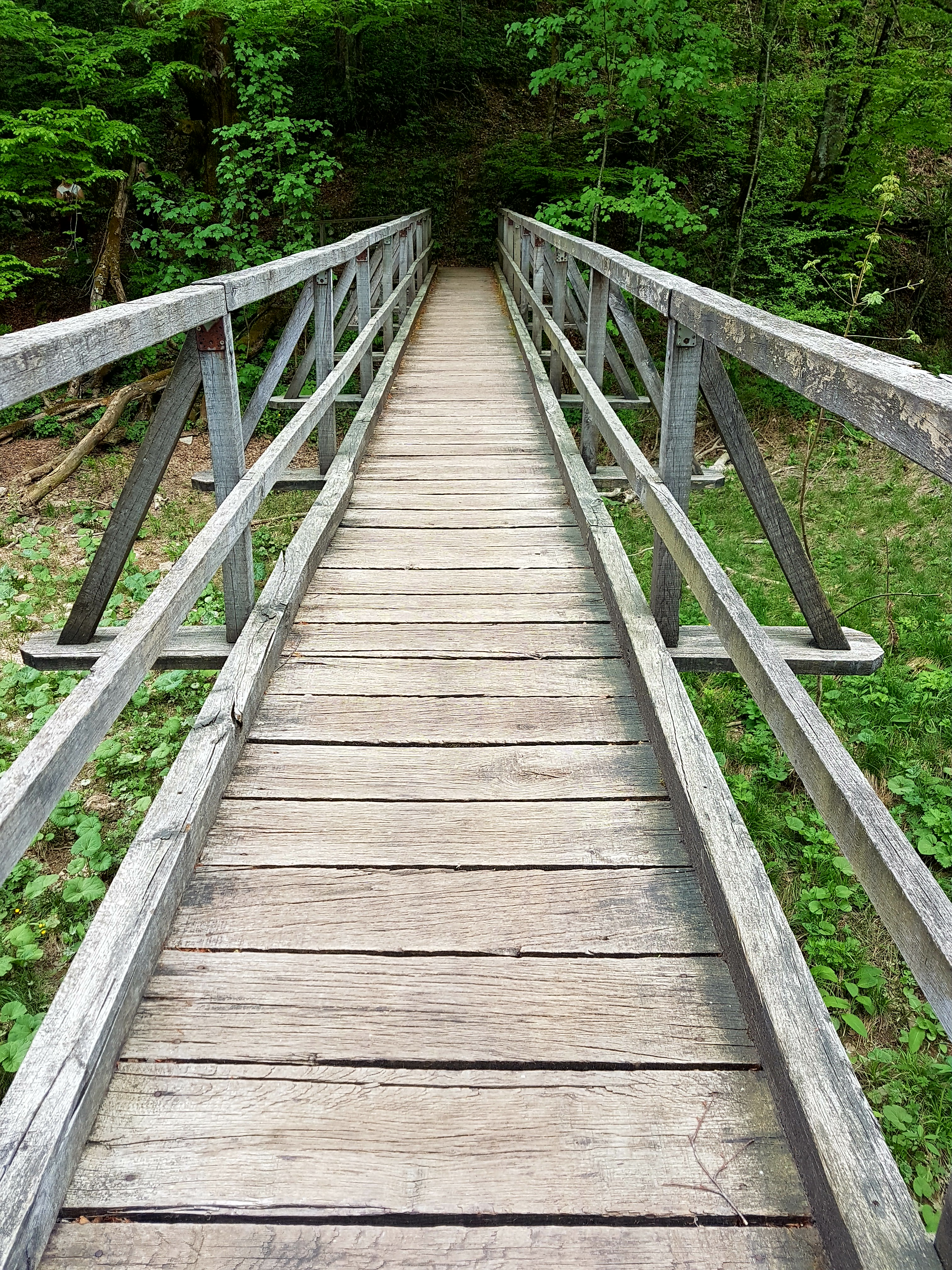
Bridge III

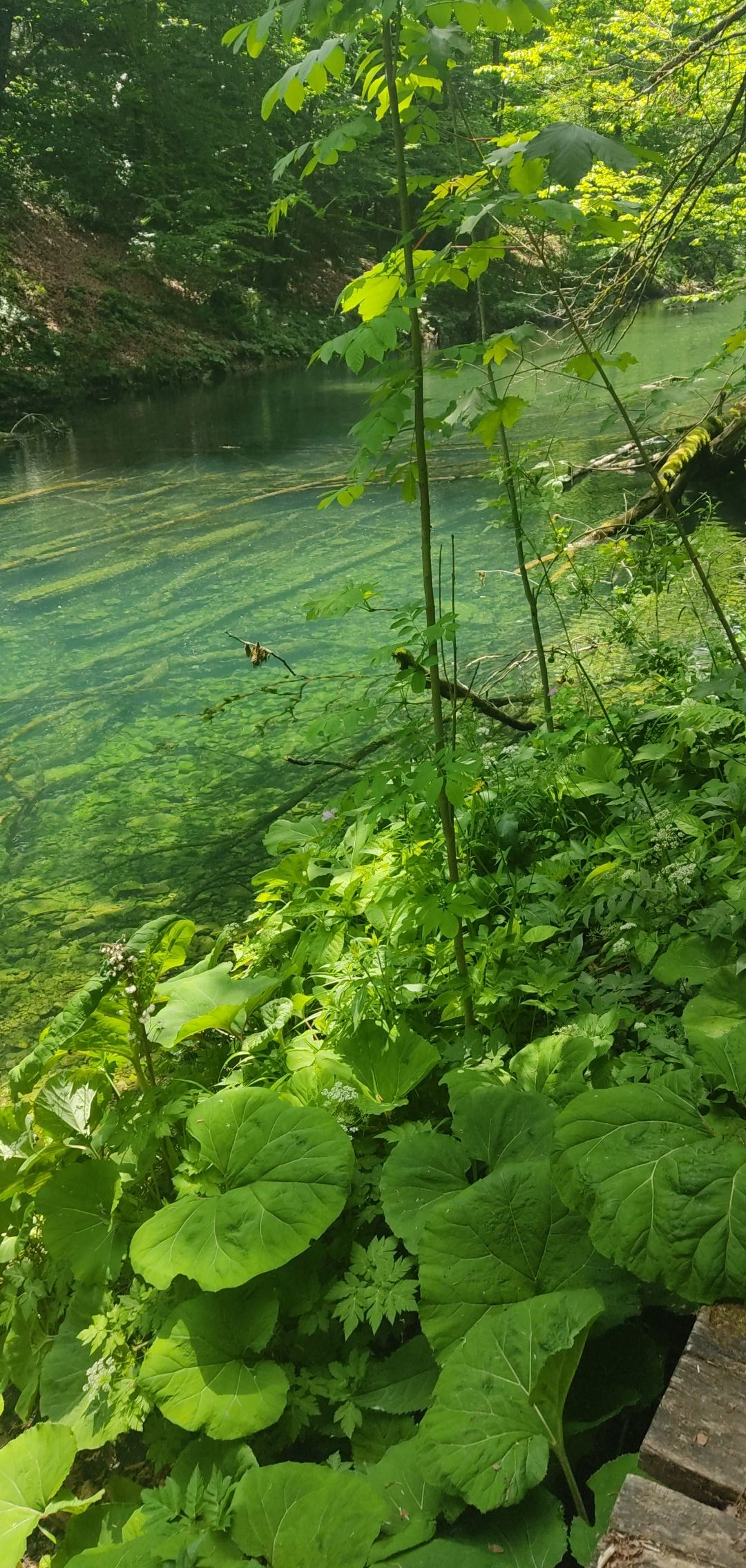
Vegetation

== Bibliography ==
- Žgela, Ivona (2023-09-11) [defended 2023-09-20]. Izazovi ruralnog turizma Gorskog kotara [Challenges of rural tourism in Gorski kotar] (Thesis) (in Serbo-Croatian). Rijeka: Sveučilište u Rijeci.
- Ralica, Iva (2022-03-15). "Čarobni kanjon Kamačnik: Otkrile smo zašto je ovo jedan od najomiljenijih izleta u Hrvatskoj". Miss7 (in Serbo-Croatian). Archived from the original on 2024-09-12.
- Grad Vrbovsko (2021). "Bistro Kamačnik, Vrbovsko". Visit Vrbovsko. Archived from the original on 2021-04-17.
