= Orovac =

- Village
- Location within Croatia
- Coordinates: 45.8837232°N 16.9354744°E
- Country: Croatia
- County: Bjelovar-Bilogora County
- Municipality: Severin

Area
  - Total: 5.2 sq mi (13.5 km^{2})

Population (2021)
  - Total: 253
  - Density: 48.5/sq mi (18.7/km^{2})
- Time zone: UTC+1 (CET)
  - Summer (DST): UTC+2 (CEST)

Orovac is a village in Croatia.

== Demographics ==
According to the 2021 census, its population was 253.
