= Osojnik, Primorje-Gorski Kotar County =

Osojnik
- Village
- Interactive map of Osojnik
- Location within Croatia
- Coordinates: 45.393206°N 15.205493°E
- Country: Croatia
- County: Primorje-Gorski Kotar County
- City: Vrbovsko
- Community: Jadrč-Osojnik

Area
  - Total: 28.8 km^{2} (11.1 sq mi)
- Elevation: 332 m (1,089 ft)

Population (2021)
  - Total: 86
  - Density: 3.0/km^{2} (7.7/sq mi)
- Time zone: UTC+1 (CET)
  - Summer (DST): UTC+2 (CEST)
- Postal code: 51326
- Area code: +385 051

Osojnik is a village in Croatia, under the Vrbovsko township, in Primorje-Gorski Kotar County. It is divided into Donji Osojnik and Gornji Osojnik. These end a chain of villages of increasing elevation from Mali Jadrč to Veliki Jadrč, Donji Osojnik and Gornji Osojnik.

== History ==
On 8 June 1654, Juraj V Frankapan Tržački issued in Novigrad na Dobri a document granting Stjepan Domitrović a selo in Osojnik, while ordering a resolution to the border dispute between Jadrč and Ponikve.

In the 1774 list of duties, the villagers of Osojnik mentioned their preserved slobodni list from grof Frangepan dated 28 June 1654, which made them freedmen.

On 9 June 1774, Gregorij Knežić lord of Bosiljevo drew up in Bosiljevo on behalf of the widow lady Ana Vojković and her housekeeper Elizabeth de Pozzi a list of duties of freemen in Jadrč and Osojnik. It was signed by judge Marko Vuk and Marko Kramarić of Osojnik. The villagers of Jadrč spring water even in the summer, in contrast to those of Osojnik for whom it dried up. They milled their wheat on the Kupa about an hour to an hour and a half's walk away. The Karolina was mentioned. The vineyards on Tisovac and Gložac were also mentioned. The transcript survives in the HDA in Zagreb, and was published by Rudolf Strohal. The original survives in the HDA, and was published by Rudolf Strohal.

=== Kingdom of Yugoslavia ===
In July 1936, Ivan Goran Kovačić and other HSS members and sympathisers founded Gospodarska sloga chapters in Severin and Lukovdol. On 9 August, they held a meeting in Osojnik along with one in Veliki Jadrč.

Osojnik received tap water in 1939–1940 after the construction of a 1.0 kilometre (0.62 mi) pipeline.

=== WWII ===
Nikola and Jure Domitrović, Jure Kramarić, Fanika Krajačić and Drago Špehar of Osojnik were listed by SUBNOR as fallen antifascist soldiers in WWII. Petar Kramarić, Mijo Pavlić and Dragutin Špehar were listed as victims of fascism.

=== Recent ===
On 30 August 2012, a leak in Vrbovsko forced a water shutoff that affected Osojnik, among others.

Osojnik was hit by the 2014 Dinaric ice storm.

== Demographics ==
As of 2021, there were only 12 inhabitants under the age of 20.

Village of Osojnik: Population trends 1857–2021
v

population	465	441	426	415	367	368	355	391	333	317	258	247	209	197	130	102	86
	1857	1869	1880	1890	1900	1910	1921	1931	1948	1953	1961	1971	1981	1991	2001	2011	2021

Sources: Croatian Bureau of Statistics publications

In 1870, Osojnik, alone in its porezna općina, had 79 houses and 441 people.

In 1890, Osojnik had 78 houses and 411 people. The villagers of Osojnik were under Lukovdol parish. They attended the school in Lukovdol but were administered by Severin and taxed by Osojnik. The tax district of Osojnik also administered Kamensko

=== Further reading ===
- Kraljevski zemaljski statistički ured (1903). Političko i sudbeno razdieljenje i Repertorij prebivališta Kraljevina Hrvatske i Slavonije po stanju od 1. travnja 1903. Zagreb: Kraljevska hrvatsko-slavonsko-dalmatinska zemaljska vlada, 🖶 Kraljevska zemaljska tiskara.
- Kraljevski zemaljski statistički ured (May 1913). "Repertorij prebivališta po županijama, upravnim kotarima, gradovima, upravnim i poreznim općinama". Političko i sudbeno razdjeljenje i Repertorij prebivališta Kraljevina Hrvatske i Slavonije po stanju od 1. siječnja 1913. Zagreb: Kraljevska hrvatsko-slavonsko-dalmatinska zemaljska vlada, 🖶 Kraljevska zemaljska tiskara. pp. 1–126. Page 33.

== Politics ==
As of its foundation on 3 March 2008, it belongs to the local committee of Jadrč-Osojnik, which meets in Veliki Jadrč.

== Infrastructure ==
The water storage unit in Gornji Osojnik is also responsible for Donji Osojnik, Dražice, Veliki Jadrč and Mali Jadrč.

Osojnik has an Udaljeni pretplatnički stupanj (UPS).
