= Mali Jadrč =

- Village
- Interactive map of Mali Jadrč
- Location within Croatia
- Coordinates: 45.400°N 15.143°E
- Country: Croatia
- County: Primorje-Gorski Kotar County
- City: Vrbovsko
- Community: Jadrč-Osojnik

Area
  - Total: 5.6 km^{2} (2.2 sq mi)
- Elevation: 306 m (1,004 ft)

Population (2021)
  - Total: 28
  - Density: 5.0/km^{2} (13/sq mi)
- Time zone: UTC+1 (CET)
  - Summer (DST): UTC+2 (CEST)
- Postal code: 51326
- Area code: +385 051

Mali Jadrč is a village in Croatia, under the Vrbovsko township, in Primorje-Gorski Kotar County. Along with Veliki Jadrč, it is one of two villages that make up Jadrč. It is the first of a chain of villages of increasing elevation from Mali Jadrč to Veliki Jadrč, Donji Osojnik and Gornji Osojnik.

== History ==
In the 1774 list of duties, the villagers of Osojnik mentioned their preserved slobodni list from grof Frangepan dated 28 June 1654, which made them freedmen; that of the villagers of Jadrč had burned up about 50 years prior.

On 9 June 1774, Gregorij Knežić lord of Bosiljevo drew up in Bosiljevo on behalf of the widow lady Ana Vojković and her housekeeper Elizabeth de Pozzi a list of duties of freemen in Jadrč and Osojnik. It was signed by Mihal Muretić of Jadrč. The villagers of Jadrč spring water even in the summer, in contrast to those of Osojnik for whom it dried up. They milled their wheat on the Kupa about an hour's walk away. The Karolina was mentioned. The transcript survives in the HDA in Zagreb, and was published by Rudolf Strohal. The original survives in the HDA, and was published by Rudolf Strohal.

=== Kingdom of Yugoslavia ===
Construction on the Črnomelj-Vrbovsko railway begun in 1939, but by 1940 it had come to a halt thanks to a worker dispute. Thanks to the outbreak of WWI, it was never finished.

=== Recent ===
On 30 August 2012, a leak in Vrbovsko forced a water shutoff that affected Mali Jadrč, among others.

Mali Jadrč was hit by the 2014 Dinaric ice storm.

In 2023, the road entering Mali Jadrč was asphalted.

== Demographics ==
As of 2021, there were only 7 inhabitants under the age of 20.

Village of Mali Jadrč: Population trends 1857–2021
v

population	192	199	206	209	179	154	158	131	128	117	85	98	62	87	38	35	28
	1857	1869	1880	1890	1900	1910	1921	1931	1948	1953	1961	1971	1981	1991	2001	2011	2021

Sources: Croatian Bureau of Statistics publications

In 1870, Jadrč Mali, alone in its own porezna općina, had 23 houses and 199 people.

In 1890, Jadrč Mali had 39 houses and 209 people. Its villagers were under Lukovdol parish and school districts, but were taxed by Jadrč Mali and administered by Severin. Jadrč Mali tax district also administered Smišljak.

=== Further reading ===
- Kraljevski zemaljski statistički ured (1903). Političko i sudbeno razdieljenje i Repertorij prebivališta Kraljevina Hrvatske i Slavonije po stanju od 1. travnja 1903. Zagreb: Kraljevska hrvatsko-slavonsko-dalmatinska zemaljska vlada, 🖶 Kraljevska zemaljska tiskara.
- Kraljevski zemaljski statistički ured (May 1913). "Repertorij prebivališta po županijama, upravnim kotarima, gradovima, upravnim i poreznim općinama". Političko i sudbeno razdjeljenje i Repertorij prebivališta Kraljevina Hrvatske i Slavonije po stanju od 1. siječnja 1913. Zagreb: Kraljevska hrvatsko-slavonsko-dalmatinska zemaljska vlada, 🖶 Kraljevska zemaljska tiskara. pp. 1–126. Page 33.

== Politics ==
As of its foundation on 3 March 2008, it belongs to the local committee of Jadrč-Osojnik, which meets in Veliki Jadrč.

== Sports ==
Beginning in 2013, the 7 stage 260 kilometres (160 mi) long Cycling Trail of Gorski Kotar (Croatian: Goranska biciklistička transverzala) passes through Mali Jadrč.

== Infrastructure ==
The water storage unit in Gornji Osojnik is also responsible for Donji Osojnik, Dražice, Veliki Jadrč and Mali Jadrč.

== Bibliography ==
=== Dialectology ===
- Valenčić, Marina (2013-08-19). "Opisi istočnih kajkavskih govora Gorskoga kotara nekad i danas". Hrvatski dijalektološki zbornik (18): 101–110. eISSN 2459-4849.
- Brabec, Ivan (1966). "Mješoviti govori na sjevernoj periferiji hrvatskosrpskog jezika". Ljetopis Jugoslavenske akademije znanosti i umjetnosti. 77: 421–425. ISSN 0373-9902.
- Barac, Vida; Finka, Božidar (1963). "Ispitivanje govora u Gorskom kotaru". Ljetopis Jugoslavenske akademije znanosti i umjetnosti. 70: 385–389. ISSN 0373-9902.

=== History ===
- Korenčić, Mirko (1979). Naselja i stanovništvo Socijalističke Republike Hrvatske (1857–1971) [Villages and Population of the Socialist Republic of Croatia (1857–1971)]. Djela Jugoslavenske akademije znanosti i umjetnosti (in Serbo-Croatian). Vol. 54.
- Banska vlast Banovine Hrvatske (1940d). "Socijalna zaštita radništva". Godišnjak banske vlasti Banovine Hrvatske (in Croatian). Vol. 1. pp. 229–241.
