= Kasun (Sri Lankan name) =

Kasun (Sinhala: කසුන්) is a Sri Lankan given name, and an occasional surname that may refer to the following notable people:

Given name

- Kasun Abeyrathne (born 1998), Sri Lankan cricketer
- Kasun Caldera (born 1992), Sri Lankan cricketer
- Kasun Ekanayake (born 1997), Sri Lankan cricketer
- Kasun Jayasuriya (born 1980), Sri Lankan football player
- Kasun Kalhara (born 1981), Sri Lankan singer and musician
- Kasun Madushanka (born 1991), Sri Lankan cricketer
- Kasun Rajitha (born 1993), Sri Lankan cricketer
- Kasun de Silva (born 1990), Sri Lankan cricketer
- Kasun Vidura (born 1993), Sri Lankan cricketer

Surname

- Umesh Kasun (born 1996), Sri Lankan cricketer
