= Ponikve, Karlovac County =

Ponikve Поникве
- Location within Croatia
- Coordinates: 45°22′23″N 15°14′13″E
- Country: Croatia
- County: Karlovac
- City: Ogulin

Area
  - Total: 20.7 km^{2} (8.0 sq mi)
- Elevation: 222 m (728 ft)

Population (2021)
  - Total: 58
  - Density: 2.8/km^{2} (7.3/sq mi)
- Time zone: UTC+1 (CET)
  - Summer (DST): UTC+2 (CEST)
- Postal code: 51326 Vrbovsko
- Area code: +385 (0)47

Ponikve is a village in Karlovac County, Croatia. It is located in the municipality of Ogulin. The river Ponikva runs through it.

== Name ==
It was recorded as Ponikue on the 1673 map of Stjepan Glavač.

== History ==
On 8 June 1654, Juraj V Frankapan Tržački issued in Novigrad na Dobri a document granting Stjepan Domitrović a selo in Osojnik, while ordering a resolution to the border dispute between Jadrč and Ponikve.

=== WWII ===
In late June or early July 1941, the priest in Ponikve was arrested. In early July, he had not yet been sent away. As of a 15 July document, all he had been sent to a concentration camp.

Around 7:00 on 19 June 1942, a group of 18 Partisans halted and commandeered an automobile belonging to Matija Rački of Severin, who had been transporting passengers to Karlovac. They commanded the owner and passengers to return to their homes, and directed the driver to take them to Ponikve, where they let Rački go but kept the automobile for themselves.

=== Recent ===
On 27 March 2022 at 13:16 the ŽVOC Karlovac received a call about a wildfire in the area. 144 hectares (360 acres) burned by the time it was put out at 17:00 by 13 firefighters with 5 vehicles JVP Ogulin, DVD Ogulin, DVD Zagorje and DVD Ribarić.

== Demographics ==
Village of Ponikve: Population trends 1857–2021
v

population	758	909	946	911	795	832	760	799	695	648	483	406	292	179	159	98	58
	1857	1869	1880	1890	1900	1910	1921	1931	1948	1953	1961	1971	1981	1991	2001	2011	2021

Note:Od 1857. do 1880. sadrži dio podataka za naselje Popovo Selo. Od 1910. do 1931. sadrži dio podataka za naselje Gomirje, grad Vrbovsko, županija Primorsko-goranska. Sources: Croatian Bureau of Statistics publications

== Politics ==
It is the seat of its own local committee.

== Bibliography ==
- Trgo, Fabijan, ed. (1964). Zbornik dokumenata i podataka o Narodno-oslobodilačkom ratu Jugoslovenskih naroda. Vol. V, 32.
- Melem Hajdarović, Mihela (2023-06-14). "Glavačeva karta Hrvatske iz 1673. – njezini toponimi, geografski sadržaj i historijskogeografski kontekst" [Glavač’s map of Croatia from 1673: Its toponyms, geographical content, and historical-geographical context]. Studia lexicographica. 17 (32): 47–78. doi:10.33604/sl.17.32.2. eISSN 2459-5578.
