= Kasun (Croatian surname) =

Kasun is a Croatian surname.

They are mostly from the environs of Vrbovsko, where it remains the second most common surname in Veliki Jadrč, but today it is chiefly found in Zagreb, followed by Osijek, Zadar and Varaždin. Some of its members have emigrated to Canada and others to the United States.

It may refer to:

- Kevin Kasun, member of Legislative Assembly of Saskatchewan
- Mario Kasun (1980–), former basketball player
- Robert Kasun (1951–), auxiliary bishop of the Roman Catholic Archdiocese of Toronto

== Bibliography ==
- Moj.hr (n.d.). "Prezime Kasun". Acta Croatica (in Croatian).
