= Kassun al-Jabal =

Kassun al-Jabal كاسون الجبل
- Village
- Location in Syria
- Coordinates: 35°9′17″N 36°50′52″E
- Country: Syria
- Governorate: Hama
- District: Hama
- Subdistrict: Hama

Population (2004)
  - Total: 586
- Time zone: UTC+3 (AST)
- City Qrya Pcode: C3016

Kassun al-Jabal (Arabic: كاسون الجبل) is a village in central Syria, administratively part of the Hama Governorate, located east of Hama city. According to the Syria Central Bureau of Statistics (CBS), Kassun al-Jabal had a population of 586 in the 2004 census. Its inhabitants are Sunni Muslims.

== History ==
Kassun al-Jabal was owned by the Bani Khalid, partly nomadic Bedouin tribe in central Syria, in the early 20th century. Its inhabitants were Sunni Muslim Arabs of Bedouin origin.

== Bibliography ==
- Comité de l'Asie française (April 1933). "Notes sur la propriété foncière dans le Syrie centrale (Notes on Landownership in Central Syria)". Bulletin du Comité de l'Asie française (in French). 33 (309). Comité de l'Asie française: 130–136.
