= Stative (disambiguation) =

Stative may refer to:

- Stative, a type of verb
- Donje Stative, a village in Croatia
- Gornje Stative, a village in Croatia
