= Štajduhar =

Štajduhar is a Croatian and Slovenian surname.

In Croatia, they are mostly from the environs of Vrbovsko, where it was once the most common surname in Razdrto, but today it is chiefly found in Zagreb, followed by Rijeka, Karlovac, Osijek and Gradište. Some of its members have emigrated to Germany, Canada, Australia and the United States.

It may refer to:

- Mason Stajduhar (1997–), professional footballer
- Nick Stajduhar (1974–), former professional ice hockey defenceman

== Bibliography ==
- Moj.hr (n.d.). "Prezime Štajduhar". Acta Croatica (in Croatian).
