= Muminović =

Muminović is a Bosniak or Croatian surname. Notable people with the surname include:

- Ahmet Muminović (1945–2019), Yugoslav comic book artist and journalist
- Azir Muminović (born 1997), Bosnian footballer
- Damir Muminovic (born 1990), Icelandic footballer
- Muhamed Muminović (born 1948), astronomer from Bosnia and Herzegovina, the namesake of 182730 Muminovic, minor planet
- Sanin Muminović (born 1990), Croatian footballer
