= Saint Helena Labour Party =

- General Secretary: G. A. D. Thornton
- Founded: 1974
- Dissolved: c. 1976
- Headquarters: P.O. Box 34, Jamestown, Saint Helena
- Ideology: Right-wing libertarianism Neoliberalism
- Political position: Right-wing
- Legislative Council of Saint Helena (1976): 0 / 12

The Saint Helena Labour Party was a political party on the island of Saint Helena (a British crown colony). The party was founded in 1974. Despite having a similar name to that of many left-wing parties across the world, the party advocated private enterprise as opposed to dependence on British economic aid and a supposedly government-dominated economy. It supported closer links with South Africa.

The founding of the party had been preceded by a controversy regarding the purchase of the Solomon & Co. enterprise (a local trading company) by the South African concern South Atlantic Trade and Investment Company (SATIC). The British government had taken over the SATIC operations in Saint Helena, fearing South African dominance over the local economy. The founder of the party was G. A. D. 'Tony' Thornton, a businessman of dual South African and British nationality. Thornton served as the general secretary of the party. The Saint Helena Labour Party was the first opposition party on the island.

In November 1975 the party published a document, authored by Thornton, titled 'The St. Helena Manifesto'. The 34-page document criticised the policies of British authorities and accused the government of Saint Helena of neglecting the interests of the island. The manifesto charged that the 1974–1979 development plan was a blueprint for underdevelopment and depopulation of the island. The party argued against public health care and education, and called for developing local industries and exports. Thornton's positions were met with criticism from the Saint Helena government, discarding the economic policies of the Saint Helena Labour Party as unrealistic.

In December 1975 the British governor Sir Thomas Oates decided to deport Thornton from Saint Helena. The expulsion caused an uproar amongst the inhabitants of the island. The political life of Saint Helena was divided into pro- and anti-Thornton camps, with demonstrations, petitions, public meetings and court cases.

After his expulsion, Thornton continued to try to rally support for the Saint Helena Labour Party. The party contested the 1976 election to the Legislative Council of Saint Helena, but failed to win any seats. The party appears to have become defunct in the same year, at a similar point in time as its pro-British adversary the Saint Helena Progressive Party.
