= Veliki Jadrč =

Veliki Jadrč Veli Jadrč
- Village
- Interactive map of Veliki Jadrč
- Location within Croatia
- Coordinates: 45.400°N 15.175°E
- Country: Croatia
- County: Primorje-Gorski Kotar County
- City: Vrbovsko

Area
  - Total: 6.4 km^{2} (2.5 sq mi)
- Elevation: 335 m (1,099 ft)

Population (2021)
  - Total: 49
  - Density: 7.7/km^{2} (20/sq mi)
- Time zone: UTC+1 (CET)
  - Summer (DST): UTC+2 (CEST)
- Postal code: 51326
- Area code: +385 051

Veliki Jadrč is a village in Croatia, under the Vrbovsko township, in Primorje-Gorski Kotar County. Along with Mali Jadrč, it is one of two villages that make up Jadrč. It is the second of a chain of villages of increasing elevation from Mali Jadrč to Veliki Jadrč, Donji Osojnik and Gornji Osojnik.

== Name ==
It was recorded as Idets on the 1673 map of Stjepan Glavač.

== History ==
On 8 June 1654, Juraj V Frankapan Tržački issued in Novigrad na Dobri a document granting Stjepan Domitrović a selo in Osojnik, while ordering a resolution to the border dispute between Jadrč and Ponikve.

On 20 April 1679, Janko Herendić wrote a land grant for Ivan Benić in Veliki Jadrč, specifically "na Grabarčim i lučicu Bačeve i na vrh Gerganice", in the house of priest Ferenc Herendić in Severin, with witnesses Jurica Herendić, Katarina Ivančić and Pere Benić. The transcript survives in the HDA.

In the 1774 list of duties, the villagers of Osojnik mentioned their preserved slobodni list from grof Frangepan dated 28 June 1654, which made them freedmen; that of the villagers of Jadrč had burned up about 50 years prior.

On 9 June 1774, Gregorij Knežić lord of Bosiljevo drew up in Bosiljevo on behalf of the widow lady Ana Vojković and her housekeeper Elizabeth de Pozzi a list of duties of freemen in Jadrč and Osojnik. It was signed by Mihal Muretić of Jadrč. The villagers of Jadrč spring water even in the summer, in contrast to those of Osojnik for whom it dried up. They milled their wheat on the Kupa about an hour's walk away. The Karolina was mentioned. The vineyards on Tisovac and Gložac were also mentioned. The transcript survives in the HDA in Zagreb, and was published by Rudolf Strohal. The original survives in the HDA, and was published by Rudolf Strohal.

In 1796, some 7 Latin folia were drawn up for the purpose of founding a new parish in Veliki Jadrč, which never happened. It is still under Lukovdol.

In July 1936, Ivan Goran Kovačić and other HSS members and sympathisers founded Gospodarska sloga chapters in Severin and Lukovdol. On 9 August, they held a meeting in Veliki Jadrč along with one in Osojnik.

=== WWII ===
Mate Halamić of Veliki Jadrč was listed by SUBNOR as a victim of fascism.

=== Federal era ===
The volunteer fire department DVD Veliki Jadrč was founded in 1951, the same year as the DVD Severin na Kupi, and is today part of the VZ grada Vrbovsko. Its current commander is Miro Vrbanac.

=== Recent ===
Veliki Jadrč was hit by the 2014 Dinaric ice storm.

== Demographics ==
As of 2021, there were only 7 inhabitants under the age of 20.

Village of Veliki Jadrč: Population trends 1857–2021
v

population	456	441	404	406	352	279	254	233	236	245	228	197	163	225	104	73	49
	1857	1869	1880	1890	1900	1910	1921	1931	1948	1953	1961	1971	1981	1991	2001	2011	2021

Sources: Croatian Bureau of Statistics publications

In 1870, Jadrč Veliki, alone in its porezna općina, had 62 houses and 441 people.

In 1890, Jadrč Veliki had 79 houses and 400 people. Šormanka had 2 houses and 6 people. Its villagers were under Lukovdol parish and school districts, but were taxed by Jadrč Veliki and administered by Severin.

=== Further reading ===
- Kraljevski zemaljski statistički ured (1903). Političko i sudbeno razdieljenje i Repertorij prebivališta Kraljevina Hrvatske i Slavonije po stanju od 1. travnja 1903. Zagreb: Kraljevska hrvatsko-slavonsko-dalmatinska zemaljska vlada, 🖶 Kraljevska zemaljska tiskara.
- Kraljevski zemaljski statistički ured (May 1913). "Repertorij prebivališta po županijama, upravnim kotarima, gradovima, upravnim i poreznim općinama". Političko i sudbeno razdjeljenje i Repertorij prebivališta Kraljevina Hrvatske i Slavonije po stanju od 1. siječnja 1913. Zagreb: Kraljevska hrvatsko-slavonsko-dalmatinska zemaljska vlada, 🖶 Kraljevska zemaljska tiskara. pp. 1–126. Page 33.

== Politics ==
As of its foundation on 3 March 2008, it is the seat of the local committee of Jadrč-Osojnik, encompassing Mali Jadrč and Osojnik.

Presidents of local committee:

- Alojz Sudac (2008)
- Ivan Vrbanac (2009)
- Dražen Domitrović (2013, 2017, 2021), Independent

== Sports ==
Beginning in 2013, the 7 stage 260 kilometres (160 mi) long Cycling Trail of Gorski Kotar (Croatian: Goranska biciklistička transverzala) passes through Veliki Jadrč.

== Notable people ==
- Alojz Bonašin (died near Jadrč on 12 May 1944)
- Ante Brkan

== Infrastructure ==
The water storage unit in Gornji Osojnik is also responsible for Donji Osojnik, Dražice, Veliki Jadrč and Mali Jadrč.

== Bibliography ==
- Melem Hajdarović, Mihela (2023-06-14). "Glavačeva karta Hrvatske iz 1673. – njezini toponimi, geografski sadržaj i historijskogeografski kontekst" [Glavač’s map of Croatia from 1673: Its toponyms, geographical content, and historical-geographical context]. Studia lexicographica. 17 (32): 47–78. doi:10.33604/sl.17.32.2. eISSN 2459-5578.
