= Severin, Bjelovar-Bilogora County =

Severin
- Municipality
- Interactive map of Severin
- Location within Croatia
- Coordinates: 45°50′12.84″N 16°57′33.12″E
- Country: Croatia
- County: Bjelovar-Bilogora County

Government
  - Mayor: Žarko Žgela (HDZ)

Area
  - Municipality: 10.0 sq mi (25.9 km^{2})
  - Urban: 4.8 sq mi (12.4 km^{2})

Population (2021)
  - Municipality: 702
  - Density: 70.2/sq mi (27.1/km^{2})
  - Urban: 449
  - Urban density: 93.8/sq mi (36.2/km^{2})
- Time zone: UTC+1 (CET)
  - Summer (DST): UTC+2 (CEST)
- Postal code: 43274
- Area code: +385 43
- Website: severin.hr

Severin is a settlement and a municipality in Bjelovar-Bilogora County, Croatia.

== History ==
In the late 19th and early 20th century, Severin was part of the Bjelovar-Križevci County of the Kingdom of Croatia-Slavonia.

In 1885, a legal case between Matija Mrak of Severin against Stjepan Tudić reached the level of the Sabor.

== Demographics ==
According to the 2021 census, the population of the municipality was 702 with 449 living in the town proper. In 2011, there were a total of 877 inhabitants, of which 87% are Croats. The village of Severin has 536 inhabitants, and the village of Orovac has 341.

The municipality consists of the following settlements:

- Orovac, population 253
- Severin, population 449
Severin: Population trends 1857–2021
v

population	972	1149	1137	1460	1654	1889	1968	2021	1812	1742	1678	1483	1295	1111	1038	877	702
	1857	1869	1880	1890	1900	1910	1921	1931	1948	1953	1961	1971	1981	1991	2001	2011	2021

Sources: Croatian Bureau of Statistics publications

== Politics ==
=== Minority councils and representatives ===
Directly elected minority councils and representatives are tasked with consulting tasks for the local or regional authorities in which they are advocating for minority rights and interests, integration into public life and participation in the management of local affairs. At the 2023 Croatian national minorities councils and representatives elections, the Serbs of Croatia fulfilled legal requirements to elect 10 members minority council of the Municipality of Severin but the elections were not organized due to the lack of candidates.
