= Saint Helena Progressive Party =

- Founded: 1973
- Dissolved: c. 1976
- Legislative Council of Saint Helena (1976): 11 / 12

The Saint Helena Progressive Party was a political party on the island of Saint Helena (a British crown colony). The party favoured retaining economic links with the United Kingdom.

The Saint Helena Progressive Party was founded in 1973. Its founders included eleven of the twelve members of the Legislative Council of Saint Helena elected in 1972. The party emerged following a rise in political awareness on the island, partly due to economic stringency caused by increased international inflation.

The Saint Helena Progressive Party secured eleven out of twelve Legislative Council seats in the September 1976 election. However, the party appears to have become defunct around 1976, around the same time as its rival, the Saint Helena Labour Party.
