= Restrictions on political parties =

Limits for organizing policy and candidatures for office

Restrictions on political parties have existed in many countries at various times.

In Uganda, for instance, political parties were restricted in their activities from 1986; in the non-party "Movement" system instituted by President Yoweri Museveni, political parties continued to exist but could not campaign in elections or field candidates directly (although electoral candidates could belong to political parties). A constitutional referendum cancelled this 19-year ban on multi-party politics in July 2005.

Egypt has been criticized for restricting political party activity.

Europe, Spain, Turkey and France have laws allowing the government to ban extremist and violent groups, especially neo-nazi organizations. In Germany, only the Constitutional Court can ban a party, which last happened in 1956. (Banned Communist party of Germany)

== See also ==
- Political repression
