= Klanac, Vrbovsko =

Coordinates: 45.4238°N 15.1923°E

Klanac, Croatia Кланац
- Village
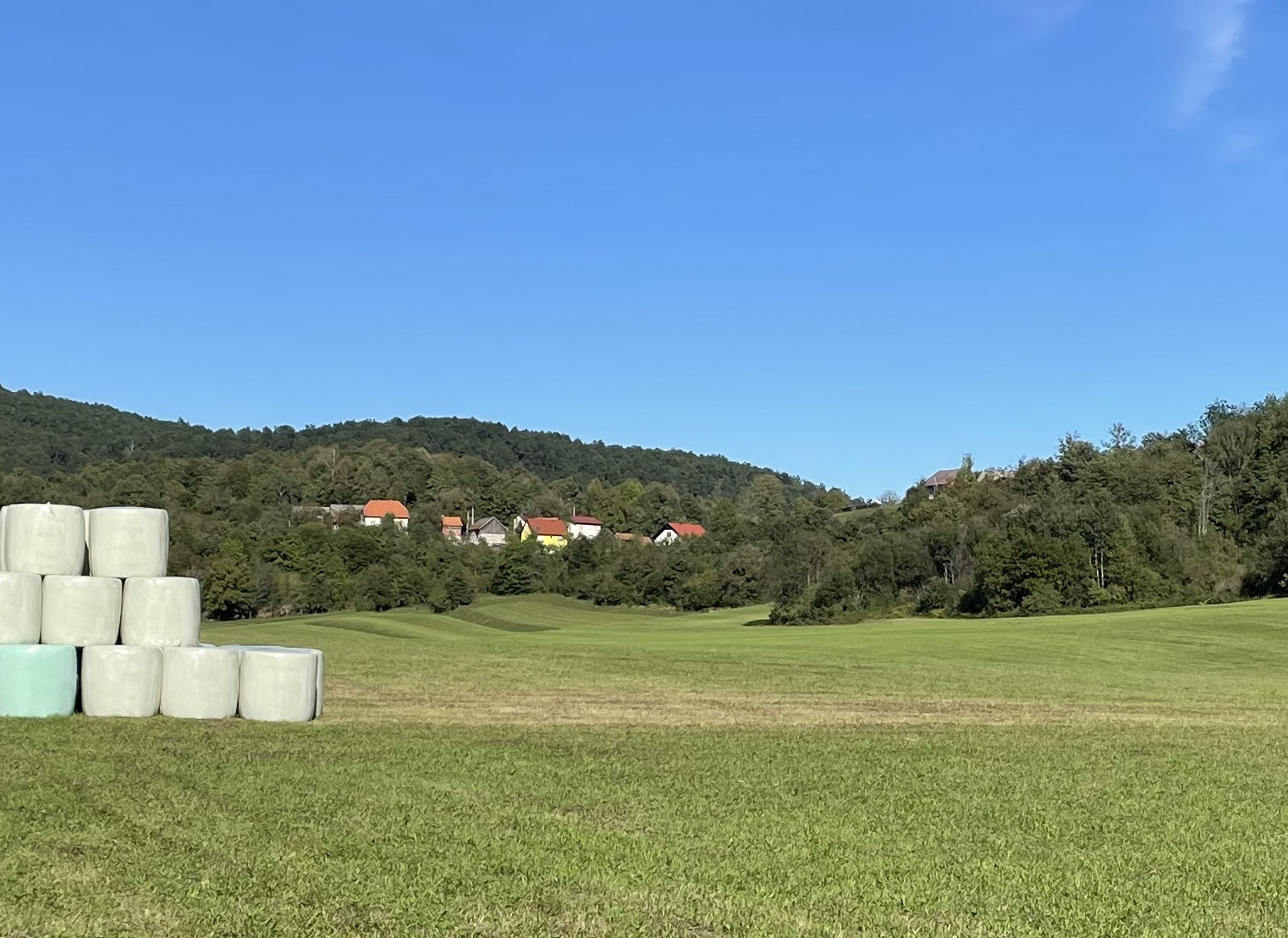
- Mali Klanac from Damaljsko polje
- Interactive map of Klanac, Croatia
- Location within Croatia
- Country: Croatia
- County: Primorje-Gorski Kotar
- Municipality: Vrbovsko
- Community: Severin na Kupi

Area
  - Total: 1.7 km^{2} (0.66 sq mi)
- Elevation: 214 m (702 ft)

Population (2021)
  - Total: 31
  - Density: 18/km^{2} (47/sq mi)
- Time zone: UTC+1 (CET)
  - Summer (DST): UTC+2 (CEST)

Klanac (Serbian Cyrillic: Кланац) is a village in Croatia. It is connected by the D3 highway.

== Geography ==
The view of the Kupa valley from the Lujzijana road at Klanac is particularly well-known.

== History ==
In 1780, the Report of the Commission for the Introduction of Urbarial Organisation on the Possessions of Klanac, Damalj, Plešivica and Severin na Kupi (Croatian: Izvještaj komisije za uvođenje urbarskog uređenja na posjedima Klanac, Damlja, Plješivica i Severin na Kupi), today with signature HR-ZaNSK R 6687, was drawn up.

In 1860–1879, Matija Mažuranić wrote a 62 folio manuscript today titled Writings on the Building of Roads in Gorski Kotar and Lika (Croatian: Spisi o gradnji cesta u Gorskom Kotaru i Lici), today with signature HR-ZaNSK R 6424. A 21 folio manuscript dated 1872 titled Darstellung der Entstehung des Baues ... der Luisenstrasse togethr with a translation by I. Mikloušić is kept as HR-ZaNSK R 4572.

In 1864, a rinderpest outbreak in Bosanci and Kasuni caused the Lujzijana to be closed to horned traffic for 21 days in December.

On 11 August 2012, drought caused a loss of tap water in Severin na Kupi, Draga Lukovdolska, Močile, Smišljak, Damalj, Klanac, Plešivica, Rim, Zdihovo and Liplje.

Klanac was hit by the 2014 Dinaric ice storm.

The Klanac beach became the most popular in Vrbovsko municipality, but it took some time to prepare it thanks to the municipality having been left out of previous EU financing projects, with most of the financing coming from local and national bodies instead.

On 18 July 2023, the wind of a thunderstorm left Klanac without power.

In 2023, an assortment of inflatable objects was installed near Damelj on the right bank. Comically, the inflatable objects nearly floated away in the autumn floods.

In 2024, the ŠRD Kamačnik organised a sport fishing competition on the Kupa by the mill near Klanac, becoming the first Hucho hucho fishing competition to be held on the territory of the Republic of Croatia.

== Demographics ==
As of 2021, there were only 2 inhabitants under the age of 20.

Village of Klanac: Population trends 1857–2021
v

population	166	175	152	149	143	138	107	116	123	113	86	95	74	83	57	35	31
	1857	1869	1880	1890	1900	1910	1921	1931	1948	1953	1961	1971	1981	1991	2001	2011	2021

Note:In 1990 it includes both Klanac Mali i Klanac Veliki. Sources: Croatian Bureau of Statistics publications

In 1870, Klanac's porezna općina included Plešivica and Damalj. Klanac itself had 12 houses and 175 people.

In 1890, Klanac had 31 houses and 149 people. Its villagers were under Lukovdol parish and school districts, but were taxed by administered by Severin and taxed by Klanac. Klanac tax district also administered Damalj and Plešivica

=== Further reading ===
- Kraljevski zemaljski statistički ured (1903). Političko i sudbeno razdieljenje i Repertorij prebivališta Kraljevina Hrvatske i Slavonije po stanju od 1. travnja 1903. Zagreb: Kraljevska hrvatsko-slavonsko-dalmatinska zemaljska vlada, 🖶 Kraljevska zemaljska tiskara.
- Kraljevski zemaljski statistički ured (May 1913). "Repertorij prebivališta po županijama, upravnim kotarima, gradovima, upravnim i poreznim općinama". Političko i sudbeno razdjeljenje i Repertorij prebivališta Kraljevina Hrvatske i Slavonije po stanju od 1. siječnja 1913. Zagreb: Kraljevska hrvatsko-slavonsko-dalmatinska zemaljska vlada, 🖶 Kraljevska zemaljska tiskara. pp. 1–126. Page 33.

== Attractions ==
There is a restaurant in Klanac, Mirni Kut.

== Sports ==
The "Gorski Kotar Bike Tour", held annually since 2012, sometimes goes through Klanac, such as in the first leg for 2024, which started and ended there.

== Politics ==
As of its foundation in 2006, it belongs to the local committee of Severin na Kupi, but the committee meets at Klanac 2a.

== Infrastructure ==
The water storage unit between Severin na Kupi and Damalj is responsible for Draga Lukovdolska, Močile, Smišljak, Klanac, Plešivica, Rim, Zdihovo and Liplje. The water pumping station Klanac affects the water storage units in Severin and Gornji Kalanji.

== Bibliography ==
- Grad Vrbovsko (2021). "Mirni Kut, Klanac". Visit Vrbovsko (in Serbo-Croatian). Archived from the original on 2021-04-18.
- TZGK (2022). "Mirni Kut". Gorski Kotar - Neodoljiv (in Serbo-Croatian). Archived from the original on 2022-07-02.
