= Damalj =

- Village
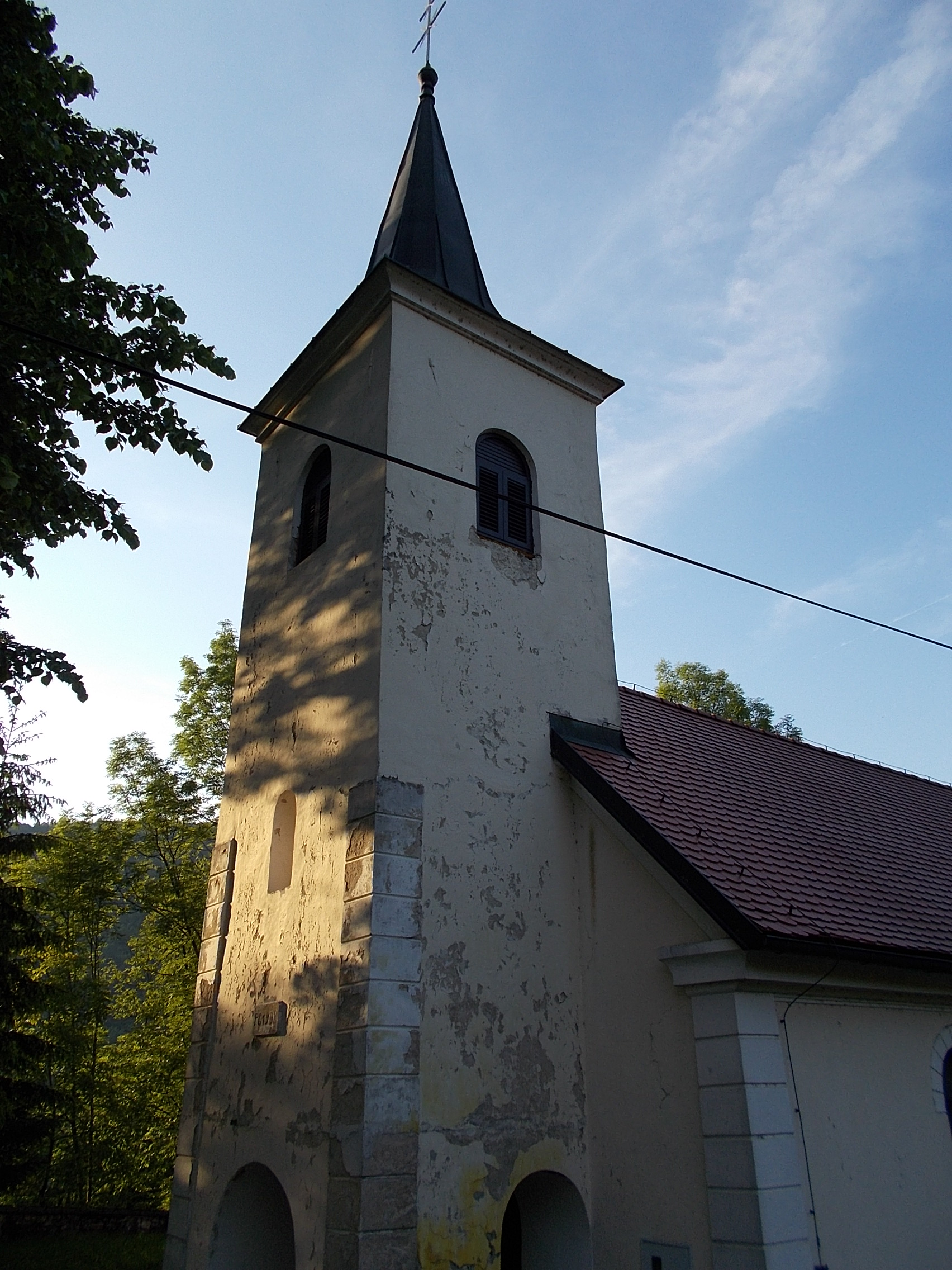
- Sv. Ilija church
- Interactive map of Damalj
- Location within Croatia
- Coordinates: 45.421°N 15.184°E
- Country: Croatia
- County: Primorje-Gorski Kotar County
- City: Vrbovsko
- Community: Severin na Kupi

Area
  - Total: 1.2 km^{2} (0.46 sq mi)
- Elevation: 209 m (686 ft)

Population (2021)
  - Total: 19
  - Density: 16/km^{2} (41/sq mi)
- Time zone: UTC+1 (CET)
  - Summer (DST): UTC+2 (CEST)
- Postal code: 51326
- Area code: +385 051

Damalj is a village in Croatia, under the Vrbovsko township, in Primorje-Gorski Kotar County.

== Name ==
Damalj shares an etymology with Damelj on the opposite side of the river.

== History ==
In 1780, the Report of the Commission for the Introduction of Urbarial Organisation on the Possessions of Klanac, Damalj, Plešivica and Severin na Kupi (Croatian: Izvještaj komisije za uvođenje urbarskog uređenja na posjedima Klanac, Damlja, Plješivica i Severin na Kupi), today with signature HR-ZaNSK R 6687, was drawn up. A 21 folio manuscript dated 1872 titled Darstellung der Entstehung des Baues ... der Luisenstrasse togethr with a translation by I. Mikloušić is kept as HR-ZaNSK R 4572.

In 1860–1879, Matija Mažuranić wrote a 62 folio manuscript today titled Writings on the Building of Roads in Gorski Kotar and Lika (Croatian: Spisi o gradnji cesta u Gorskom Kotaru i Lici), today with signature HR-ZaNSK R 6424.

In 1864, a rinderpest outbreak in Bosanci and Kasuni caused the Lujzijana to be closed to horned traffic for 21 days in December.

Josip Slivac of Damalj was listed by SUBNOR as a fallen antifascist soldier in WWII. Stjepan Canjar of Damalj was listed as a victim of fascism.

On 11 August 2012, drought caused a loss of tap water in Severin na Kupi, Draga Lukovdolska, Močile, Smišljak, Damalj, Klanac, Plešivica, Rim, Zdihovo and Liplje.

Damalj was hit by the 2014 Dinaric ice storm.

In 2015, the renewal of the old road from Damalj to Riblje by Severin was planned, but a dispute between the city of Vrbovsko and the owner of a field with part of the existing trail over the exact path of the road halted any progress.

In 2021, potatoes were planted by the city utility of Vrbovsko for the first time on the Damaljsko polje, for the purpose of feeding impoverished residents.

On 18 July 2023, the wind of a thunderstorm left Damalj without power.

== Demographics ==
As of 2021, the only inhabitant under the age of 20 was a single teenage boy.

Village of Damalj: Population trends 1857–2021
v

population	122	102	98	81	71	60	54	58	66	70	56	48	39	45	30	27	19
	1857	1869	1880	1890	1900	1910	1921	1931	1948	1953	1961	1971	1981	1991	2001	2011	2021

Sources: Croatian Bureau of Statistics publications

In 1870, Damalj, in Klanac's porezna općina, had 10 houses and 102 people.

In 1890, Damalj had 18 houses and 81 people. Its villagers were under Lukovdol parish and school districts, but were taxed by Klanac and administered by Severin.

=== Further reading ===
- Kraljevski zemaljski statistički ured (1903). Političko i sudbeno razdieljenje i Repertorij prebivališta Kraljevina Hrvatske i Slavonije po stanju od 1. travnja 1903. Zagreb: Kraljevska hrvatsko-slavonsko-dalmatinska zemaljska vlada, 🖶 Kraljevska zemaljska tiskara.
- Kraljevski zemaljski statistički ured (May 1913). "Repertorij prebivališta po županijama, upravnim kotarima, gradovima, upravnim i poreznim općinama". Političko i sudbeno razdjeljenje i Repertorij prebivališta Kraljevina Hrvatske i Slavonije po stanju od 1. siječnja 1913. Zagreb: Kraljevska hrvatsko-slavonsko-dalmatinska zemaljska vlada, 🖶 Kraljevska zemaljska tiskara. pp. 1–126. Page 33.

== Politics ==
As of its foundation in 2006, it belongs to the local committee of Severin na Kupi.

== Sports ==
The "Gorski Kotar Bike Tour", held annually since 2012, sometimes goes through Damalj, such as in the first leg for 2024.

== Infrastructure ==
The water storage unit between Severin na Kupi and Damalj is responsible for Draga Lukovdolska, Močile, Smišljak, Klanac, Plešivica, Rim, Zdihovo and Liplje. The water pumping station Klanac affects the water storage units in Severin and Gornji Kalanji.

== Gallery ==
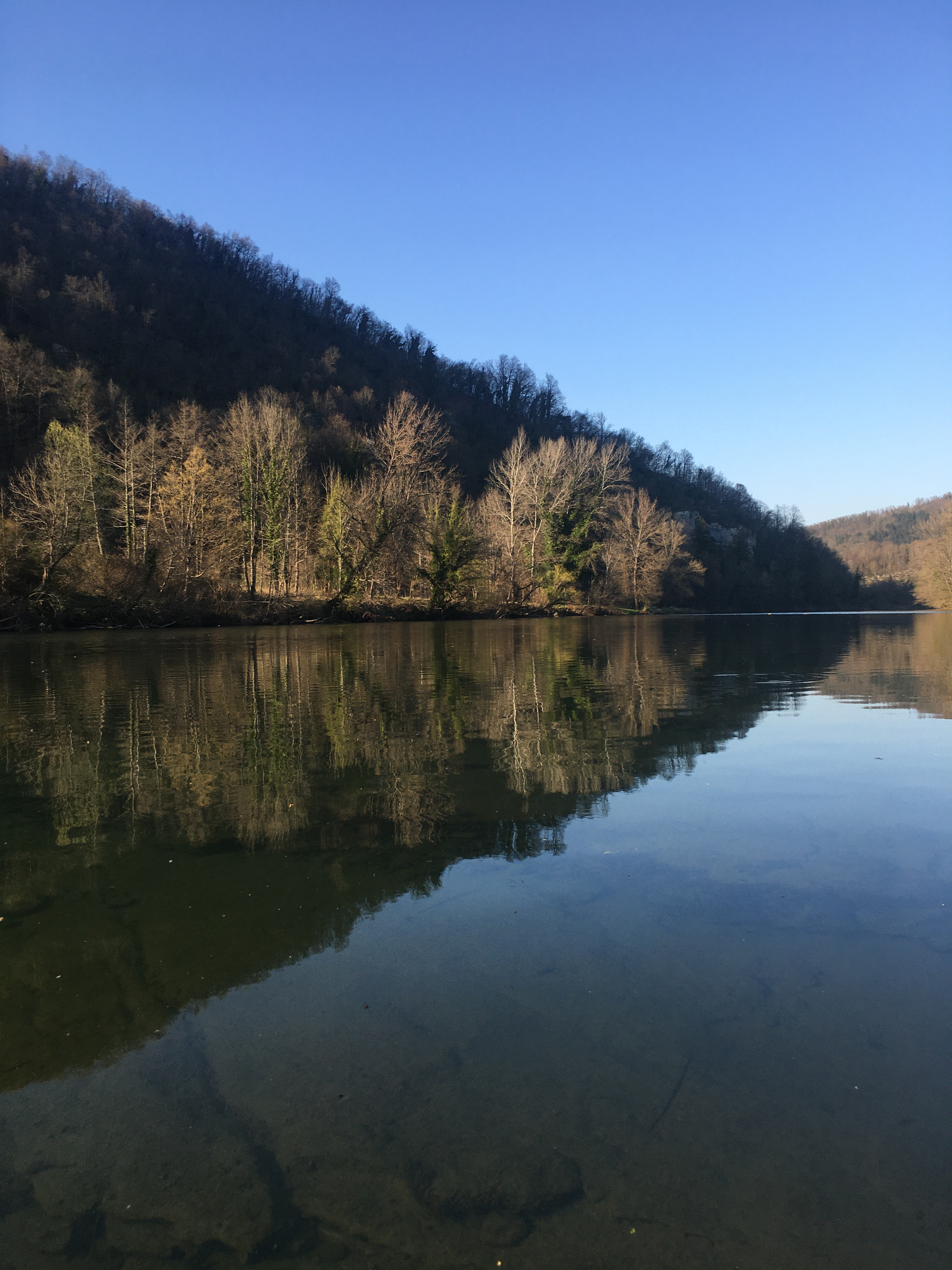
Kupa from the village.
