= Močile, Croatia =

Coordinates: 45°25′N 15°10′E

Močile Močile Lukovdolske
- Village
- Interactive map of Močile
- Location within Croatia
- Country: Croatia
- County: Primorje-Gorski Kotar
- Municipality: Vrbovsko
- Community: Severin na Kupi

Area
  - Total: 6.7 km^{2} (2.6 sq mi)
- Elevation: 221 m (725 ft)

Population (2021)
  - Total: 75
  - Density: 11/km^{2} (29/sq mi)
- Time zone: UTC+1 (CET)
  - Summer (DST): UTC+2 (CEST)

Močile or Močile Lukovdolske is a village in Croatia. It is connected by the D3 highway.

== History ==
In 1860–1879, Matija Mažuranić wrote a 62 folio manuscript today titled Writings on the Building of Roads in Gorski Kotar and Lika (Croatian: Spisi o gradnji cesta u Gorskom Kotaru i Lici), today with signature HR-ZaNSK R 6424. A 21 folio manuscript dated 1872 titled Darstellung der Entstehung des Baues ... der Luisenstrasse togethr with a translation by I. Mikloušić is kept as HR-ZaNSK R 4572.

In December 1862, a rinderpest outbreak killed 8 horned animals, leaving the farmer Rebrović, who was already poor, without a flock. Several nearby flocks were more moderately affected. Narodne novine printed a call for humanitarian assistance for Rebrović. In 1864, the outbreak in Bosanci and Kasuni caused the Lujzijana to be closed to horned traffic for 21 days in December.

=== WWII ===
On 9 May 1942, the 1st battalion of the Kordun Partisan Detachment unsuccessfully attacked the weapons depot in Severin, while a group of Serbs cut down about 50 poles in Močile and Draga Lukovdolska.

Josip Cerić, Božidar Jedinak and Tomislav Tončić of Močile were listed by SUBNOR as fallen antifascist soldiers in WWII. Anton Jedinak of Močile was listed as a victim of fascism.

=== Recent ===
For over a month beginning in mid-September 2011, Močile and several other remaining analog islands lost their television signal, though only from the Croatian side (Slovene channels were still available).

On 11 August 2012, drought caused a loss of tap water in Severin na Kupi, Draga Lukovdolska, Močile, Smišljak, Damalj, Klanac, Plešivica, Rim, Zdihovo and Liplje.

Močile was hit by the 2014 Dinaric ice storm.

In 2021, the road from the D3 to Gornje Močile was widened.

In 2023, the road in Močile to Pavlinac was asphalted.

== Demographics ==
As of 2021, there were only 7 inhabitants under the age of 20.

Village of Močile: Population trends 1857–2021
v

population	459	381	425	387	296	218	225	200	201	186	158	156	151	153	109	88	75
	1857	1869	1880	1890	1900	1910	1921	1931	1948	1953	1961	1971	1981	1991	2001	2011	2021

Sources: Croatian Bureau of Statistics publications

In 1870, Močile had 50 houses and 381 people.

In 1890, Močile had 72 houses and 387 people. They attended the school in and were taxed and administered by Severin.

=== Further reading ===
- Kraljevski zemaljski statistički ured (1903). Političko i sudbeno razdieljenje i Repertorij prebivališta Kraljevina Hrvatske i Slavonije po stanju od 1. travnja 1903. Zagreb: Kraljevska hrvatsko-slavonsko-dalmatinska zemaljska vlada, 🖶 Kraljevska zemaljska tiskara.
- Kraljevski zemaljski statistički ured (May 1913). "Repertorij prebivališta po županijama, upravnim kotarima, gradovima, upravnim i poreznim općinama". Političko i sudbeno razdjeljenje i Repertorij prebivališta Kraljevina Hrvatske i Slavonije po stanju od 1. siječnja 1913. Zagreb: Kraljevska hrvatsko-slavonsko-dalmatinska zemaljska vlada, 🖶 Kraljevska zemaljska tiskara. pp. 1–126. Page 33.

== Politics ==
As of its foundation in 2006, it belongs to the local committee of Severin na Kupi.

== Sports ==
Beginning in 2013, the 7 stage 260 kilometres (160 mi) long Cycling Trail of Gorski Kotar (Croatian: Goranska biciklistička transverzala) passes through Močile.

== Infrastructure ==
The water storage unit between Severin na Kupi and Damalj is responsible for Draga Lukovdolska, Močile, Smišljak, Klanac, Plešivica, Rim, Zdihovo and Liplje. This pipe system was reconstructed and sanitised in 2024.

== Bibliography ==
=== Dialectology ===
- Valenčić, Marina (2013-08-19). "Opisi istočnih kajkavskih govora Gorskoga kotara nekad i danas". Hrvatski dijalektološki zbornik (18): 101–110. eISSN 2459-4849.
- Barac-Grum, Vida (1981). "Močila". Fonološki opisi srpskohrvatskih/hrvatskosrpskih, slovenačkih i makedonskih govora obuhvaćenih opšteslovenskim lingvističkim atlasom. pp. 297–300.
- Barac, Vida; Finka, Božidar (1963). "Ispitivanje govora u Gorskom kotaru". Ljetopis Jugoslavenske akademije znanosti i umjetnosti. 70: 385–389. ISSN 0373-9902.

=== History ===
- Martinković (1854-04-10) [written 1854-03-14]. "Poziv od strane ureda c. kr. podžupani karlovačke nižepodpisani vojnoj dužnosti podvèrženi momci". Carsko kraljevske službene narodne novine (in Serbo-Croatian). Vol. 20, no. 82. p. 217. ISSN 1333-5243.
- Podžupan (1859-07-27) [written 1859-06-14]. "Poziv". Carsko kraljevske službene narodne novine (in Serbo-Croatian). Vol. 20, no. 170. pp. 433–434. ISSN 1333-5243.
- Korenčić, Mirko (1979). Naselja i stanovništvo Socijalističke Republike Hrvatske (1857–1971) [Villages and Population of the Socialist Republic of Croatia (1857–1971)]. Djela Jugoslavenske akademije znanosti i umjetnosti (in Serbo-Croatian). Vol. 54.
- Trgo, Fabijan, ed. (1964). Zbornik dokumenata i podataka o Narodno-oslobodilačkom ratu Jugoslovenskih naroda. Vol. V, 32.
