= Draga Lukovdolska =

Draga Lukovdolska Lukovdolska Draga
- Village
- Interactive map of Draga Lukovdolska
- Location within Croatia
- Coordinates: 45.418726°N 15.144217°E
- Country: Croatia
- County: Primorje-Gorski Kotar County
- City: Vrbovsko
- Community: Lukovdol

Area
  - Total: 0.6 km^{2} (0.23 sq mi)
- Elevation: 243 m (797 ft)

Population (2021)
  - Total: 18
  - Density: 30/km^{2} (78/sq mi)
- Time zone: UTC+1 (CET)
  - Summer (DST): UTC+2 (CEST)
- Postal code: 51326
- Area code: +385 051

Draga Lukovdolska is a village in Croatia, under the Vrbovsko township, in Primorje-Gorski Kotar County.

== Name ==
It was formerly known simply as "Valley" (Serbo-Croatian: Draga). Draga is also the name of many villages and many more hamlets.

== History ==
In 1860–1879, Matija Mažuranić wrote a 62 folio manuscript today titled Writings on the Building of Roads in Gorski Kotar and Lika (Croatian: Spisi o gradnji cesta u Gorskom Kotaru i Lici), today with signature HR-ZaNSK R 6424.

In 1864, a rinderpest outbreak in Bosanci and Kasuni caused the Lujzijana to be closed to horned traffic for 21 days in December.

Construction on the Črnomelj-Vrbovsko railway begun in 1939, but by 1940 it had come to a halt thanks to a worker dispute. It ran through Draga. Thanks to the outbreak of WWI, it was never finished.

On 9 May 1942, the 1st battalion of the Kordun Partisan Detachment unsuccessfully attacked the weapons depot in Severin, while a group of Serbs cut down about 50 poles in Močile and Draga.

On 11 August 2012, drought caused a loss of tap water in Severin na Kupi, Draga Lukovdolska, Močile, Smišljak, Damalj, Klanac, Plešivica, Rim, Zdihovo and Liplje.

Draga Lukovdolska was hit by the 2014 Dinaric ice storm.

== Demographics ==
As of 2021, there were only 2 inhabitants under the age of 20, both girls.

In 1828/1830, there were 128 residents in 14 families, all Catholic.

Village of Draga Lukovdolska: Population trends 1857–2021
v

population	133	118	138	131	93	74	74	72	69	64	54	45	46	38	24	19	18
	1857	1869	1880	1890	1900	1910	1921	1931	1948	1953	1961	1971	1981	1991	2001	2011	2021

Note:Do 1900. iskazivano pod imenom Draga. Sources: Croatian Bureau of Statistics publications

In 1870, Draga's porezna općina included Nadvučnik. Draga itself had 15 houses and 118 people.

In 1890, Draga had 23 houses and 131 people. Its villagers were under Lukovdol parish and school districts, but were administered by Severin and taxed by Draga. Draga tax district also administered Nadvučnik, including Gvozdac and Lovnik.

=== Further reading ===
- Kraljevski zemaljski statistički ured (1903). Političko i sudbeno razdieljenje i Repertorij prebivališta Kraljevina Hrvatske i Slavonije po stanju od 1. travnja 1903. Zagreb: Kraljevska hrvatsko-slavonsko-dalmatinska zemaljska vlada, 🖶 Kraljevska zemaljska tiskara.
- Kraljevski zemaljski statistički ured (May 1913). "Repertorij prebivališta po županijama, upravnim kotarima, gradovima, upravnim i poreznim općinama". Političko i sudbeno razdjeljenje i Repertorij prebivališta Kraljevina Hrvatske i Slavonije po stanju od 1. siječnja 1913. Zagreb: Kraljevska hrvatsko-slavonsko-dalmatinska zemaljska vlada, 🖶 Kraljevska zemaljska tiskara. pp. 1–126. Page 33.

== Politics ==
As of its foundation on 3 March 2008, it belongs to the local committee of Lukovdol.

== Sports ==
Beginning in 2013, the 7 stage 260 kilometres (160 mi) long Cycling Trail of Gorski Kotar (Croatian: Goranska biciklistička transverzala) passes through Draga Lukovdolska.

== Infrastructure ==
The water storage unit between Severin na Kupi and Damalj is responsible for Draga Lukovdolska, Močile, Smišljak, Klanac, Plešivica, Rim, Zdihovo and Liplje. The water storage unit in Nadvučnik, with a capacity of 400 cubic metres (14,000 ft^{3}) at an elevation of 444 metres (1,457 ft), is also responsible for Lukovdol, Podvučnik, Vučnik, Gorenci and part of Draga Lukovdolska. With a 2 l/s flow, this area often experiences water shortages.

== Bibliography ==
=== Genealogy ===
- Martinković (1854-04-10) [written 1854-03-14]. "Poziv od strane ureda c. kr. podžupani karlovačke nižepodpisani vojnoj dužnosti podvèrženi momci". Carsko kraljevske službene narodne novine (in Serbo-Croatian). Vol. 20, no. 82. p. 217. ISSN 1333-5243.
- Podžupan (1859-07-27) [written 1859-06-14]. "Poziv". Carsko kraljevske službene narodne novine (in Serbo-Croatian). Vol. 20, no. 170. pp. 433–434. ISSN 1333-5243.
- Barac-Grum, Vida (1987-06-28). "Pogled na gorskokotarsku povijesnu antroponimiju" [A View into the Historical Anthroponymy of Gorski Kotar]. Rasprave Instituta za hrvatski jezik (in Croatian). 13 (1): 5–8. ISSN 1331-6745.

=== History ===
- Korenčić, Mirko (1979). Naselja i stanovništvo Socijalističke Republike Hrvatske (1857–1971) [Villages and Population of the Socialist Republic of Croatia (1857–1971)]. Djela Jugoslavenske akademije znanosti i umjetnosti (in Serbo-Croatian). Vol. 54.
- Trgo, Fabijan, ed. (1964). Zbornik dokumenata i podataka o Narodno-oslobodilačkom ratu Jugoslovenskih naroda. Vol. V, 32.
- Banska vlast Banovine Hrvatske (1940d). "Socijalna zaštita radništva". Godišnjak banske vlasti Banovine Hrvatske (in Croatian). Vol. 1. pp. 229–241.
