= Rim, Primorje-Gorski Kotar County =

Coordinates: 45°25′18″N 15°12′27″E

Rim
- Village
- Interactive map of Rim
- Country: Croatia
- County: Primorje-Gorski Kotar County
- Town: Vrbovsko
- Community: Severin na Kupi

Area
  - Total: 1.4 km^{2} (0.54 sq mi)
- Elevation: 200 m (660 ft)

Population (2021)
  - Total: 30
  - Density: 21/km^{2} (55/sq mi)
- Time zone: UTC+1 (CET)
  - Summer (DST): UTC+2 (CEST)

Rim is a village in Croatia. It is connected by the D3 highway.

== History ==
In 1860–1879, Matija Mažuranić wrote a 62 folio manuscript today titled Writings on the Building of Roads in Gorski Kotar and Lika (Croatian: Spisi o gradnji cesta u Gorskom Kotaru i Lici), today with signature HR-ZaNSK R 6424. A 21 folio manuscript dated 1872 titled Darstellung der Entstehung des Baues ... der Luisenstrasse together with a translation by I. Mikloušić is kept as HR-ZaNSK R 4572.

In 1864, a rinderpest outbreak in Bosanci and Kasuni caused the Lujzijana to be closed to horned traffic for 21 days in December.

On 11 August 2012, drought caused a loss of tap water in Severin na Kupi, Draga Lukovdolska, Močile, Smišljak, Damalj, Klanac, Plešivica, Rim, Zdihovo and Liplje.

Rim was hit by the 2014 Dinaric ice storm.

On 18 July 2023, the wind of a thunderstorm left Rim without power.

== Demographics ==
As of 2021, there were 11 inhabitants under the age of 20.

Village of Rim: Population trends 1857–2021
v

population	106	90	81	106	77	66	55	62	56	54	45	39	45	36	27	38	30
	1857	1869	1880	1890	1900	1910	1921	1931	1948	1953	1961	1971	1981	1991	2001	2011	2021

Sources: Croatian Bureau of Statistics publications

In 1828/1830, there were 58 residents in 6 families, all Catholic.

In 1870, Rim's porezna općina included Zdihovo and Liplje. Rim itself had 12 houses and 90 people. Rim was in Lukovdol parish, but Zdihovo and Liplje were in Bosiljevo parish.

In 1890, Rim itself had 17 houses and 106 people. For taxation purposes, Liplje and Zdihovo were subordinated. The villagers of Rim variously fell under Bosiljevo or Lukovdol parish. Rim itself attended the school in and was administered by Severin and was taxed by Rim.

=== Further reading ===
- Kraljevski zemaljski statistički ured (1903). Političko i sudbeno razdieljenje i Repertorij prebivališta Kraljevina Hrvatske i Slavonije po stanju od 1. travnja 1903. Zagreb: Kraljevska hrvatsko-slavonsko-dalmatinska zemaljska vlada, 🖶 Kraljevska zemaljska tiskara.
- Kraljevski zemaljski statistički ured (May 1913). "Repertorij prebivališta po županijama, upravnim kotarima, gradovima, upravnim i poreznim općinama". Političko i sudbeno razdjeljenje i Repertorij prebivališta Kraljevina Hrvatske i Slavonije po stanju od 1. siječnja 1913. Zagreb: Kraljevska hrvatsko-slavonsko-dalmatinska zemaljska vlada, 🖶 Kraljevska zemaljska tiskara. pp. 1–126. Page 33.

== Politics ==
As of its foundation in 2006, it belongs to the local committee of Severin na Kupi.

== Attractions ==
Rim has a restaurant, whose name is also Rim.

== Sports ==
The "Gorski Kotar Bike Tour", held annually since 2012, sometimes goes through Rim, such as in the first leg for 2024.

== Infrastructure ==
The water storage unit between Severin na Kupi and Damalj is responsible for Draga Lukovdolska, Močile, Smišljak, Klanac, Plešivica, Rim, Zdihovo and Liplje.

== Bibliography ==
- Korenčić, Mirko (1979). Naselja i stanovništvo Socijalističke Republike Hrvatske (1857–1971) [Villages and Population of the Socialist Republic of Croatia (1857–1971)]. Djela Jugoslavenske akademije znanosti i umjetnosti (in Serbo-Croatian). Vol. 54.
- Grad Vrbovsko (2021). "Restoran Rim, Severin na Kupi". Visit Vrbovsko. Archived from the original on 2021-04-17.
- TZGK (2022). "Restoran Rim". Gorski Kotar - Neodoljiv. Archived from the original on 2022-07-02.
