= Zdihovo, Primorje-Gorski Kotar County =

Zdihovo Zdihovo Bosiljsko, Bosiljevsko Zdihovo
- Village
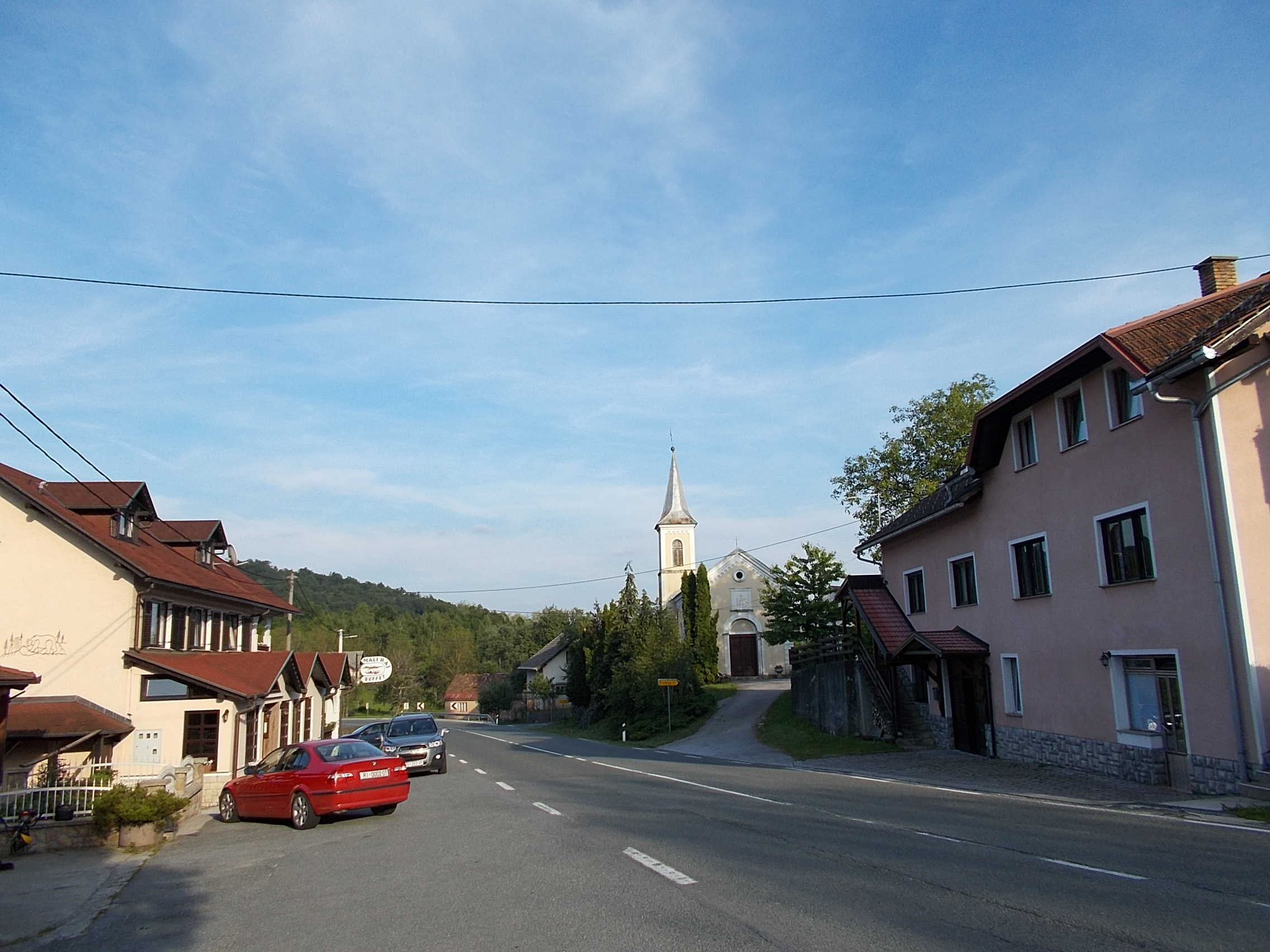
- Interactive map of Zdihovo
- Location within Croatia
- Coordinates: 45.423154°N 15.220428°E
- Country: Croatia
- County: Primorje-Gorski Kotar County
- City: Vrbovsko
- Community: Severin na Kupi

Area
  - Total: 1 km^{2} (0.39 sq mi)
- Elevation: 196 m (643 ft)

Population (2021)
  - Total: 29
  - Density: 29/km^{2} (75/sq mi)
- Time zone: UTC+1 (CET)
  - Summer (DST): UTC+2 (CEST)
- Postal code: 51326
- Area code: +385 051

Zdihovo or Zdihovo Bosiljsko is a village in Croatia, under the Vrbovsko township, in Primorje-Gorski Kotar County.

== History ==
In 1860–1879, Matija Mažuranić wrote a 62 folio manuscript today titled Writings on the Building of Roads in Gorski Kotar and Lika (Croatian: Spisi o gradnji cesta u Gorskom Kotaru i Lici), today with signature HR-ZaNSK R 6424. A 21 folio manuscript dated 1872 titled Darstellung der Entstehung des Baues ... der Luisenstrasse togethr with a translation by I. Mikloušić is kept as HR-ZaNSK R 4572.

After the Lujzijana was built, the Družtvo lujzinske ceste constructed an inn in Zdihovo. In 1874, the society would sell all its assets along the road, including those in Zdihovo.

In 1864, a rinderpest outbreak in Bosanci and Kasuni caused the Lujzijana to be closed to horned traffic for 21 days in December.

On the day of the 1867 Croatian parliamentary election in Lukovdol općina, 8 December, SP partisan Marko Domitrović of Zdihovo arrived claiming to have been sent by Ban Levin Rauch and Grand Župan Mirko Bogović. First, before the elections, he went around urging voters to vote for the government's candidate, issuing threats to state workers that they would lose their jobs if they did not vote for the NUS. Then, once the elections had begun, he blocked the entrance to the poll in the parish priest's house with the justification that elections were to be held in the open, despite the locally snowy conditions. The president of the deputation, Radoslav Lopašić, together with secretary Kovačić, pointed out to Domitrović that he did not himself have the right to vote in Lukovdol as a non-resident, at which Domitrović angrily retorted that "in three days" he would "take him away to Zagreb in chains". Lopašić asked him to show a legal document granting him such rights, and when he failed to produce one, he pointed out to Domitrović that as a judge he could have him arrested, but did not because it was a Sunday and the bell rang for mass. Many listened to Domitrović anyway and some left for Plemenitaš, where J. Medved was ultimately chosen. The next day, judge Lopašić escorted Domitrović on his way to Zagreb, but only after getting Domitrović to sign an admission that he had been sent by Rauch and Bogović.

=== WWII ===
Vide Pečar and Slavko Rovan of Zdihovo were listed by SUBNOR as fallen antifascist soldiers in WWII. Slavko Pupić of Zdihovo was listed as a victim of fascism.

At 13:00 on 14 June 1942, a group of 80 Partisans took Zdihovo, posting guards along the road who prevented any traffic from going further toward Karlovac.

Around 7:00 on 19 June 1942, a group of 18 Partisans halted and commandeered an automobile belonging to Matija Rački of Severin, who had been transporting passengers to Karlovac. They commanded the owner and passengers to return to their homes, and directed the driver to take them to Ponikve, where they let Rački go but kept the automobile for themselves.

=== Recent ===
On 11 August 2012, drought caused a loss of tap water in Severin na Kupi, Draga Lukovdolska, Močile, Smišljak, Damalj, Klanac, Plešivica, Rim, Zdihovo and Liplje.

Zdihovo was hit by the 2014 Dinaric ice storm.

On 18 July 2023, the wind of a thunderstorm left Zdihovo without power.

== Demographics ==
As of 2021, there were only 6 inhabitants under the age of 20.

In 1828/1830, there were 147 residents in 16 families, all Catholic.

In 1870, Zdihovo, in Rim's porezna općina, had 28 houses and 177 people. Rim was in Lukovdol parish, but Zdihovo and Liplje were in Bosiljevo parish.

In 1890, Zdihovo itself had 31 houses and 167 people. The villagers of Zdihovo were under Bosiljevo parish. They attended the school in and were administered by Severin and were taxed by Rim.

Village of Zdihovo: Population trends 1857–2021
v

population	195	177	186	167	145	123	131	152	144	137	88	94	60	80	35	28	29
	1857	1869	1880	1890	1900	1910	1921	1931	1948	1953	1961	1971	1981	1991	2001	2011	2021

Note:"Zdihovo Bosiljsko" from 1910 to 1961. Sources: Croatian Bureau of Statistics publications

=== Further reading ===
- Kraljevski zemaljski statistički ured (1903). Političko i sudbeno razdieljenje i Repertorij prebivališta Kraljevina Hrvatske i Slavonije po stanju od 1. travnja 1903. Zagreb: Kraljevska hrvatsko-slavonsko-dalmatinska zemaljska vlada, 🖶 Kraljevska zemaljska tiskara.
- Kraljevski zemaljski statistički ured (May 1913). "Repertorij prebivališta po županijama, upravnim kotarima, gradovima, upravnim i poreznim općinama". Političko i sudbeno razdjeljenje i Repertorij prebivališta Kraljevina Hrvatske i Slavonije po stanju od 1. siječnja 1913. Zagreb: Kraljevska hrvatsko-slavonsko-dalmatinska zemaljska vlada, 🖶 Kraljevska zemaljska tiskara. pp. 1–126. Page 33.

== Politics ==
As of its foundation in 2006, it belongs to the local committee of Severin na Kupi.

== Attractions ==
Zdihovo has a restaurant, Mali Raj.

== Sports ==
The "Gorski Kotar Bike Tour", held annually since 2012, sometimes goes through Zdihovo, such as in the first leg for 2024.

== Infrastructure ==
The water storage unit between Severin na Kupi and Damalj is responsible for Draga Lukovdolska, Močile, Smišljak, Klanac, Plešivica, Rim, Zdihovo and Liplje.

== Gallery ==
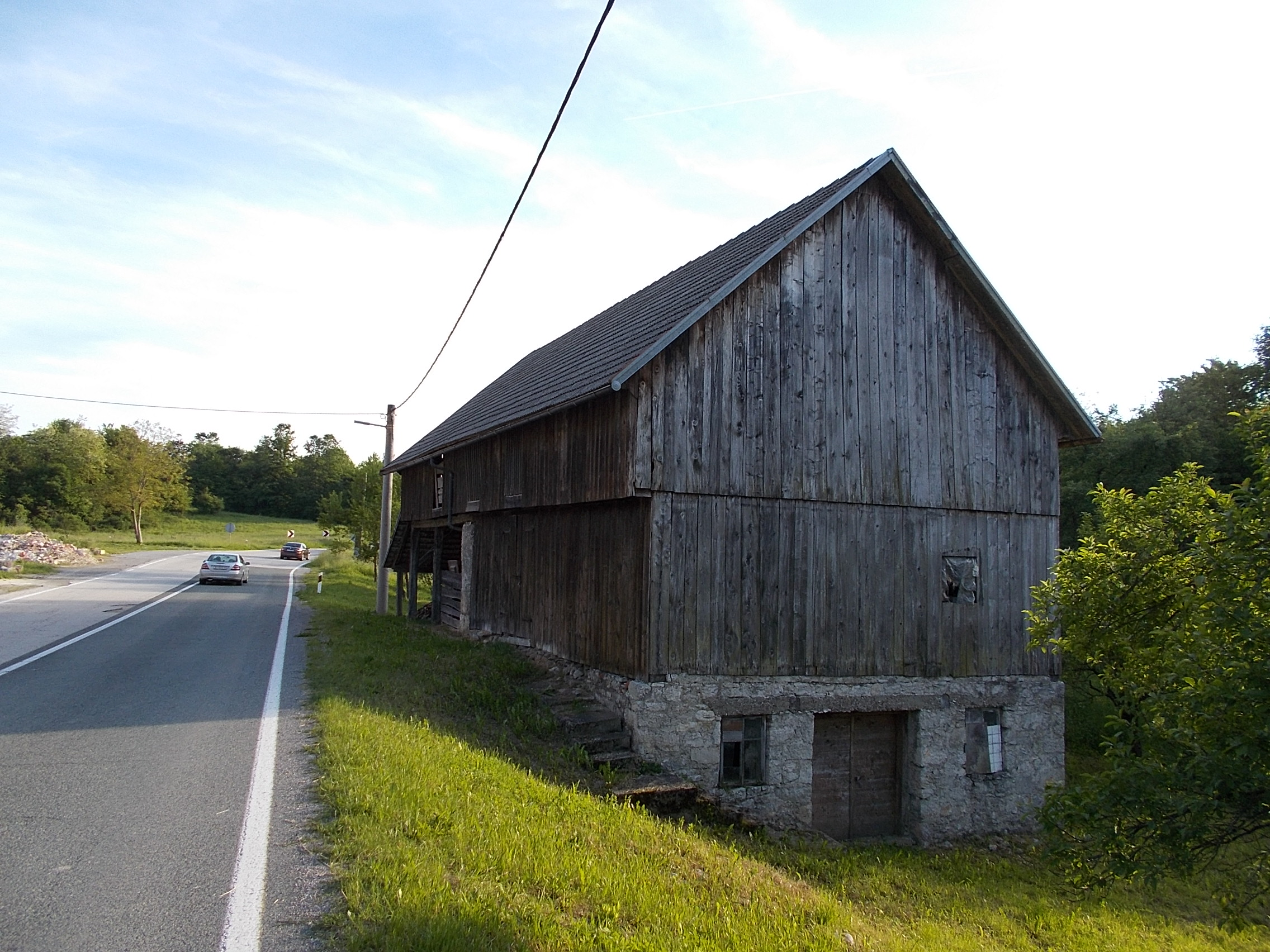
A house in Zdihovo.

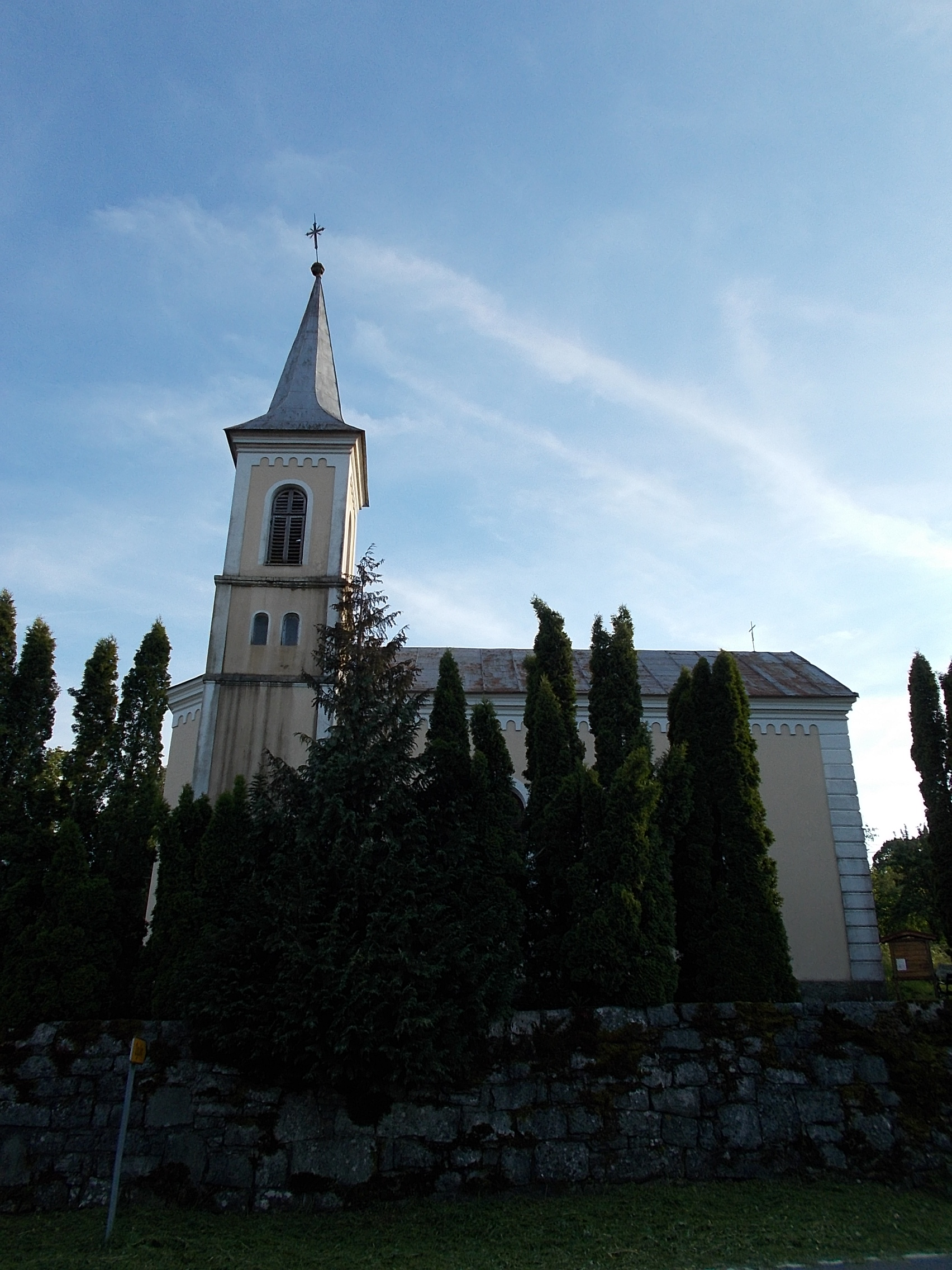
Navještenja Marijinog church.

== Bibliography ==
- Grad Vrbovsko (2021). "Mali Raj, Zdihovo". Visit Vrbovsko. Archived from the original on 2021-04-18.
