= Zalesina =

Coordinates: 45°23′N 14°52′E

Zalesina Zalisina
- Village
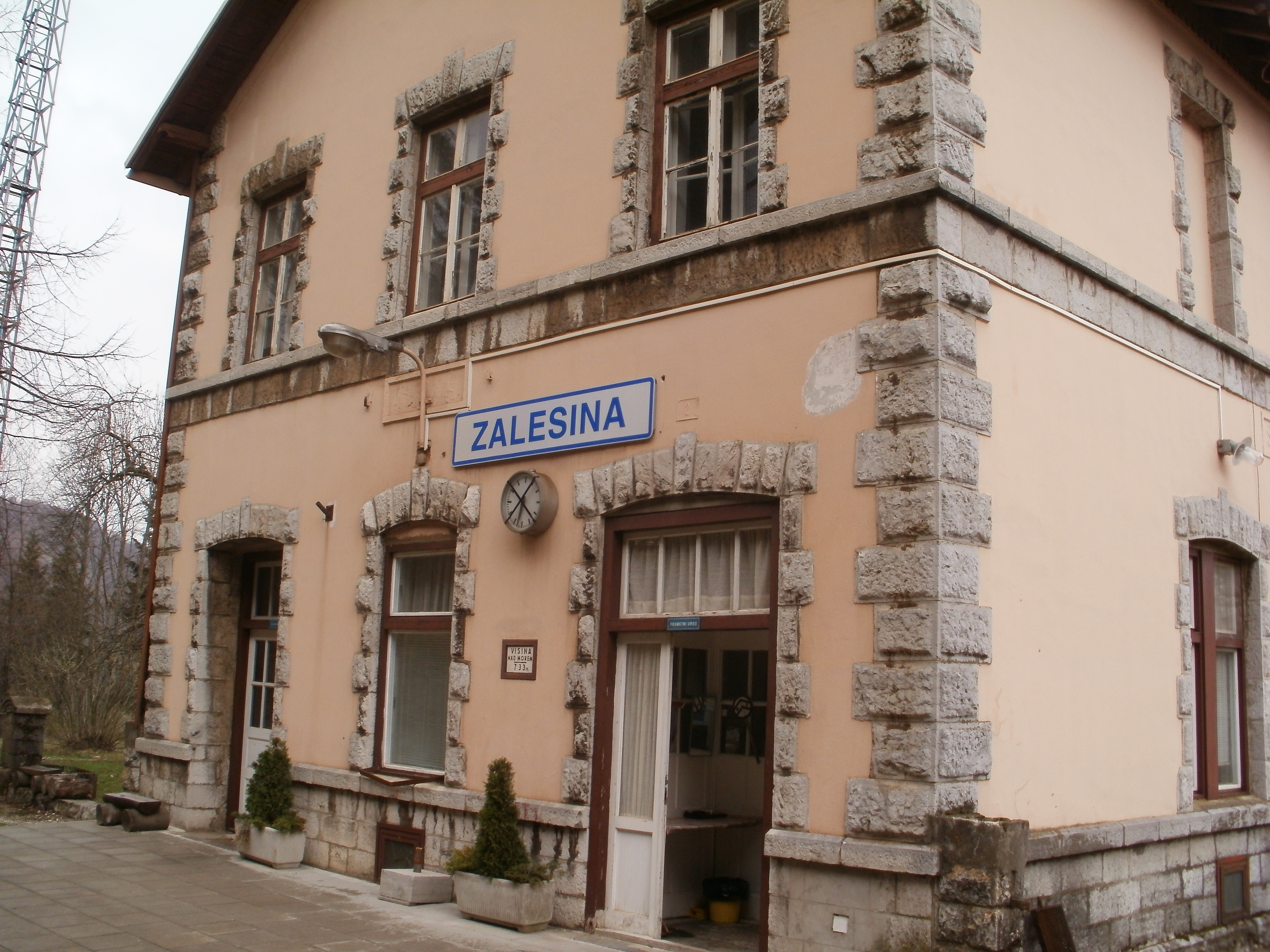
- Train station in Zalesina, Croatia
- Interactive map of Zalesina
- Country: Croatia

Area
  - Total: 7.9 km^{2} (3.1 sq mi)

Population (2021)
  - Total: 31
  - Density: 3.9/km^{2} (10/sq mi)
- Time zone: UTC+1 (CET)
  - Summer (DST): UTC+2 (CEST)

Zalesina is a village in Croatia. It is connected by the D3 highway.

== History ==
In 1860–1879, Matija Mažuranić wrote a 62 folio manuscript today titled Writings on the Building of Roads in Gorski Kotar and Lika (Croatian: Spisi o gradnji cesta u Gorskom Kotaru i Lici), today with signature HR-ZaNSK R 6424.

After the Lujzijana was built, the Družtvo lujzinske ceste constructed an inn in Zalesina together with stables and running water. In 1874, the society would sell all its assets along the road, including those in Zalesina.

From 31 January to 2 February 2014, while S and SW geostrophic wind dominated, freezing rain fell on Gorski Kotar, glazing the entire region. It wrecked roofs, power lines and forests, causing power loss for about 14,000 households in Gorski Kotar, or about 80% of its population. Because of power lines falling on the A6, the highway was closed in of Rijeka between Bosiljevo and Kikovica, and between Kikovica and Delnice in the direction of Zagreb. It took about 10 days to restore essential infrastructure to the region, and within months electricity was back in most of its former range, but at a cost of about 84.4 million HRK to HEP. At the time it was the largest peacetime damage since its Secession from Yugoslavia, even without counting the forestry losses. Clearing blocked forestry roads and forest paths would take years, and thanks to the declining population some were never cleared.

== Climate ==
Between 1981 and 2000, the highest temperature recorded at the local weather station was 31.8 °C (89.2 °F), on 3 August 1981. The coldest temperature was −33.4 °C (−28.1 °F), on 6 January 1985.

== Sports ==
The "Gorski Kotar Bike Tour", held annually since 2012, sometimes goes through Zalesina, such as in the second leg for 2024.

== Gallery ==
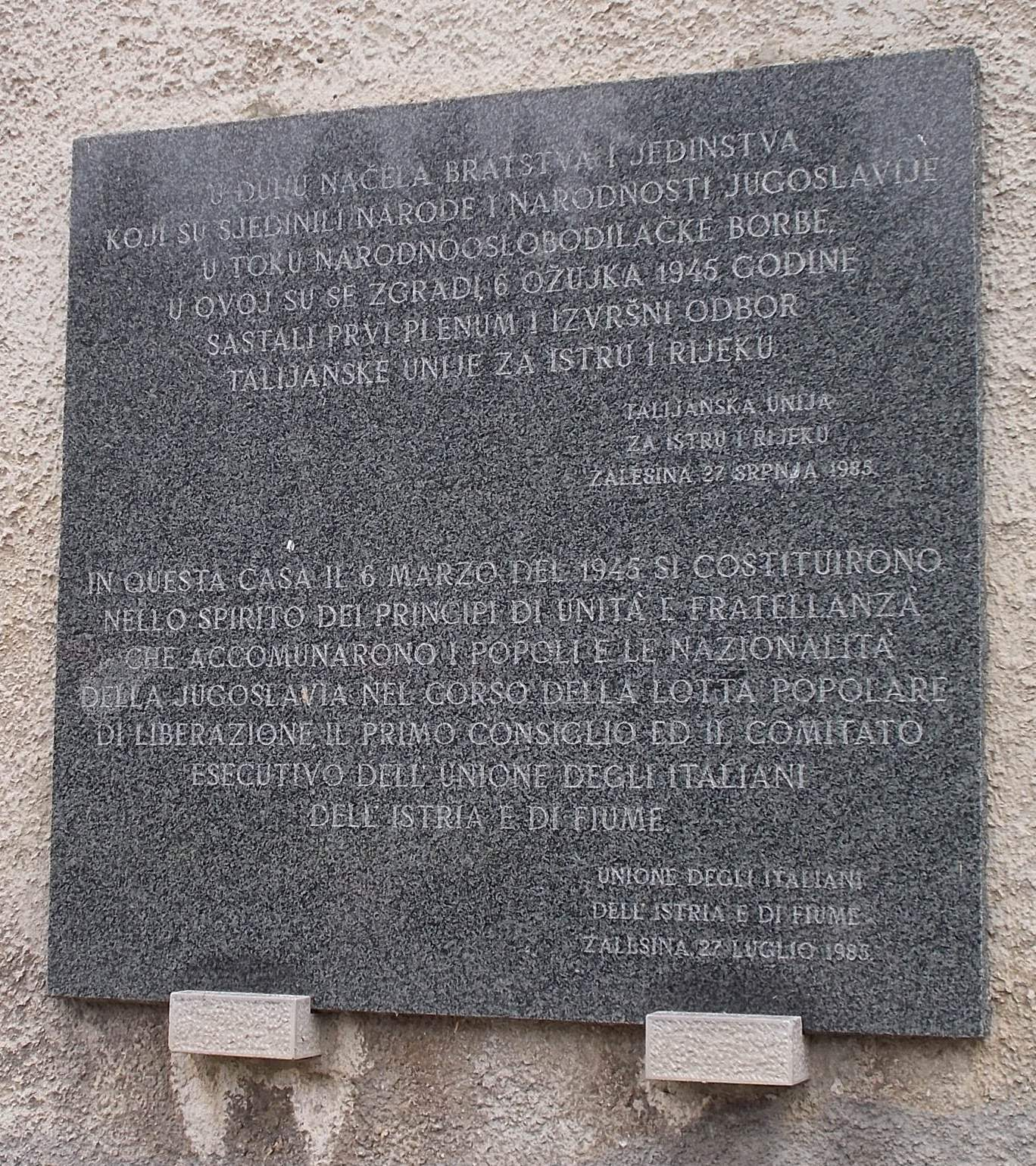
WWII plaque

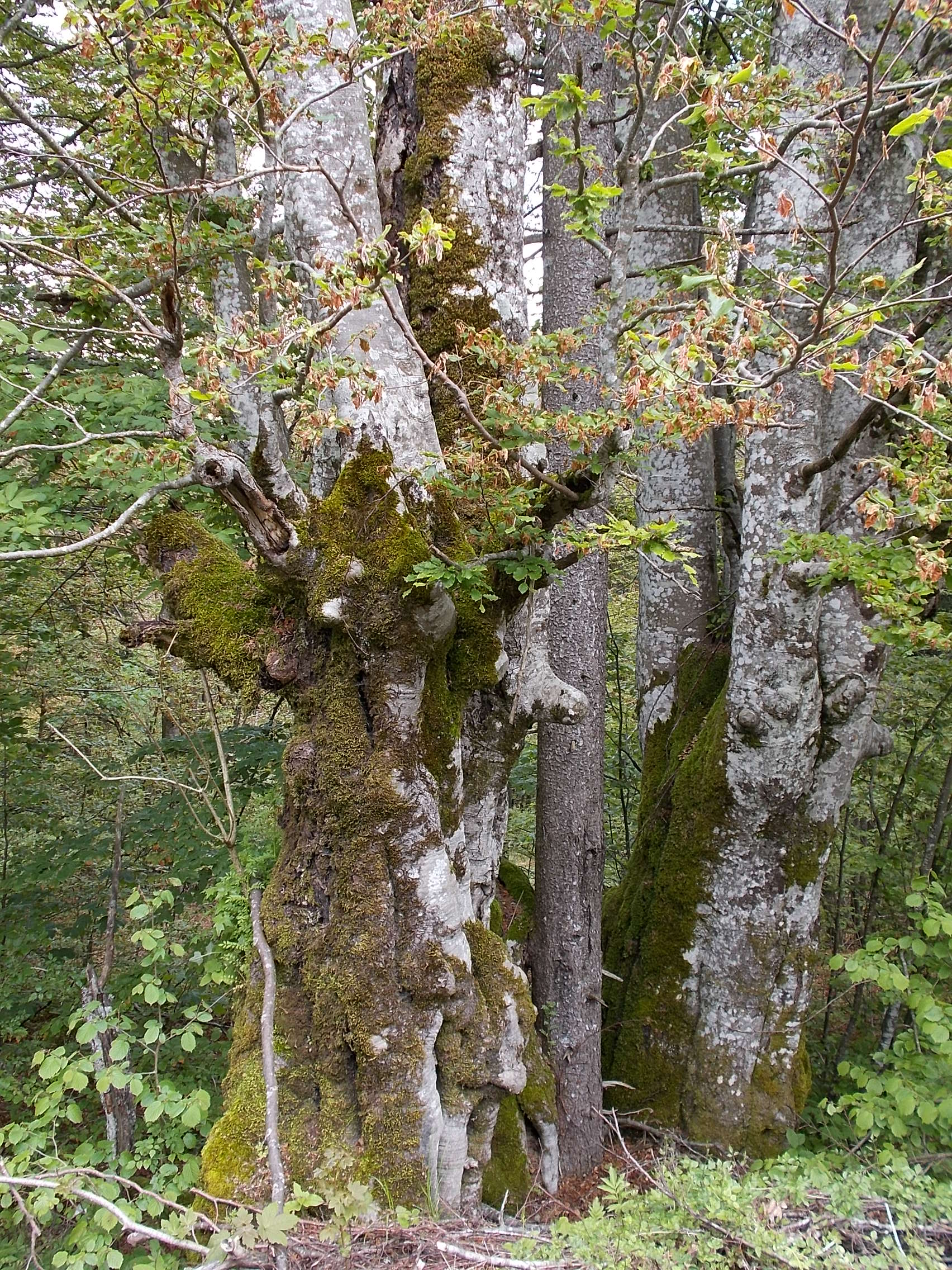
Old beech tree
