= Plešivica, Primorje-Gorski Kotar County =

Plešivica Plešivica Lukovdolska, Lukovdolska Plešivica
- Village
- Interactive map of Plešivica
- Location within Croatia
- Coordinates: 45.417°N 15.193°E
- Country: Croatia
- County: Primorje-Gorski Kotar County
- City: Vrbovsko
- Community: Severin na Kupi

Area
  - Total: 1.7 km^{2} (0.66 sq mi)
- Elevation: 270 m (890 ft)

Population (2021)
  - Total: 8
  - Density: 4.7/km^{2} (12/sq mi)
- Time zone: UTC+1 (CET)
  - Summer (DST): UTC+2 (CEST)
- Postal code: 51326
- Area code: +385 051

Plešivica is a village in Croatia, under the Vrbovsko township, in Primorje-Gorski Kotar County.

== Name ==
The name Plješivica is common for mountains and hills with meadows on top, derived from the adjective plešiv "bare, treeless". The toponym can be either a proper noun or an appellative. Other examples of the proper name include:

- Plješivica (mountain range)
- Plješevica on Bukovica by Bilišane (peak group)
- Plišivica on Brdo by Blato na Cetini (peak)
- Plešivica on Brkini by Sežana (peak and village)
- Plišivica on Crnogorka by Banjevci (peak)
- Plišivica on Crnogorka by Pirovaz (peak)
- Plješivica on Dinara by Golubić (mountain and stream)
- Plešivica on Kostelsko gorje by Žužemberk (peak and village)
- Plješivica on Krpelj by Kamensko (peak)
- Plišivica on Labinštica by Prapatnica (peak)
- Plišivica on Orah by Orah (peak)
- Plišivica on Orlice by Vrpolje (peak)
- Plešivica on Ormoško-Ljutomerska gora by Ljutomer (peak and village)
- Plišivica on Prača by Ljubitovica (peak)
- Pleševica on Velebit by Jablanac (sub-range)
- Plišivica on Svilaja by Zelovo (mountain)
- Plješivica (1634 m) on Velebit by Krasno (peak)
- Pljišivica (1560 m) on Velebit by Krasno (peak)
- Plješevica on Zagrebačka gora by Velika Gora (peak)
- Plešivica on Žumberak by Jastrebarsko (sub-range and village)
- Plješivica on Žumberak by Gornje Prekrižje (peak)
- Plešivica on Žumberak by Noršić Selo (peak)
- Plišivica by Mitlo (hill)
- Plešivica by Čukovec (hamlet)
- Plješevica by Donje Sokolovo (mountain)
- Plišivica by Donji Muć (hill)
- Pleševica by Ervenik (hill)
- Pleševica by Jazvenik (field)
- Plišivica by Kladnjice (mountain)
- Plješevica by Kožlovac (hill)
- Plješivica by Plavno (mountain)
- Plješivica by Radašinovci (peak)
- Plešivica by Severin (village)
- Plešivica by Selnica (hill and village)
- Plješevica by Rogatica (village)
- Plišivica by Tribunj (hill)
- Plješevica by Trijebovo (peak)

== History ==
In 1635, Vuk II Krsto Frankapan gave his serfs Gerga Osojnički, Matijaš Slivec, Mikula Osojnički and Jakov Cajner land in Plešivica.

In 1780, the Report of the Commission for the Introduction of Urbarial Organisation on the Possessions of Klanac, Damalj, Plešivica and Severin na Kupi (Croatian: Izvještaj komisije za uvođenje urbarskog uređenja na posjedima Klanac, Damlja, Plješivica i Severin na Kupi), today with signature HR-ZaNSK R 6687, was drawn up.

Franjo Krušac of Plešivica was listed by SUBNOR as a fallen antifascist soldier in WWII. In May 1945, Mike Osojnicki of Chicago son of immigrant Matej Osojnički, whose family originated in Osojnik, served in the 151st Infantry Regiment of the United States Army, and was mortally wounded in the Pacific Theatre, dying 21 May.

On 11 August 2012, drought caused a loss of tap water in Severin na Kupi, Draga Lukovdolska, Močile, Smišljak, Damalj, Klanac, Plešivica, Rim, Zdihovo and Liplje.

Plešivica was hit by the 2014 Dinaric ice storm.

On 18 July 2023, the wind of a thunderstorm left Plešivica without power.

== Demographics ==
As of 2021, there were no inhabitants under the age of 20.

In 1828/1830, there were 108 residents in 10 families, all Catholic.

Village of Plešivica: Population trends 1857–2021
v

population	145	125	140	126	107	89	68	67	71	68	53	66	56	52	27	11	8
	1857	1869	1880	1890	1900	1910	1921	1931	1948	1953	1961	1971	1981	1991	2001	2011	2021

Note:Iskazivano pod imenom Plešivica do 1900., Plešivica Lukovdolska od 1910. do 1961. i Plešivica od 1971. nadalje. U I. izdanju knjige Naselja Sources: Croatian Bureau of Statistics publications

In 1870, Plešivica, in Klanac's porezna općina, had 17 houses and 125 people.

In 1890, Plešivica had 21 houses and 126 people. Its villagers were under Lukovdol parish and school districts, but were taxed by Klanac and administered by Severin.

== Politics ==
As of its foundation on 3 March 2008, it belongs to the local committee of Severin na Kupi.

== Infrastructure ==
The water storage unit between Severin na Kupi and Damalj is responsible for Draga Lukovdolska, Močile, Smišljak, Klanac, Plešivica, Rim, Zdihovo and Liplje.

== Bibliography ==
- Martinković (1854-04-10) [written 1854-03-14]. "Poziv od strane ureda c. kr. podžupani karlovačke nižepodpisani vojnoj dužnosti podvèrženi momci". Carsko kraljevske službene narodne novine (in Serbo-Croatian). Vol. 20, no. 82. p. 217. ISSN 1333-5243.
- Podžupan (1859-07-27) [written 1859-06-14]. "Poziv". Carsko kraljevske službene narodne novine (in Serbo-Croatian). Vol. 20, no. 170. pp. 433–434. ISSN 1333-5243.
- Korenčić, Mirko (1979). Naselja i stanovništvo Socijalističke Republike Hrvatske (1857–1971) [Villages and Population of the Socialist Republic of Croatia (1857–1971)]. Djela Jugoslavenske akademije znanosti i umjetnosti (in Serbo-Croatian). Vol. 54.
