= Smišljak, Vrbovsko =

Smišljak
- Village
- Interactive map of Smišljak
- Coordinates: 45°24′N 15°10′E
- Country: Croatia
- County: Primorje-Gorski Kotar
- Community: Severin na Kupi

Area
  - Total: 2.8 km^{2} (1.1 sq mi)
- Elevation: 222 m (728 ft)

Population (2021)
  - Total: 13
  - Density: 4.6/km^{2} (12/sq mi)
- Time zone: UTC+1 (CET)
  - Summer (DST): UTC+2 (CEST)

Smišljak or Smišljak Lukovdolski is a settlement in Croatia, part of the town of Vrbovsko.

== History ==
Construction on the Črnomelj-Vrbovsko railway begun in 1939, but by 1940 it had come to a halt thanks to a worker dispute. Thanks to the outbreak of WWI, it was never finished.

On 11 August 2012, drought caused the depletion of water from the storage unit responsible for tap water in Severin na Kupi, Draga Lukovdolska, Močile, Smišljak, Damalj, Klanac, Plešivica, Rim, Zdihovo and Liplje.

Smišljak was hit by the 2014 Dinaric ice storm.

== Demographics ==
As of 2021, the only inhabitant under the age of 20 was a single teenage girl.

Village of Smišljak: Population trends 1857–2021
v

population	87	77	69	71	66	47	42	64	60	51	48	47	43	33	26	21	13
	1857	1869	1880	1890	1900	1910	1921	1931	1948	1953	1961	1971	1981	1991	2001	2011	2021

Note:Called Lukovdolski Smišljak from 1910 to 1970. Sources: Croatian Bureau of Statistics publications

In 1870, Smišljak had 10 houses and 77 people.

In 1890, Smišljak had 15 houses and 71 people. Its villagers were under Lukovdol parish and school districts, but were taxed by Jadrč Mali and administered by Severin.

=== Further reading ===
- Kraljevski zemaljski statistički ured (1903). Političko i sudbeno razdieljenje i Repertorij prebivališta Kraljevina Hrvatske i Slavonije po stanju od 1. travnja 1903. Zagreb: Kraljevska hrvatsko-slavonsko-dalmatinska zemaljska vlada, 🖶 Kraljevska zemaljska tiskara.
- Kraljevski zemaljski statistički ured (May 1913). "Repertorij prebivališta po županijama, upravnim kotarima, gradovima, upravnim i poreznim općinama". Političko i sudbeno razdjeljenje i Repertorij prebivališta Kraljevina Hrvatske i Slavonije po stanju od 1. siječnja 1913. Zagreb: Kraljevska hrvatsko-slavonsko-dalmatinska zemaljska vlada, 🖶 Kraljevska zemaljska tiskara. pp. 1–126. Page 33.

== Politics ==
As of its foundation in 2006, it belongs to the local committee of Severin na Kupi.

== Sports ==
Beginning in 2013, the 7 stage 260 kilometres (160 mi) long Cycling Trail of Gorski Kotar (Croatian: Goranska biciklistička transverzala) passes through Smišljak.

== Infrastructure ==
The water storage unit between Severin na Kupi and Damalj is responsible for Draga Lukovdolska, Močile, Smišljak, Klanac, Plešivica, Rim, Zdihovo and Liplje.

== Bibliography ==
=== History ===
- Korenčić, Mirko (1979). Naselja i stanovništvo Socijalističke Republike Hrvatske (1857–1971) [Villages and Population of the Socialist Republic of Croatia (1857–1971)]. Djela Jugoslavenske akademije znanosti i umjetnosti (in Serbo-Croatian). Vol. 54.
- Banska vlast Banovine Hrvatske (1940d). "Socijalna zaštita radništva". Godišnjak banske vlasti Banovine Hrvatske (in Croatian). Vol. 1. pp. 229–241.

=== Linguistics ===
- Marinković, Marina; Zubčić, Sanja (2017-01-26). "Fonologija mjesnoga govora Smišljaka u istočnome Gorskom kotaru". Fluminensia: časopis za filološka istraživanja. 28 (2): 7–26. eISSN 1848-9680.
