= Liplje, Vrbovsko =

Settlement in Primorje-Gorski Kotar County, Croatia

Liplje Liplje Bosiljevačko
- Settlement
- Interactive map of Liplje
- Location of Liplje in Croatia
- Coordinates: 45°25′N 15°13′E
- Country: Croatia
- County: Primorje-Gorski Kotar
- City: Vrbovsko
- Community: Severin na Kupi

Area
  - Total: 1.8 km^{2} (0.69 sq mi)
- Elevation: 237 m (778 ft)

Population (2021)
  - Total: 58
  - Density: 32/km^{2} (83/sq mi)
- Time zone: UTC+1 (CET)
  - Summer (DST): UTC+2 (CEST)
- Postal code: 51326 Vrbovsko
- Area code: +385 (0)51

Liplje or Liplje Bosiljevačko is a settlement in the City of Vrbovsko in Croatia. In 2021, its population was 58.

== History ==
Pavle Pavlinić and Jakov Ribić of Liplje were listed by SUBNOR as fallen antifascist soldiers in WWII.

On 11 August 2012, drought caused a loss of tap water in Severin na Kupi, Draga Lukovdolska, Močile, Smišljak, Damalj, Klanac, Plešivica, Rim, Zdihovo and Liplje.

Liplje was hit by the 2014 Dinaric ice storm.

On 18 July 2023, the wind of a thunderstorm left Liplje without power.

== Demographics ==
As of 2021, there were only 5 inhabitants under the age of 20.

In 1828/1830, there were 147 residents in 15 families, all Catholic.

In 1870, Liplje, in Rim's porezna općina, had 27 houses and 196 people. Rim was in Lukovdol parish, but Zdihovo and Liplje were in Bosiljevo parish.

In 1890, Liplje itself had 35 houses and 191 people. The villagers of Liplje were under Bosiljevo parish. They attended the school in and were administered by Severin and were taxed by Rim.

Village of Liplje: Population trends 1857–2021
v

population	173	196	209	191	148	134	139	166	177	166	121	117	105	90	63	62	58
	1857	1869	1880	1890	1900	1910	1921	1931	1948	1953	1961	1971	1981	1991	2001	2011	2021

Note:It was reported as Liplje until 1900, Lipje Bosiljevsko from 1910 to 1970, and again Liplje from 1971 onwards. Sources: Croatian Bureau of Statistics publications

=== Further reading ===
- Kraljevski zemaljski statistički ured (1903). Političko i sudbeno razdieljenje i Repertorij prebivališta Kraljevina Hrvatske i Slavonije po stanju od 1. travnja 1903. Zagreb: Kraljevska hrvatsko-slavonsko-dalmatinska zemaljska vlada, 🖶 Kraljevska zemaljska tiskara.
- Kraljevski zemaljski statistički ured (May 1913). "Repertorij prebivališta po županijama, upravnim kotarima, gradovima, upravnim i poreznim općinama". Političko i sudbeno razdjeljenje i Repertorij prebivališta Kraljevina Hrvatske i Slavonije po stanju od 1. siječnja 1913. Zagreb: Kraljevska hrvatsko-slavonsko-dalmatinska zemaljska vlada, 🖶 Kraljevska zemaljska tiskara. pp. 1–126. Page 33.

== Politics ==
As of its foundation in 2006, it belongs to the local committee of Severin na Kupi.

== Infrastructure ==
The water storage unit between Severin na Kupi and Damalj is responsible for Draga Lukovdolska, Močile, Smišljak, Klanac, Plešivica, Rim, Zdihovo and Liplje.
