= Bosanci, Croatia =

Coordinates: 45°26′35″N 15°15′50″E

Bosanci
- Village
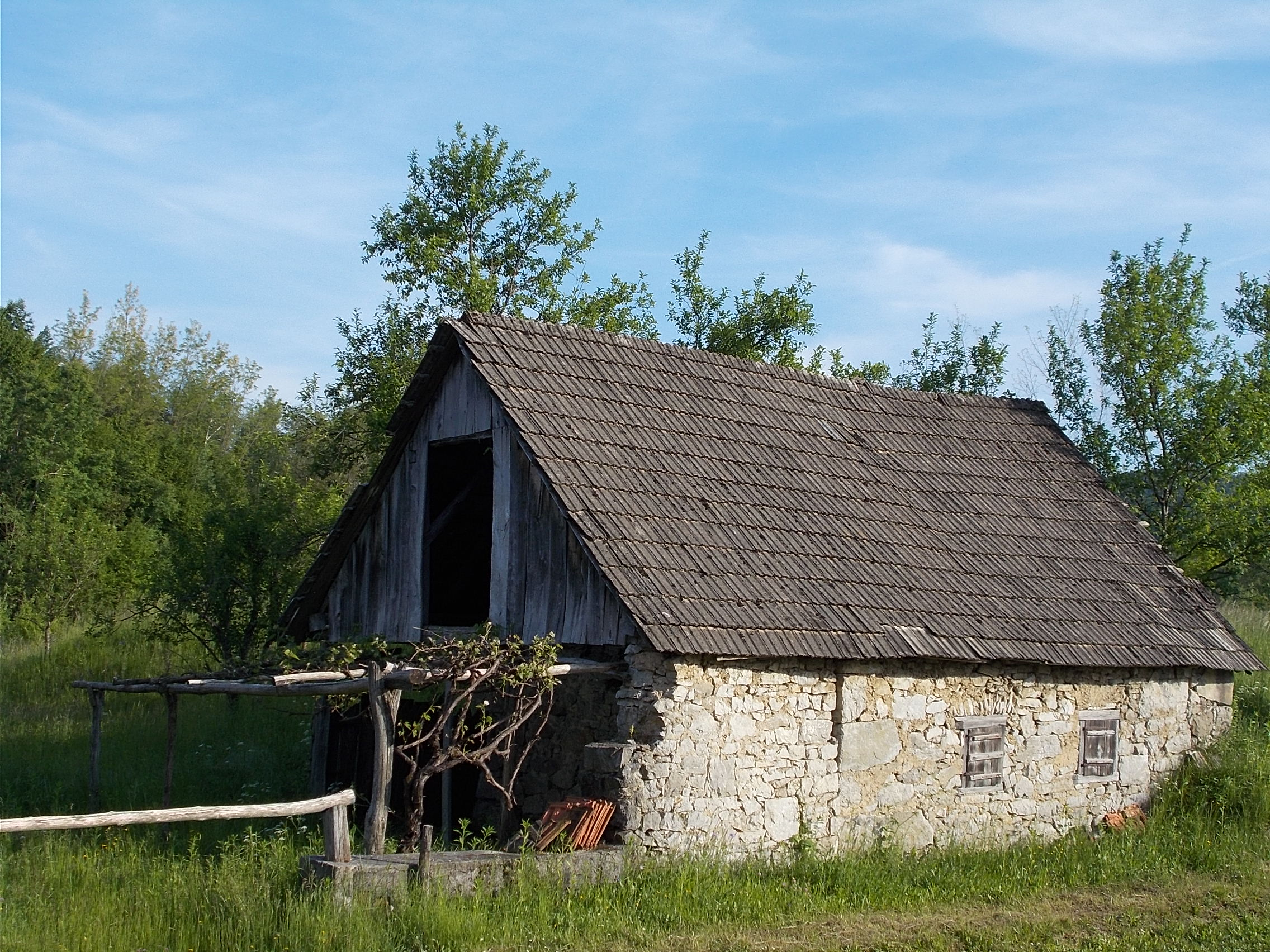
- House in Bosanci
- Interactive map of Bosanci
- Country: Croatia
- County: Karlovac County

Area
  - Total: 1.6 km^{2} (0.62 sq mi)

Population (2021)
  - Total: 42
  - Density: 26/km^{2} (68/sq mi)
- Time zone: UTC+1 (CET)
  - Summer (DST): UTC+2 (CEST)

Bosanci is a village in Croatia.

== History ==
In 1860–1879, Matija Mažuranić wrote a 62 folio manuscript today titled Writings on the Building of Roads in Gorski Kotar and Lika (Croatian: Spisi o gradnji cesta u Gorskom Kotaru i Lici), today with signature HR-ZaNSK R 6424. A 21 folio manuscript dated 1872 titled Darstellung der Entstehung des Baues ... der Luisenstrasse togethr with a translation by I. Mikloušić is kept as HR-ZaNSK R 4572.

After the Lujzijana was built, the Družtvo lujzinske ceste constructed an inn in Bosanci together. In 1874, the society would sell all its assets along the road, including those in Bosanci.

In 1864, the rinderpest epidemic reached Bosanci, having just subsided in Gornja Kupčina, Zamršje and Čeglje. The Lujzijana was therefore closed to horned traffic for 21 days in December.

== Attractions ==
There is a restaurant in Bosanci, Bosiljevo, opened by Marija and Ivica Frketić in 2000, children of Biserka Frketić (who once operated the Rim restaurant in nearby Rim). It became popular for surviving the 2004–2015 period after the opening of the A1 highway, during which many restaurants along the Lujzijana closed down.

== Gallery ==
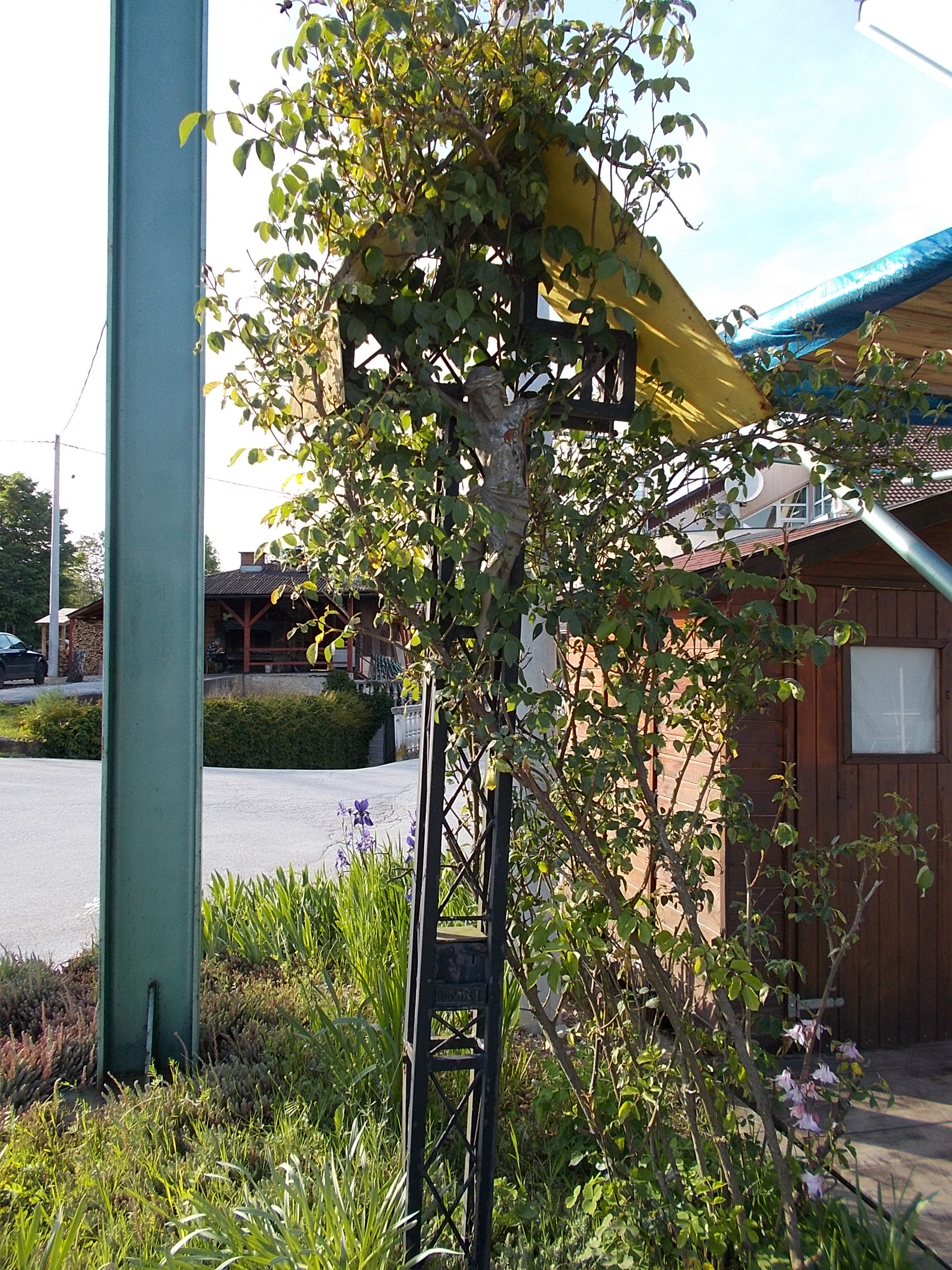
Crucifix in Bosanci

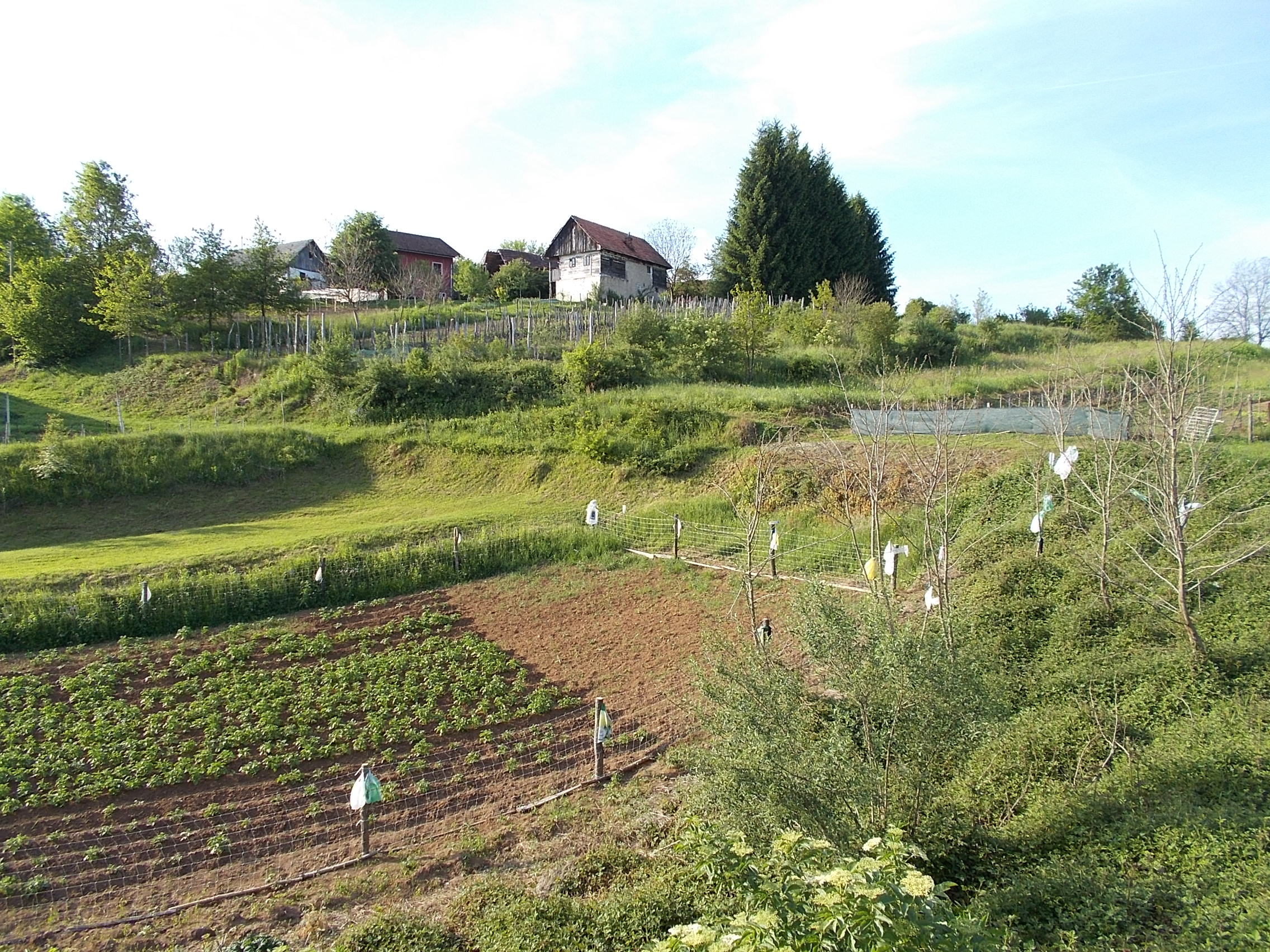
Village from Bosiljevo-Bosanci road

== Bibliography ==
- Podžupan (1859-07-27) [written 1859-06-14]. "Poziv". Carsko kraljevske službene narodne novine (in Serbo-Croatian). Vol. 20, no. 170. pp. 433–434. ISSN 1333-5243.
- Badurina, Edvard (2022-09-15). "Restoran Bosiljevo - dom janjećih i svinjskih užitaka". Visit Vrbovsko (in Serbo-Croatian). Archived from the original on 2022-09-29.
