= Zamršje =

Coordinates: 45°31′N 15°42′E

- Village
- Interactive map of Zamršje
- Country: Croatia
- County: Karlovac County

Area
  - Total: 6.0 km^{2} (2.3 sq mi)

Population (2021)
  - Total: 144
  - Density: 24/km^{2} (62/sq mi)
- Time zone: UTC+1 (CET)
  - Summer (DST): UTC+2 (CEST)

Zamršje is a village in Croatia. It is connected by the D36 highway. There were 219 inhabitants living in 2001.
