= Gornja Kupčina =

- Location within Croatia
- Coordinates: 45°37′59″N 15°34′17″E
- Country: Croatia
- County: Zagreb County
- City: Jastrebarsko

Area
  - Total: 11.1 km^{2} (4.3 sq mi)

Population (2021)
  - Total: 139
  - Density: 12.5/km^{2} (32.4/sq mi)
- Time zone: UTC+1 (CET)
  - Summer (DST): UTC+2 (CEST)

Gornja Kupčina is a village near Jastrebarsko, Croatia, around 30 km west of Zagreb. Its population in 2011 was 148.
