= Damelj =

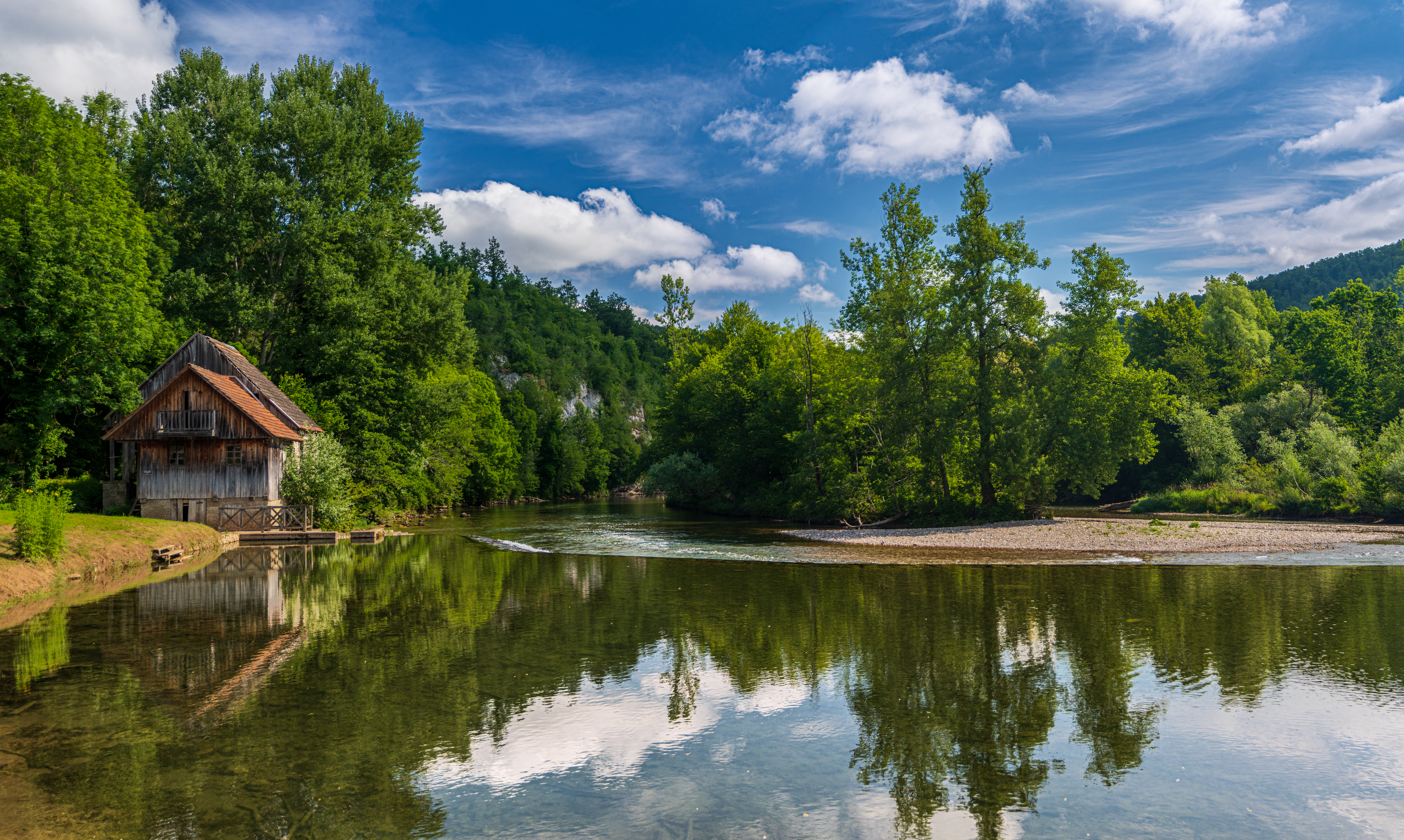
- The village mill

- Location in Slovenia
- Coordinates: 45°25′59.29″N 15°11′9.37″E
- Country: Slovenia
- Traditional region: White Carniola
- Statistical region: Southeast Slovenia
- Municipality: Črnomelj

Area
  - Total: 3.78 km^{2} (1.46 sq mi)
- Elevation: 208.2 m (683 ft)

Population (2020)
  - Total: 37
  - Density: 9.8/km^{2} (25/sq mi)
- Postal code: 8344

Damelj (pronounced [ˈdaːməl]; German: Damel) is a settlement above the left bank of the Kolpa River in the Municipality of Črnomelj in the White Carniola area of southeastern Slovenia. The area is part of the traditional region of Lower Carniola and is now included in the Southeast Slovenia Statistical Region.

The local church is dedicated to Saint Michael and belongs to the Parish of Vinica. It is a Gothic building that was restyled in 1664. The main altar dates to the late 17th century.

== Sports ==
The Gorski Kotar Bike Tour, held annually since 2012, sometimes goes through Damelj, such as in the first leg for 2024.
