= Čeglje =

Coordinates: 45°37′N 15°36′E

- Village
- Interactive map of Čeglje
- Country: Croatia
- County: Zagreb County
- Town: Jastrebarsko

Area
  - Total: 9.0 km^{2} (3.5 sq mi)

Population (2021)
  - Total: 353
  - Density: 39/km^{2} (100/sq mi)
- Time zone: UTC+1 (CET)
  - Summer (DST): UTC+2 (CEST)

Čeglje is a village in Croatia. It is connected by the D1 highway. The village belongs to the Jastrebarsko administrative area, and according to 2001 figures, its population is of 445 (living in 132 households). Čeglje is situated right on the administrative border with Karlovac County. The village has a small church called Saint Mary Christian helper.
