= Kasuni =

Coordinates: 45°26′49″N 15°15′36″E

- Village
- Interactive map of Kasuni
- Country: Croatia
- County: Karlovac County

Area
  - Total: 0.7 km^{2} (0.27 sq mi)

Population (2021)
  - Total: 49
  - Density: 70/km^{2} (180/sq mi)
- Time zone: UTC+1 (CET)
  - Summer (DST): UTC+2 (CEST)

Kasuni is a village in Croatia.

== History ==
In 1864, the rinderpest epidemic reached Kasuni, having just subsided in Gornja Kupčina, Zamršje and Čeglje. The Lujzijana was therefore closed to horned traffic for 21 days in December.

On 12 July 1942, there was a battle in Kasuni between a group of about 80 Partisans and the Domobrani with gendarmes while the Partisans were trying to cross over to the left bank of the Kupa.

== Bibliography ==
- Martinković (1854-04-10) [written 1854-03-14]. "Poziv od strane ureda c. kr. podžupani karlovačke nižepodpisani vojnoj dužnosti podvèrženi momci". Carsko kraljevske službene narodne novine (in Serbo-Croatian). Vol. 20, no. 82. p. 217. ISSN 1333-5243.
- Podžupan (1859-07-27) [written 1859-06-14]. "Poziv". Carsko kraljevske službene narodne novine (in Serbo-Croatian). Vol. 20, no. 170. pp. 433–434. ISSN 1333-5243.
- Trgo, Fabijan, ed. (1964). Zbornik dokumenata i podataka o Narodno-oslobodilačkom ratu Jugoslovenskih naroda. Vol. V, 32.
