= Louisiana road (Croatia) =

Historic road in Croatia

Route information
- Length: 141 km (88 mi)
- Existed: 1809–present

Major junctions
- From: Rijeka
- To: Karlovac

Location
- Country: Croatia

Highway system
- Highways in Croatia

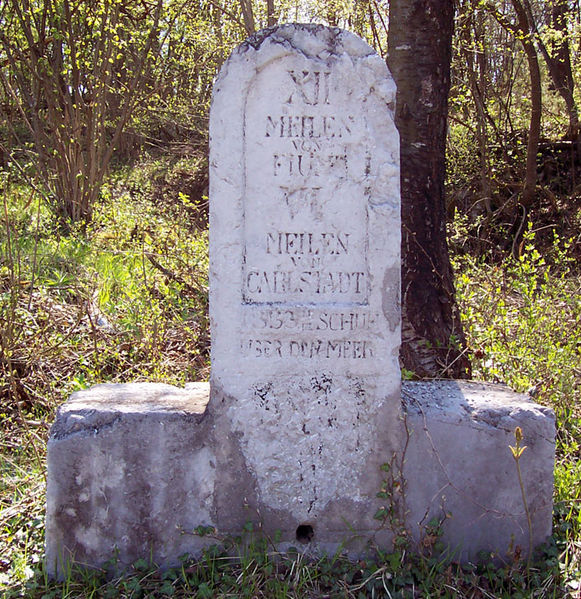
A milestone on Lujzijana near the village of Nadvučnik

The Louisiana road (Croatian: Lujzijana, Lujzinska cesta) is a roadway in Croatia, built between 1803 and 1812 by an association of noble families (Lichtenstein, Dietrichstein, Esterházy, Harrach, Batthyány, Anna Maria Erdődy) and designed by Josef Philipp Vukassovich. The road was finished by the French Empire. It is named after Napoleon's second wife Marie Louise.

It linked Rijeka with Karlovac through Grobničko polje, Kamenjak, Gornje Jelenje, Lokve, Delnice, Skrad, Stubica, Severin na Kupi, and Netretić. The length of the Louisiana road was 18 Austrian miles (1 mile = 7.585 km). It was about 8 m wide (26 Wiener Fuß). It was the shortest route between Rijeka and Karlovac, and was one of the most modern roads in the empire. With the building of the Lujzijana, the Karolina road became less important.

== History ==
After the Lujzijana was built, the Družtvo lujzinske ceste constructed a number of inns along it to provide it with the necessary infrastructure and maintenance income. The inns from Rijeka to Karlovac: Hrast, Zagradište near Kamenjak, Kamenjak (with stable and large cistern), Škrobutnjak (with stables and 2 cisterns), Jelenje (with stables and 2 cisterns), Hundsberg by Bakar, Osoje (with stables and cistern), Mrzla Vodica (with stables), Mala Voda (with stables), Sopač (2 houses with cistern), Delnice, Zalisina (with stables and running water), Skrad (with stables and aqueduct), Vučinić Selo (with stables and running water), Lovnik, Vučnik, Severin, Zdihovo, Bosance, Vukova Gorica (with stable and cistern), Stative, and Borlin. In 1874, the society would sell all its assets along the road, including those in Jelenje.

In 1864, a rinderpest outbreak in Bosanci and Kasuni caused the Lujzijana to be closed to horned traffic for 21 days in December.
