= National and University Library in Zagreb =

National library of Croatia and central library of the University of Zagreb

Coordinates: 45°47′48″N 15°58′39″E

- Nacionalna i sveučilišna knjižnica u Zagrebu
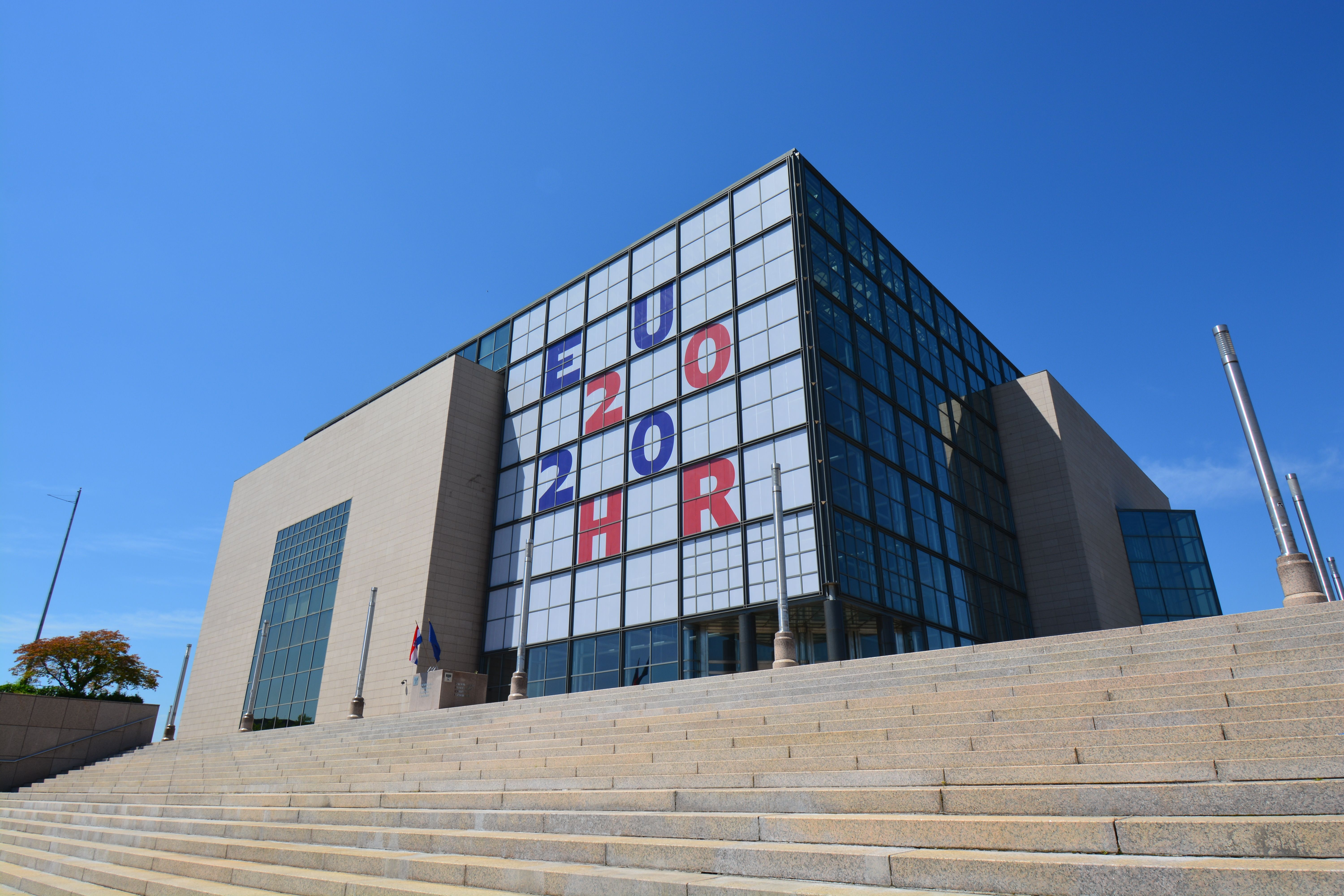
- National and University Library building in 2020
- Location: Zagreb, Croatia
- Established: 1607 (419 years ago)
- Architects: Marijan Hržić, Zvonimir Krznarić, Davor Mance, Velimir Neidhardt

Collection
- Size: 3 million items
- Legal deposit: Yes, since 1816

Access and use
- Population served: 357,291 (2011); 718,850 online (2011)
- Members: 19,360

Other information
- Director: Ivanka Stričević
- Website: www.nsk.hr/en/

National and University Library in Zagreb (NSK) (Croatian: Nacionalna i sveučilišna knjižnica u Zagrebu, NSK; formerly Nacionalna i sveučilišna biblioteka u Zagrebu, NSB) is the national library of Croatia and central library of the University of Zagreb.

The Library was established in 1607. Its primary mission is the development and preservation of Croatian national written heritage. It holds around 3 million items.

Since 1995 the NSK has been located in a purpose-built cubical building in central Zagreb.

== Services ==
Services provided include lending and reference services (bibliographic-reference and catalogue information, subject search, science citation index search); interlibrary loan; national bibliographic database; IT services (reprographic services, microfilming, digitization, use of computer equipment); and learning programmes for users. Exhibitions are mounted, and parts of the Library's premises may be leased.

== The Library in numbers ==
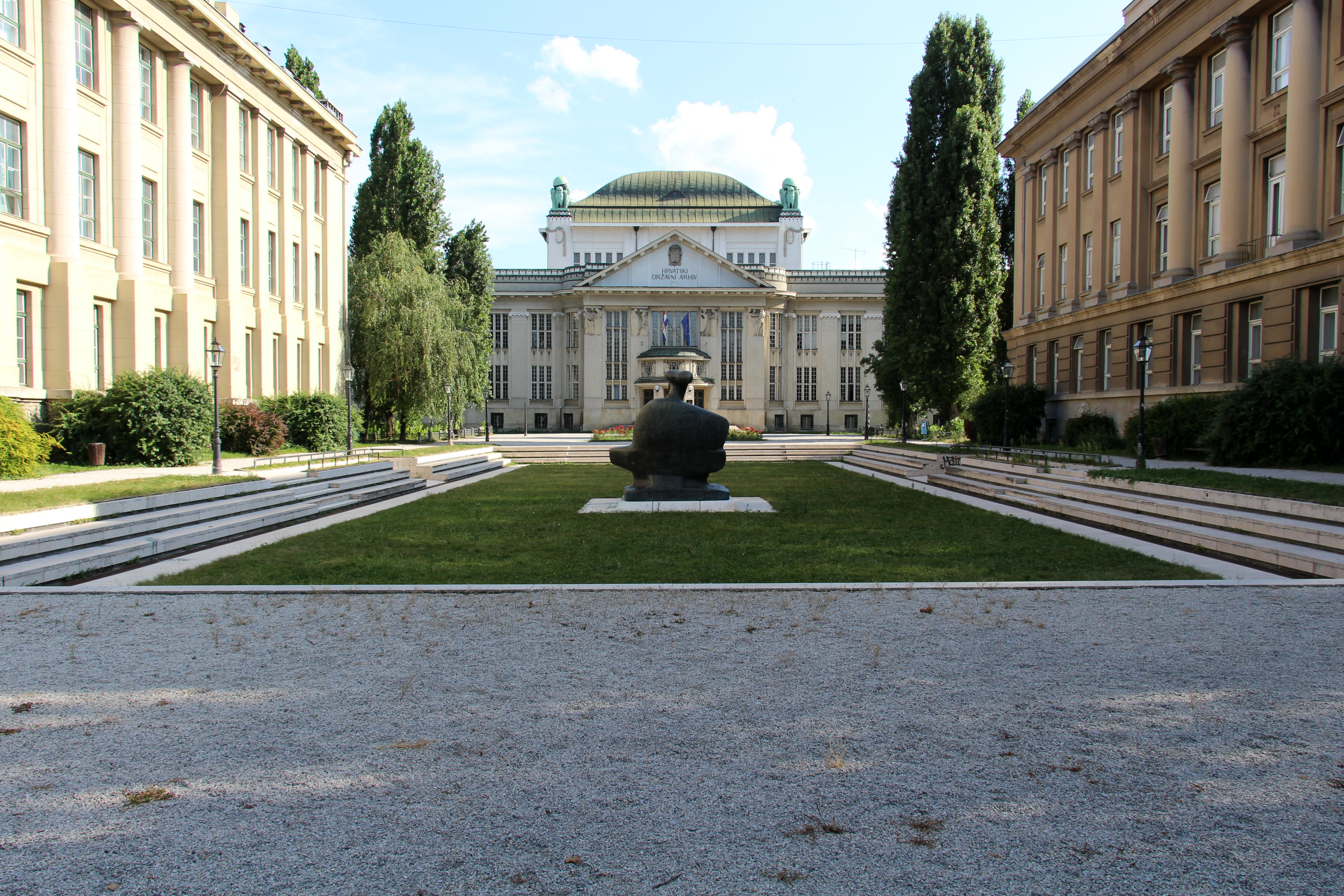
The old National and University Library on Marulić Square in Zagreb, today the Croatian State Archives

=== Holdings ===
Library's total holdings: approximately 3.5 million items

- New items acquired in 2018 through regular acquisition and legal deposit procedures:
- Croatian monographs: 14,192 items
- Croatian serial publications: 37,657 items
- Special book material: 733 items
- Non-book material: 963 items
- Music: 1,715 items
- Electronic resources: 550 items

=== Premises ===
- Net floor area: 36,478 m2
- Gross floor area: 44,432m2
- Closed stacks: 110,000m of mobile shelving
- Open Access Reading Rooms: 12,900m of shelving

=== User facilities ===
- 1,100 seats
- 64 seats in Special Collections Reading Rooms
- 8 audio booths
- 7 rooms for individual study
- 2 rooms for group study
- 10 study cubicles
- 100-seat conference room
- 150 seats in the late hours reading room (21.00 – 24.00)

=== User statistics (2018) ===
- Registered users: 10,537
- Active memberships: 15,056
- Library visitors: 169,059
- Visitors using late hours study services: 14,160
- Online visits: 496,671
- Unique online visitors: 247,688
- Online pages visited: 2,118,307

== Tasks ==
Some of the principal tasks of the Library are:

1. the assembling and organizing of the Croatian national collection of library materials and the coordination of the acquisition of international scientific works at both the national and the university level,
2. the preservation and restoration of library materials in the context of the international Preservation and Conservation programme (PAC),
3. the promotion of Croatian printed and electronic publications,
4. the integration of the Library's bibliographic activities and information services into international programmes,
5. the organization of the Library as the centre of the library system of the Republic of Croatia and the University of Zagreb,
6. scientific research in the field of library and information sciences,
7. publishing and various promotional activities and the organization of exhibitions.

== Collections ==
=== Digital collections ===
- NSK Digital Collections (Croatian version only)
- Historical Newspapers
- Historical Journals
- Croatian Web Archive
- Croatian Digital Dissertations Repository
- Croatian Digital Theses Repository
- Sounds of the Past

=== Special collections ===
- The Manuscripts and Old Books Collection

The Collection assembles, preserves, processes and makes available the items from the richest Croatian collection of national manuscripts and old books, as well as the manuscripts and numerous rare and old books belonging to other cultures.

The Manuscripts and Old Books Collection contains a vast legacy of manuscripts – correspondence including nearly 100,000 letters and 3,670 call numbers for individual manuscripts (1,720 in Croatian, 920 in Latin, 454 in German, 230 in Italian, etc.). The Collection also includes the photographic collection containing 865 items. In total the Collection contains 9,236 items (10,295 volumes).

- The Print Collection

Valuable drawings and prints have constituted a significant part of the holdings of the National and University Library in Zagreb since the foundation of the Library four hundred years ago, while the Print Collection, as a separate organizational unit of the Library, was established in 1919. Apart from being the oldest Croatian collection of this type, the Print Collection of the National and University Library in Zagreb is also the largest print collection in Croatia. In addition to the works by many great names of the Croatian visual arts, the holdings of the Collection include works by numerous leading world artists.

The collection includes works by the 16th-century artist Andrija Medulić, architectural drawings by Johann Bernhard Fischer von Erlach from the 18th century, and many more modern Croatian artists.

- The Map Collection

The Collection assembles, preserves, processes and makes available all types of maps and atlases. Special attention is given to older and more valuable cartographic items, national cartographic materials and the control of legal deposit procedures. The members of the Collection supply users with information in the field of cartography and provide professional assistance for researchers and students in the preparation and writing of their papers, articles or theses.

The Collection comprises nearly 42,000 maps, almost 1,500 atlases, and approximately 600 books in the accompanying reference library.

- The Music Collection

The Collection assembles, processes, archives and makes available sheet music, the rich legacy of Croatian composers as well as a large stock of sound recordings. All materials in the collection are available to the users of the National and University Library in Zagreb and they include nearly 17,000 printed music scores, 3,000 manuscript scores, 23,600 gramophone records, 5,700 cassettes, and 7,447 CDs.

=== Reading rooms collections ===
- Reference Collection
- LIS Collection
- Doctoral and Master’s Theses Collection
- Homeland War Book Collection
- Official Publications Collection
- Foreign Croatica Collection (Croatian version only)

== Historical overview ==
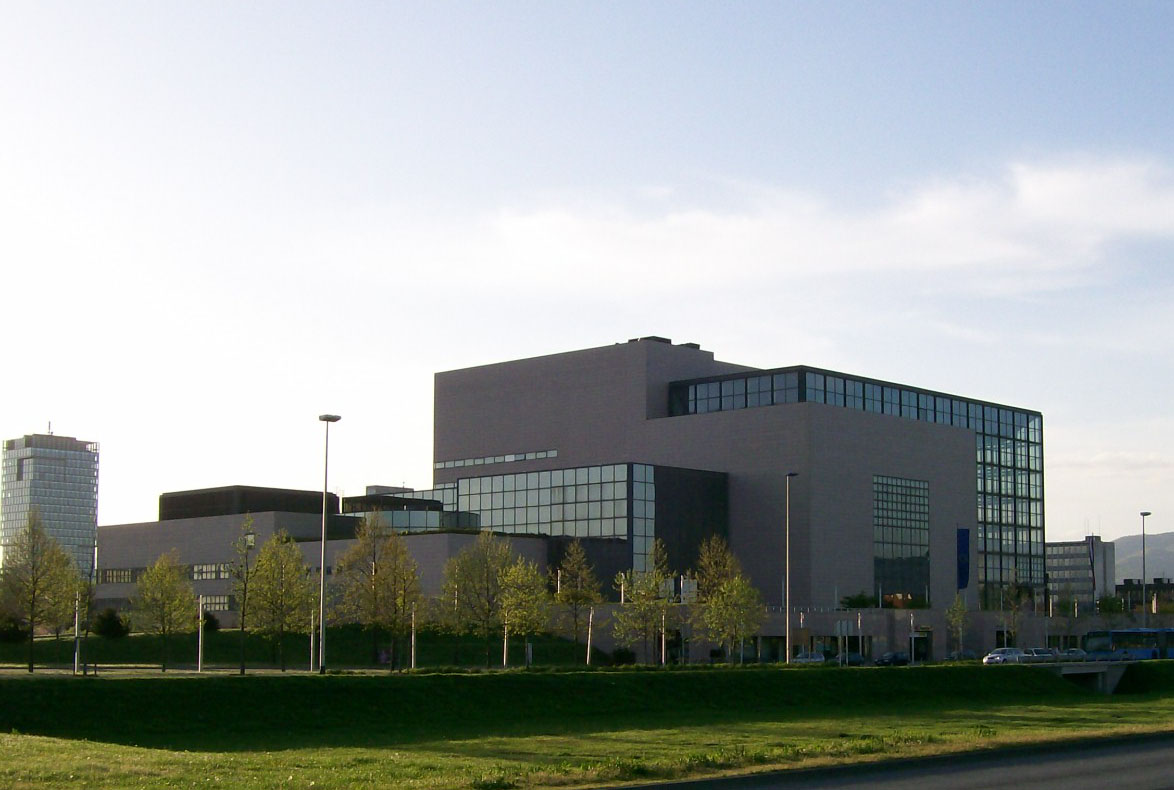
Library in 2008

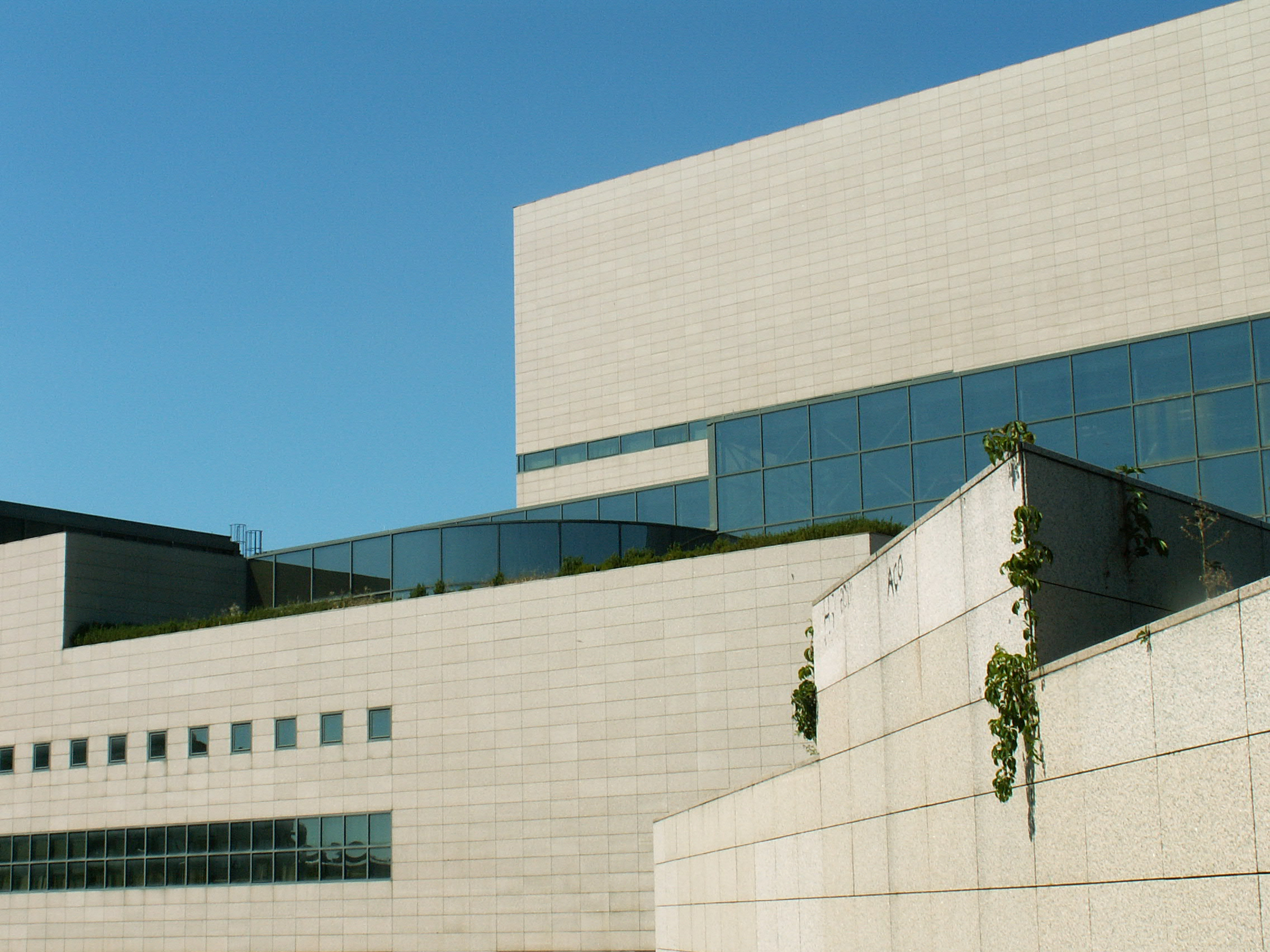
Brutalist architecture facade

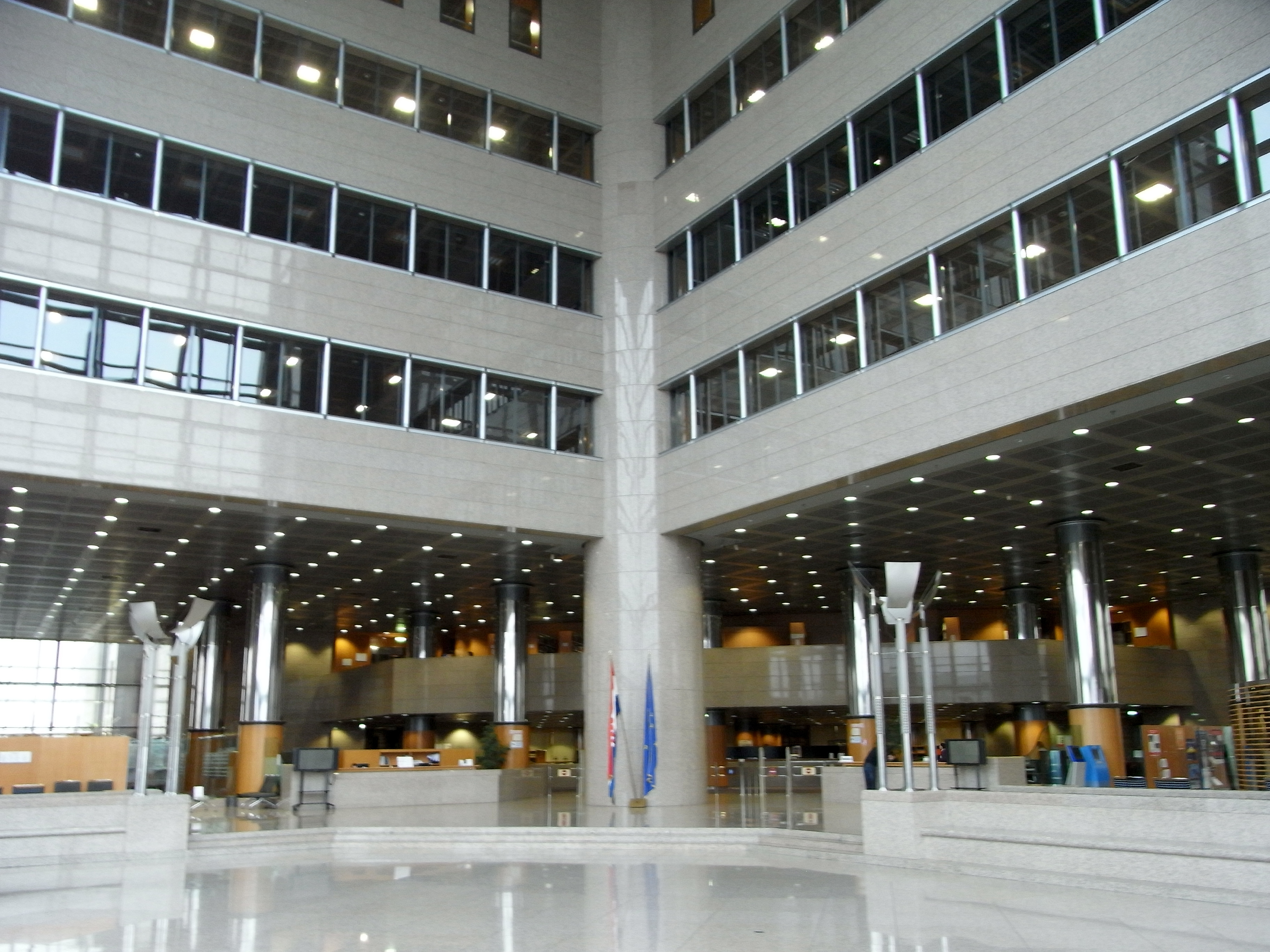
Main lobby of the library

In 1607 the Jesuit order established itself in Zagreb. In addition to founding a grammar school, the Jesuits founded a Jesuit College with an accompanying library. By 1645 the library was housed in a special hall, it had a librarian and rules were established regarding the preservation and lending of books. In 1669 the Jesuit College acquired the status of an academy by the Charter of King Leopold I and became Academia Zagrabiensis. The library and its holdings were moved into an old building of the abandoned Dominican monastery in today's 5 St. Catherine's Square in the Old Town of Zagreb.

The Jesuit order was disbanded in 1773. The college continued with its provisional activities until 1776, when the library became part of the Royal Zagreb Academy of Sciences (Regia Academia Zagrabiensis) as an academy of law, philosophy and theology. The following year the library received a bequest containing historical material from the clergyman Adam Baltazar Krčelić, with a stipulation that this material be made available to the wider public.

As a result of legal deposit regulations introduced in 1816 bearing on the University of Pest, the library's national importance began to increase. Such legal deposit regulations were extended to the whole territory of Croatia and Slavonia in 1837. Antun Kukuljević, politician and the founder of the Croatian educational system, changed the name of the library to the Latin name, Nationalis Academica Bibliotheca, highlighting the dual nature of the library's educational and national functions, which it has jointly developed since then and symbolically preserved in its name to this day.

The Franz Josef I Royal University in Zagreb was founded in 1874, and the Academy library (Bibliotheca Regiae Academiae Zagrabiensis) became part of the university and changed its name to University Library, increasing its significance and role in higher education. In 1892 the Library was enlarged for the famous Bibliotheca Zriniana, the private library of the Croatian Ban Nikola Zrinski, originally established in Čakovec, but which had been abroad for a long time.

In 1913 the library with its approximately 110,000 volumes moved from the building of the present-day Rector's Office into an impressive Art Nouveau edifice located in 21 Marko Marulić Square, the first building built specifically for the purposes of the library. As it was designed to house 500,000 volumes, its premises soon become inadequate for the library's 2,500,000 volumes – books, journals, newspapers and the particularly valuable items of the library's special collections. A new library building, the Pantheon of the Croatian Book, was commissioned: its foundation stone was laid in 1988 and the building opened on 28 May 1995 as part of the celebration of the fifth anniversary of Croatia's independence. This modern edifice was designed by Croatian architects Velimir Neidhardt, Marijan Hržić, Zvonimir Krznarić and Davor Mance.

Library was one of the main venues of the 2020 Croatian Presidency of the Council of the European Union. For that purpose, 95 million HRK was invested into the preparation of nine conference halls, press center, translators' cabins, videowalls and infirmary; Library was the first building in Croatia fully equipped with 5G network.

On March 19, 2020 Government of Croatia temporarily moved its assemblies from Banski dvori to the Library, just three days before earthquake in Zagreb. Due to restoration of the Dvori, as well as COVID-19, assemblies were kept being held in the Library during 2020.
