= D23 road (Croatia) =

Road in Croatia

D23 state road

Route information
- Length: 103.9 km (64.6 mi)

Major junctions
- From: D3 in Duga Resa
- D42 in Josipdol A1 in Brinje interchange A1 in Žuta Lokva interchange D50 near Žuta Lokva
- To: D8 in Senj

Location
- Country: Croatia
- Counties: Karlovac, Lika-Senj
- Major cities: Duga Resa, Josipdol, Senj

Highway system
- Highways in Croatia

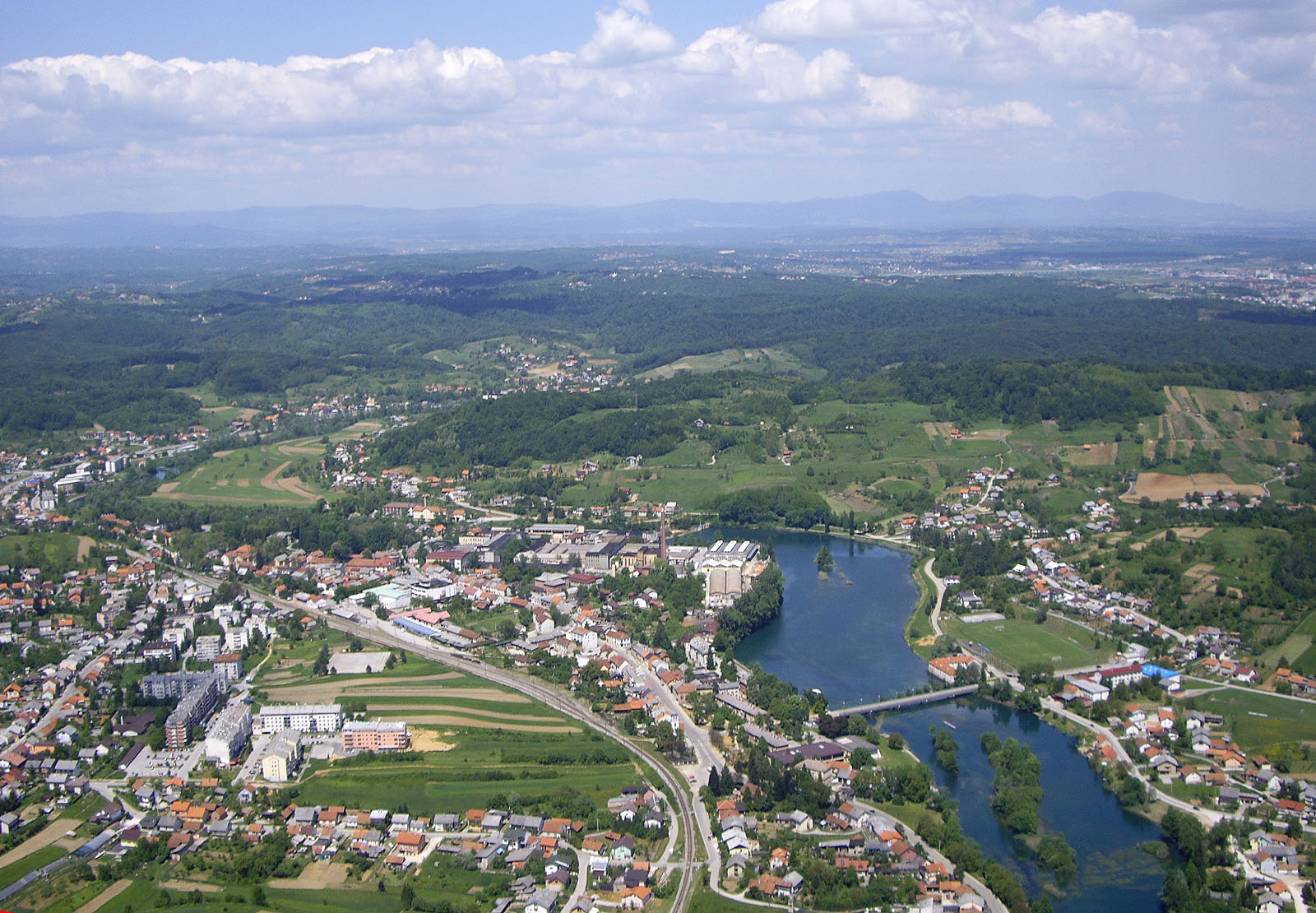
Duga Resa, at the northern terminus of D23

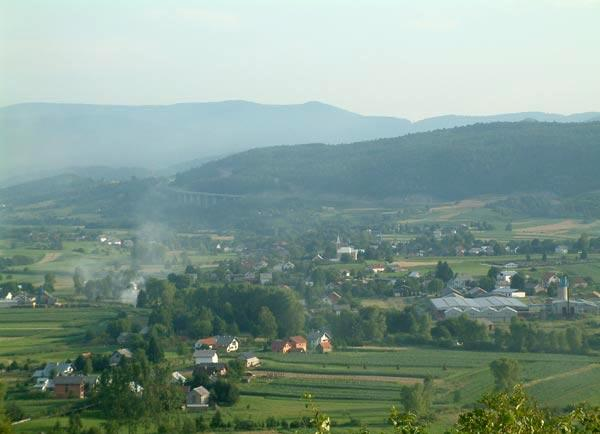
Josipdol, on the D23 route

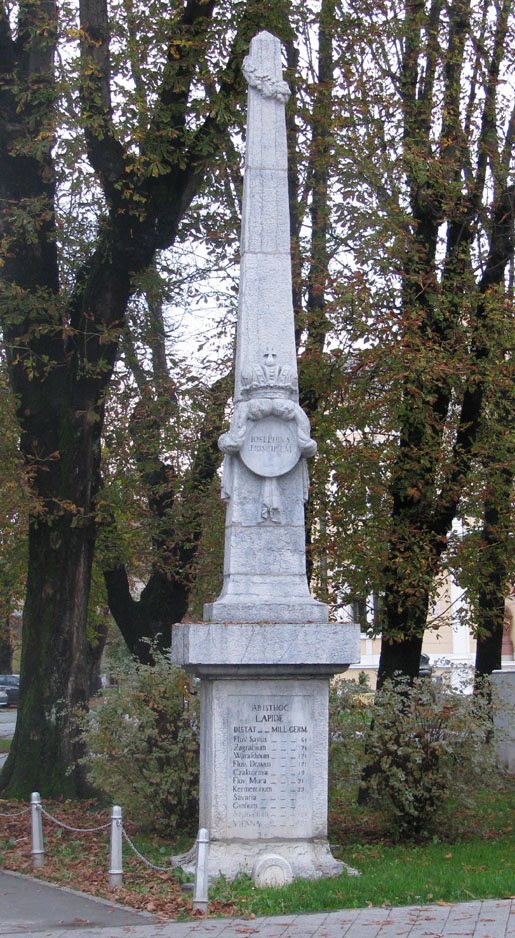
Via Josephina starting obelisk in Karlovac

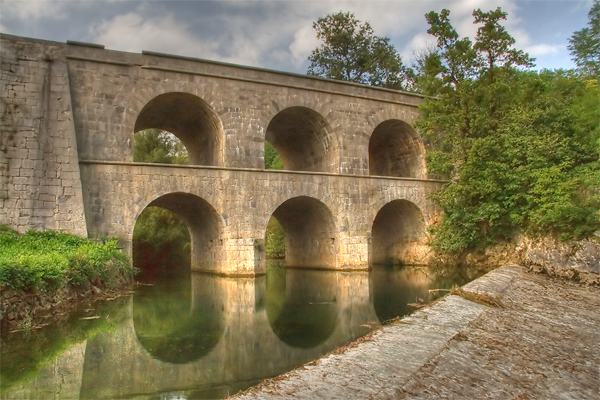
Tounj bridge

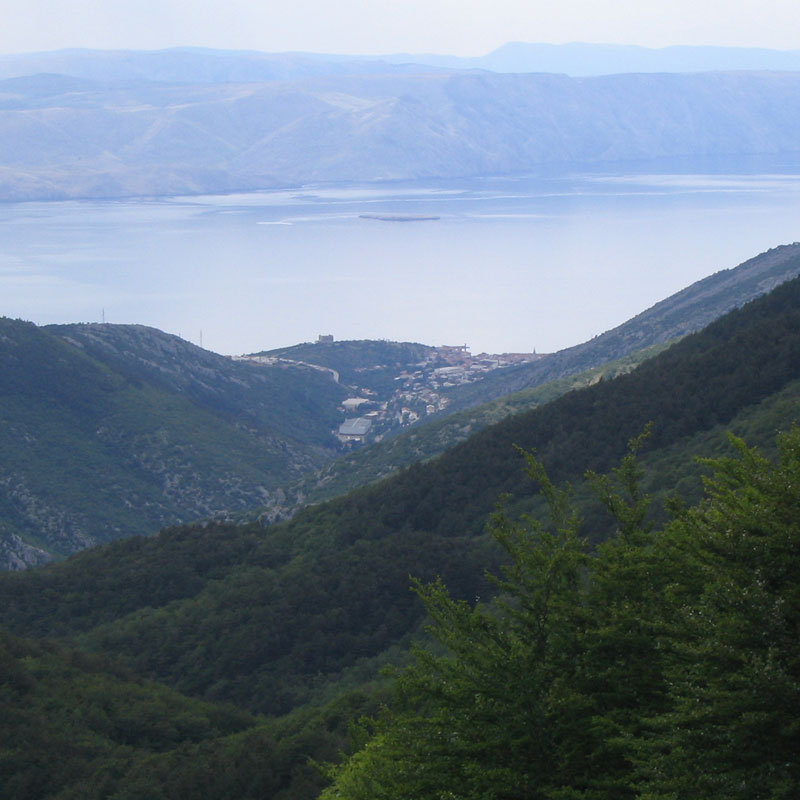
Panorama of Senj from Vratnik Pass and the D23 road

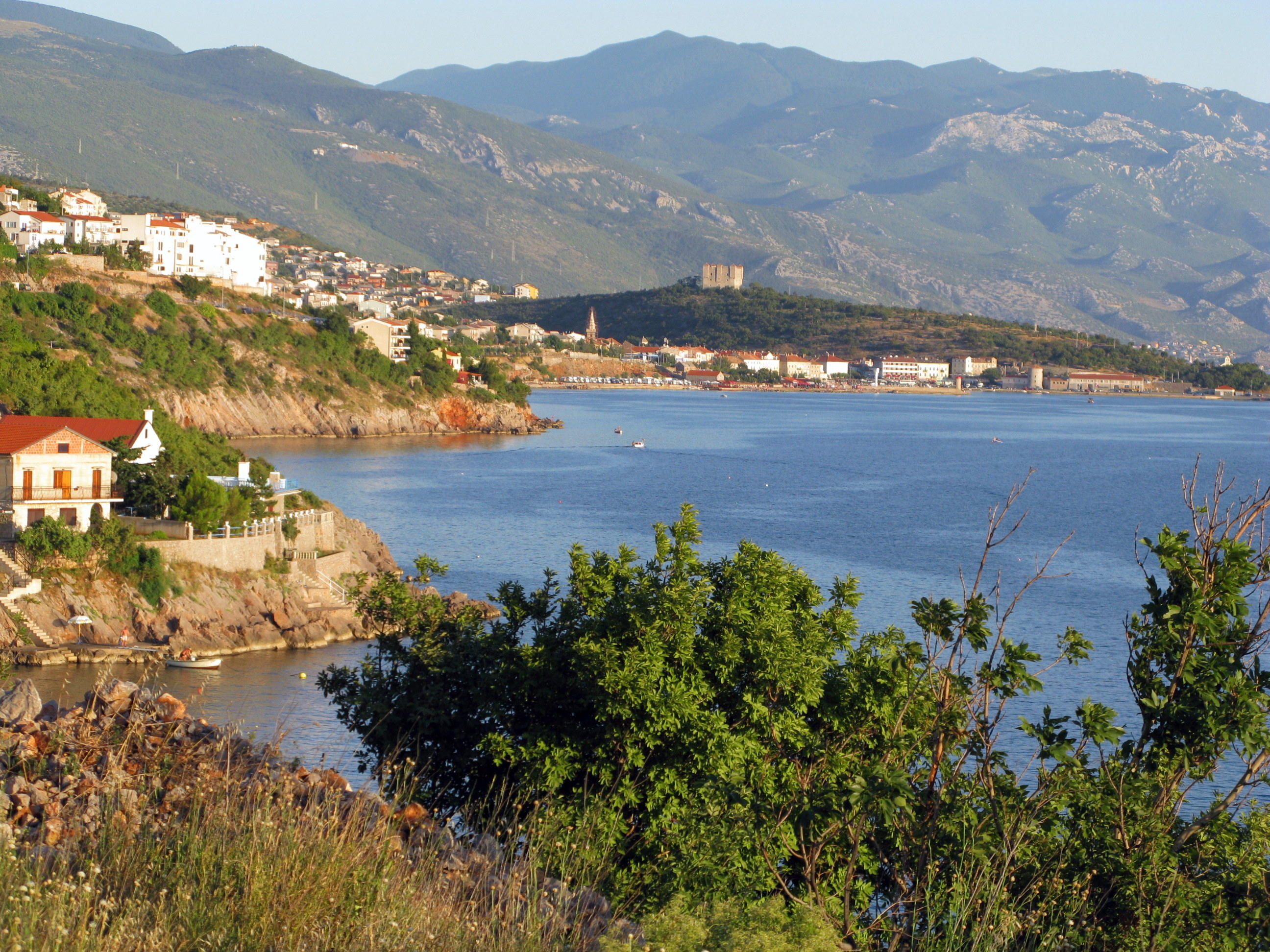
Senj, at the southern terminus of D23

D23 state road, connects cities and towns of Duga Resa, Josipdol and Senj, to the state road network of Croatia, and most notably to A1 motorway in Žuta Lokva interchange, as well as two major state roads - D3 and D8, located at the northern terminus and the southern terminus of the road respectively. The road is 103.9 km (64.6 mi) long. The route comprises a significant number of urban intersections, in segments of the road running through Duga Resa and Senj.

The D23 state road runs parallel to a section of the A1 motorway between Karlovac and Žuta Lokva interchanges, thus serving as an alternate or backup route for the motorway. Additionally, A7 motorway route is planned along the D23 road between Senj and Žuta Lokva. Once that motorway is completed, the D23 road shall run parallel to either A1 or A7 motorway along its entire length.

The road, as well as all other state roads in Croatia, is managed and maintained by Hrvatske ceste, a state-owned company.

== History ==
Vratnik pass, currently a part of the D23 road, was already in use during Roman time as a salt road, and it became important for timber and other goods in the Middle Ages. However, the first well documented road built along the route was Via Josephina named after Joseph II, Holy Roman Emperor who commissioned its construction in 1775. Latin inscriptions carved in rock along the original Via Josephina route completed in 1779 testify that the Emperor travelled through the Vratnik pass on horseback when he realized that the route between Senj, as a major fortress on Adriatic coast, and the hinterland was nearly impassable. Legend has it that this happened when he fell from his horse near Vratnik Pass. Even though the incident is impossible to verify, the town of Josipdol to the east of the mountain pass is named after the Holy Roman Emperor.

In 1775, Joseph II indeed commissioned construction of the route, exactly 100 km (62 mi) long, from Vinko Struppi, a military engineer, and the road, named after the Emperor, was completed in 1779. The original route comprised very steep sections and 20% inclines were not uncommon. There was even one climb at a 30% grade. Because of this the road was modified and extended by 15 km (9.3 mi), in order to remove such steep sections. The first reconstruction was carried out as early as late 18th century, and another one between 1833 and 1845 managed by Field Marshal Josef Philipp Vukassovich (Croatian: Josip Filip Vukasović) and Josip Kajetan Knežić respectively. Subsequent modifications were not as significant. The road was paved in 1950, when the last minor modifications of the route were executed.

The route was distinguished by mile markers along the route, an obelisk in Karlovac marking the beginning of the road and a specially built gate in Senj marking its end. Most remarkably the original road included a stone bridge across three spans in Tounj, which was expanded during the reconstruction of 1845 and now has two levels. The upper level was destroyed during World War II, but it was rebuilt in the 1950s.

== Traffic volume ==
Traffic is regularly counted and reported by Hrvatske ceste, operator of the road. Substantial variations between annual (AADT) and summer (ASDT) traffic volumes are attributed to the fact that the road serves as a connection to A1 motorway and D8 state road carrying substantial tourist traffic.

D23 traffic volume
| Road | Counting site | AADT | ASDT | Notes |
| D23 | 3008 Belavići | 2,749 | 3,441 | Adjacent to the Ž3176 junction. |
| D23 | 3013 Skradnik | 1,782 | 2,209 | Between the Ž2356 and Ž3255 junctions. |
| D23 | 3014 Munjava (Josipdol) | 1,127 | 1,485 | Adjacent to D42 junction. |
| D23 | 3028 Modruš | 379 | 599 | Adjacent to L34136 junction. |
| D23 | 4201 Brinje | 912 | 1,299 | Adjacent to Ž5110 junction. |
| D23 | 4101 Senj | 3,417 | 7,555 | Adjacent to D8 junction. |

== Road junctions and populated areas ==
D23 major junctions/populated areas
| Type | Slip roads/Notes |
| | Duga Resa; D3 to Delnice (to the west) and Karlovac (to the east). Ž3182 to Belavići. The northern terminus of the road. |
| | Venac Mrežnički |
| | Donji Zvečaj |
| | Zvečaj; Ž3183 to Gornje Bukovlje and Belavići |
| | Gornji Zvečaj |
| | Generalski Stol; Ž3176 to Lešće and Orišje. Ž3185 to Perjasica and Barilović. |
| | Donje Dubrave |
| | Zdenac; Ž3220 to Tounj. Ž3221 to Rebrovići. |
| | Ž3256 to Kamenica Skradnička, Gornje Primišlje and Slunj (D1). |
| | Skradnik; Ž3255 to Oštarije (D42). |
| | Josipdol; D42 to Ogulin (to the north). D23 and D42 are concurrent between Josipdol and Munjava for approximately 1.5 km (0.93 mi). |
| | Munjava; D42 to Plaški (to the south). D23 and D42 are concurrent between Josipdol and Munjava for approximately 1.5 km (0.93 mi). |
| | Modruš |
| | Jezerane; Ž5191 to Mrkopalj and Lokve (D3). |
| | Križpolje; Ž5111 to Križ Kamenica. Ž5133 to Glibodol and Lička Jasenica (D42). |
| | A1 in Brinje interchange, to Zagreb (to the north) and to Zadar and Split (to the south). |
| | Brinje; Ž5114 to Letinac. |
| | Prokike; Ž5110 to Krivi Put and Klenovica (D8). |
| | A1 in Žuta Lokva interchange, to Zagreb (to the north) and to Zadar and Split (to the south). |
| | D50 to Gospić |
| | Melnice |
| | Vratnik |
| | Senj; D8 to Rijeka (to the north) and Karlobag (to the south). The southern terminus of the road. |

== See also ==
- Highways in Croatia
- Autocesta Rijeka - Zagreb
- Hrvatske autoceste
