= D42 road (Croatia) =

Road in Croatia

D42 state road

Route information
- Length: 90.3 km (56.1 mi)

Major junctions
- From: D3 in Vrbovsko
- A6 in Vrbovsko interchange A1 in Ogulin interchange D23 in Josipdol and Munjava
- To: D1 in Grabovac

Location
- Country: Croatia
- Counties: Primorje-Gorski Kotar, Karlovac, Lika-Senj
- Major cities: Ogulin, Josipdol, Plaški, Saborsko

Highway system
- Highways in Croatia

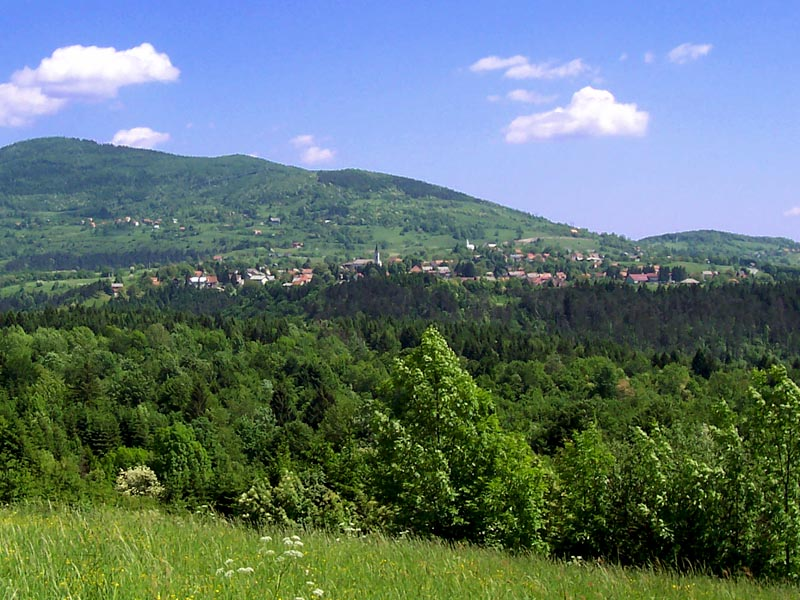
Vrbovsko, at the northern terminus of the D42 road

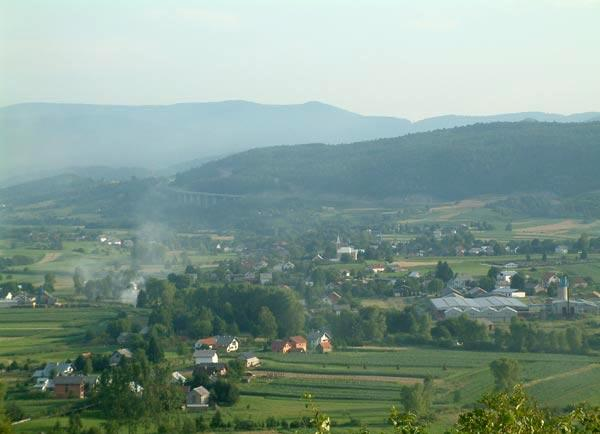
Josipdol, on the D42 route

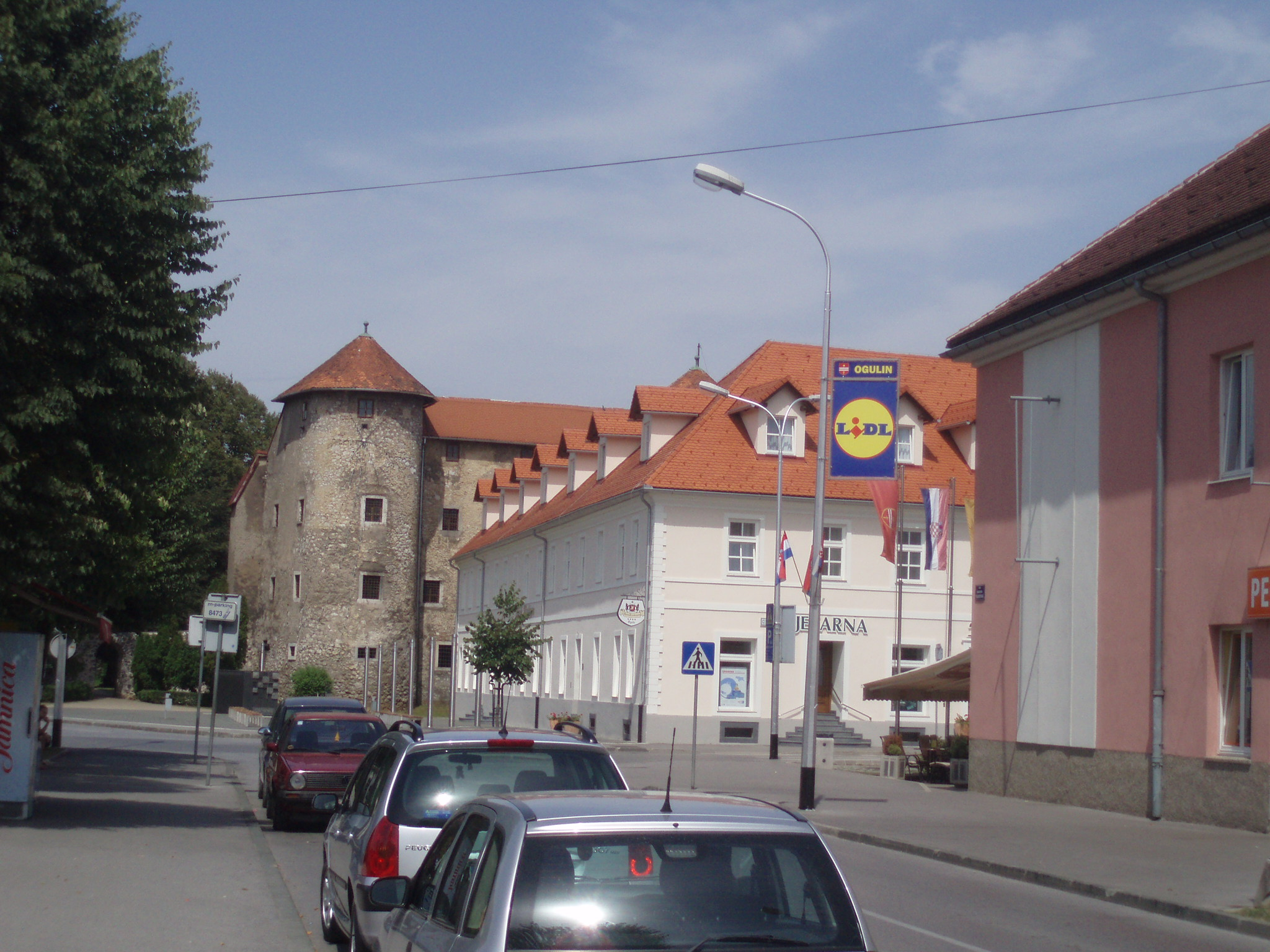
Ogulin, on the D42 route

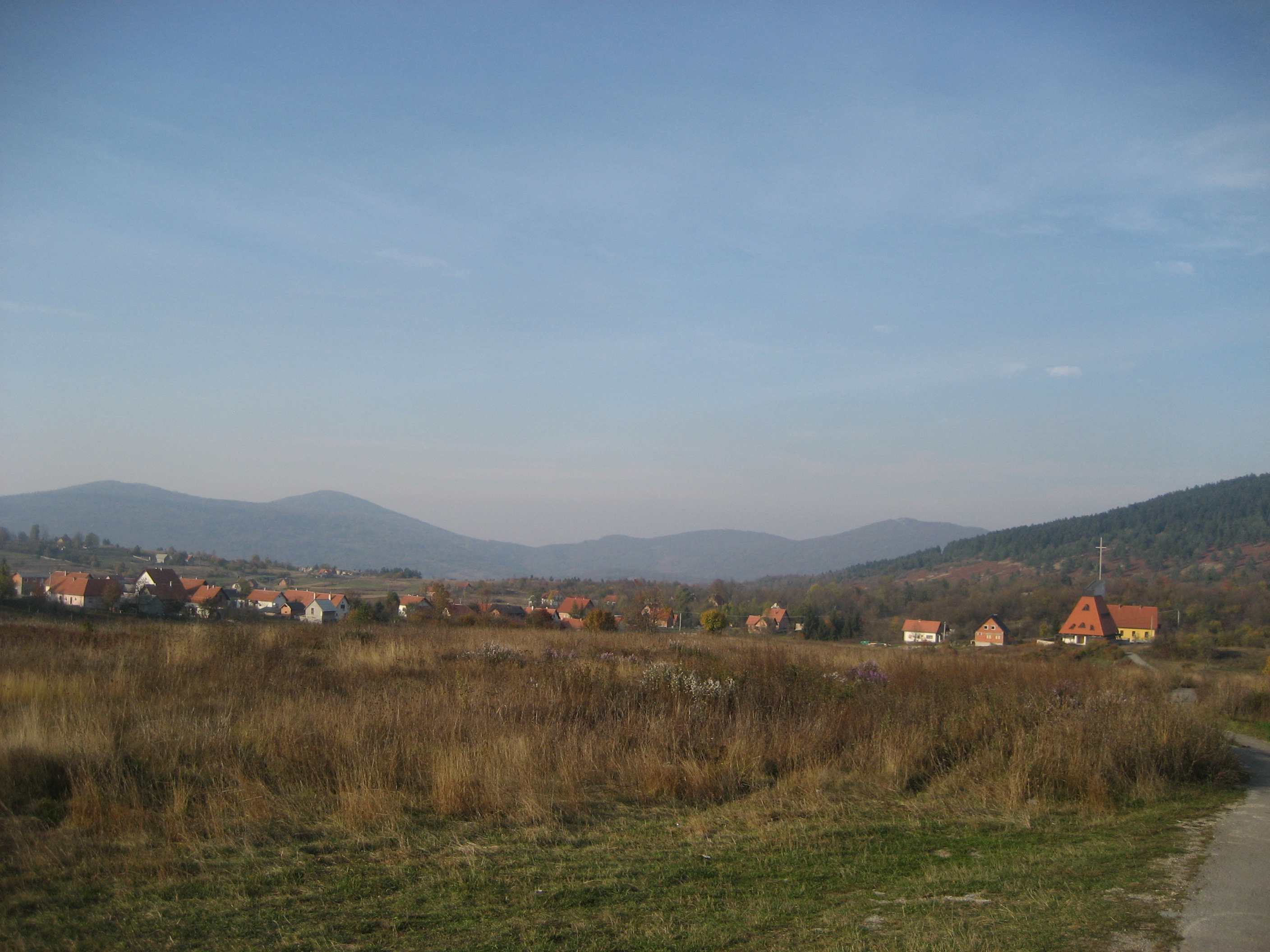
Saborsko, on the D42 route

D42 state road, connecting Gorski Kotar and Lika regions of Croatia, and cities and towns of Vrbovsko, Josipdol and Ogulin, to the state road network of Croatia, and most notably to A6 and A1 Vrbovsko and Ogulin interchanges respectively. The road is 90.3 km (56.1 mi) long. The route comprises a significant number of urban intersections, in segment of the road running through Ogulin.

The road, as well as all other state roads in Croatia, is managed and maintained by Hrvatske ceste, a state-owned company.

== Traffic volume ==
Traffic is regularly counted and reported by Hrvatske ceste, operator of the road.

D42 traffic volume
Road	Counting site	AADT	ASDT	Notes
D42	3010 Sveti Petar	1,210	1,1434	Adjacent to Ž3254 junction.
D42	4306 Saborsko - east	556	998	Adjacent to Ž5201 junction.

== Road junctions and populated areas ==
D42 major junctions/populated areas
Type	Slip roads/Notes
	Vrbovsko; D3 to Delnice and Skrad (to the west) and to Zdihovo and Bosanci (to the east). The northern terminus of the road. Ž5034 to Ravna Gora and Kupjak.
	A6 in Vrbovsko interchange, to Rijeka (to the west) and to Zagreb and Karlovac (to the east).
	Gomirje
	Ljubošina
	Hreljin Ogulinski
	Ž3254 to Puškarići and Jasenak.
	Ogulin; Ž3175 to Orišje and Resnik Bosiljevski and Vukova Gorica. Ž3218 to Gornje Zagorje.
	Otok Oštarijski
	A1 in Ogulin interchange, to Zadar and Split (to the south) and to Zagreb and Karlovac (to the north).
	Oštarije; Ž3255 to Skradnik.
	Josipdol; D23 to Duga Resa (to the north). D23 and D42 are concurrent between Josipdol and Munjava for approximately 1.5 km (0.93 mi).
	Munjava; D23 to Žuta Lokva and Senj (to the south). D23 and D42 are concurrent between Josipdol and Munjava for approximately 1.5 km (0.93 mi).
	Vajin Vrh
	Istočni Trojvrh
	Pothum Plaščanski
	Plaški
	Lapat
	Begovac
	Lička Jasenica; Ž5113 to Glibodol and Križpolje.
	Saborsko
	Poljanak
	Selište Drežničko; Ž5201 to Plitvice Lakes National Park and Prijeboj.
	Grabovac; D1 to Slunj and Karlovac (to the north) and to Knin and Sinj (to the south). The southern terminus of the road.
