= Josipdol =

- Municipality
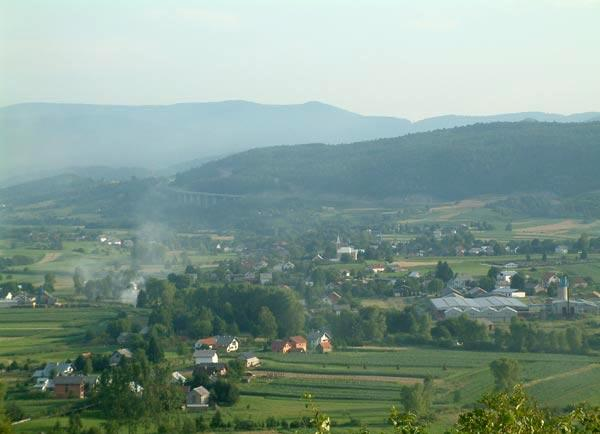

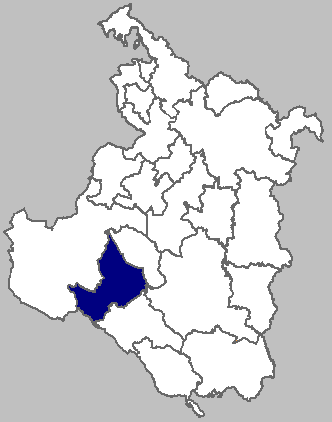
- The Josipdol municipality within Karlovac County

- Location in Croatia
- Coordinates: 45.188624°N 15.284755°E
- Country: Croatia
- County: Karlovac County

Government
  - Mayor: Dragan Rudančić

Area
  - Municipality: 167.2 km^{2} (64.6 sq mi)
  - Urban: 10.1 km^{2} (3.9 sq mi)

Population (2021)
  - Municipality: 3,419
  - Density: 20.45/km^{2} (52.96/sq mi)
  - Urban: 1,015
  - Urban density: 100/km^{2} (260/sq mi)
- Time zone: UTC+1 (CET)
- Website: josipdol.hr

Josipdol is a village and municipality in Karlovac County, Croatia. It is part of Lika region.

== Geography ==
Josipdol is situated in the Ogulin-Plaški valley which together with Lika and Gorski Kotar forms Mountainous Croatia. The town is located at the crossroads of state roads D-23, which connects Karlovac and Senj (Jozefin road), and D-42, which connects Vrbovsko and Plitvice. Josipdol is located 10 km southeast from Ogulin, 14 km northwest from Plaški and 45 km southwest from Karlovac.

== Demographics ==
In 1895, the obćina of Josipdol (court at Josipdol), with an area of 92 square kilometres (36 mi^{2}), belonged to the kotar of Ogulin (Ogulin court but electoral district of Plaški) in the županija of Modruš-Rieka (Ogulin high court and financial board). There were 762 houses, with a population of 4633. Its 14 villages and 20 hamlets were divided for taxation purposes into 6 porezne obćine, under the Ogulin office.

According to the 2011 census, the town had a population of 879 with a total municipality population of 3,773, of which 90% were Croats and 9% were Serbs. Serbs form the majority in the village of Trojvrh.

== History ==
Scarce archaeological remains near Oštarije village show that the area was settled in the Neolithic. Remains from the Copper Age show that the area was the southernmost part of Lasinja culture. The first known inhabitants of the area were the Illyrian tribe of Japods, which lived here from the late Bronze Age. In this area the Japods had two strongholds, Tetrapones, east of today's town Josipdol and Metulum, north of the town. On the north the Japods bordered with Celts and random remains of Celtic coins were found in the area.

In the period 35-33 B.C. future Roman Emperor Octavian conquered the Japod areas and incorporated them into the Roman Empire. Although no physical remains of any Roman road has been found it is believed that through this area passed the Yantar road, which connected the Baltic with the Adriatic. During this period Metulum had municipality status which is proved by a script from Diocletian's time.

In the 7th century Slavs came to colonize the Balkan area and founded a settlement Modruš in the Josipdol area. In the 9th century, Modruš is mentioned as the site of the Borna and Ljudevit Posavski confrontation. In 1102 Croatia joined personal union with Hungary and the Hungarians formed new territorial units called Župas; Modruš became the seat of one of these Župas and soon became the seat of the Krbava-Modruš episcopacy.

In the 12th century, Modruš became a possession of the Frankopan family. Because it was on a road that connected the interior with the coast, Modruš became an important traffic and trade center. This was the golden age for Modruš, which lasted until wars with the Ottomans in the 15th century, when it was raided several times.

As Croatia became part of the Habsburg empire Modruš became part of the Military Frontier and a new population settled the area. In 1775, emperor Joseph II visited Josipdol. In 1776, Austrian authorities began to build the road that would connect Karlovac with Senj and Josipdol was founded as a traffic and trade center on the road. The road was named Josephina and it is still in use today.

During the Kingdom of Yugoslavia, a railway from Ogulin to Split was built which passed Josipdol. The railway accelerated the industrial growth of the town and a wood industry was founded.

In May 1941, the Ustaša government began targeting known and suspected JRZ members with arrests. The prominent JRZ members in Josipdol at the time were Nikica Orlić, Đuro Boca and Milutin Kosanović.

On 22 May 1941, the Ustaše arrested 6 youths in Josipdol, accusing them of propagating Communism.

A 2 July was issued order for all Velike župe, including that of Modruš (with seat in Ogulin), to make room for 2500 Slovenes each, who were to occupy the homes of 2500 Serbs, to be deported to the GMS, prioritising businessmen and merchants. Josipdol, which had the possibility of housing 2000 souls in its empty military barracks, was to accommodate 198 Slovenes. As of mid-July, there were not enough empty Serb homes to accommodate the exchange.

Around July 8, the Ogulin kotar began the process of deporting the families to the Sisak concentration camp on a list of 55 people marked for moving to make room for Slovene arrivals, from Jasenak, Josipdol, Munjava, Trojvrh and Vajin Vrh. The deportations were never carried out thanks to Pavelić interrupting the process, but thanks to the mass arrests scaring the Serbs off, none of the attempted arrests in this area succeeded, since none of the named could be found at their house. So great was the fear that women would flee at the sound of a suspicious car. (Note: "Zbog učestalih zločina žene budno paze na svaki auto i čim opaze nekakav dolazak sumnjivog automobila, odmah bježe.") So the kotarski predstojnik of Ogulin proposed to wait 8 to 10 days until the atmosphere was calmer.

On 30 July, many Serb villagers of Josipdol were arrested at the market in Ogulin, having come there to sell. Beginning with the next market on 6 August, the Serbs stopped coming out of fear that it would happen a third time.

On 5–6 August, the Ustaše of Josipdol placed all the Serbs of Josipdol and its environs under house arrest. The Serbs mostly obeyed, so the arrests the Ustaše made on 6–7 August were mostly successful. On the 6th the arrests were made between 21:00 and 23:00 in Josipdol, Vajin Vrh and Vojnovac. According to witness Branko Sedlar, most of the arrestees were killed in Podveljun near Josipdol. On the 7th, the day the same Ustaše massacred 45 people in Trojvrh, they arrested 41 more in Josipdol, Vajin Vrh and Vojnovac. They intended to kill the new arrestees, but the Italians intervened and they were released. An Ustaša functionary arrived in Josipdol, who released all arrestees and ordered the killing to stop. On the 12th, the mourning Serb women demonstrated in Josipdol, requesting of the Italians to hold a trial for the murderers. While this did not take place, the Croat men fled to Hum, remaining there throughout August.

The Croatian War of Independence (1991–1995) affected the south-eastern part of the municipality, which led to depopulation of the area.

In the 21st century it was one of the centers where the Zagreb-Split motorway was built and many locals found jobs in constructing it. In 2003 the first part of the road was opened on the Bosiljevo-Josipdol part.

== Economy ==
Economy is mostly based on agriculture, harvesting potatoes, mushrooms and fruit. There also couple of smaller sawmills. In 2003 municipality experienced economic boom because of building motorway Zagreb-Split nearby. Josipdol was one of the construction centers and many locals found job in construction of motorway.

== Demographics ==
Municipality of Josipdol: Population trends 1857–2021
v

population	8035	7906	7826	8454	8267	7853	7461	7682	6985	7117	6631	5823	5172	4850	3987	3773	3419
	1857	1869	1880	1890	1900	1910	1921	1931	1948	1953	1961	1971	1981	1991	2001	2011	2021

Note:Originated from the old općina Ogulin. Sources: Croatian Bureau of Statistics publications
Village of Josipdol: Population trends 1857–2021
v

population	554	546	694	691	669	614	719	762	675	832	858	881	993	1116	993	879	1015
	1857	1869	1880	1890	1900	1910	1921	1931	1948	1953	1961	1971	1981	1991	2001	2011	2021

Sources: Croatian Bureau of Statistics publications

== Towns and villages in municipality ==
- Carevo Polje
- Cerovnik
- Istočni Trojvrh
- Modruš
- Munjava
- Munjava Modruška
- Oštarije
- Sabljaki Modruški
- Salopeki Modruški
- Skradnik
- Trojvrh
- Vajin Vrh
- Vojnovac

== Governance ==
On 1 January 1894, Vajin Vrh and Trojvrh, until then part of Plaški obćina, were annexed by Josipdol obćina.

== Infrastructure ==
In 1913, there were 8 gendarmeries in Delnice kotar: Ogulin, Drežnica, Generalski Stol, Jasenak, Saborsko, Josipdol, Modruš and Plaški.
