= Ogulin-Plaški valley =

Valley in Croatia

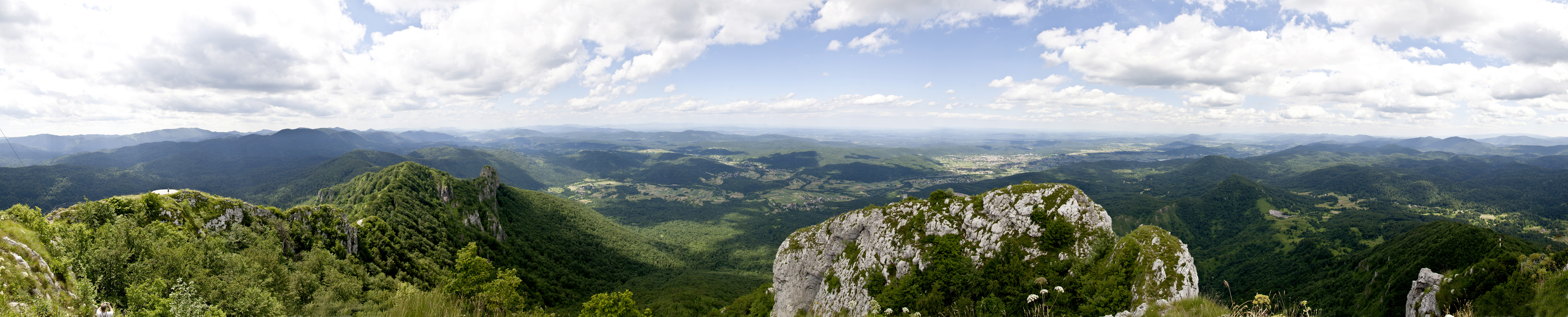
- View from Klek

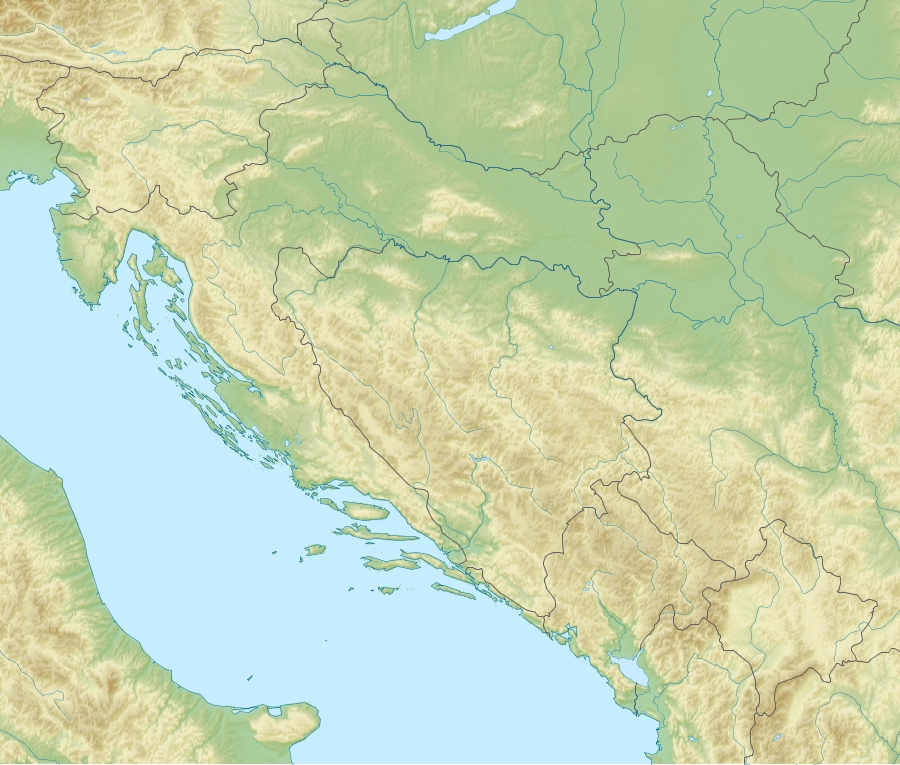
- Location within Croatia Location within Dinaric Alps

Geography
- Coordinates: 45.2°N 15.3°E

Location
- Interactive map of Ogulin-Plaški valley

Ogulin-Plaški valley (Croatian: Ogulinsko-plaščanska udolina) is a valley in the mountainous part of central Croatia, named after the towns of Ogulin and Plaški. It is located at an elevation of 300 to 380 meters above sea level, surrounded by the Dinaric Alps, namely the mountains of Velika Kapela, Mala Kapela, Krpelj, Radošić, Brezovica, Hum, and Pištenik. Its total area is around 1,100 square kilometres (420 mi^{2}).

The two namesakes of the valley also include karst fields or polje, those of Ogulin (Ogulinsko polje, 63 km^{2} (24 sq mi)) and of Plaški (Plaščansko polje, 22 km^{2} (8.5 sq mi)).

The A1 motorway intersects the valley near Oštarije. The D42 road and the M604 railway pass through it longitudinally.
