= Jasenak, Croatia =

Settlement in Karlovac County, Croatia

Jasenak
- Settlement
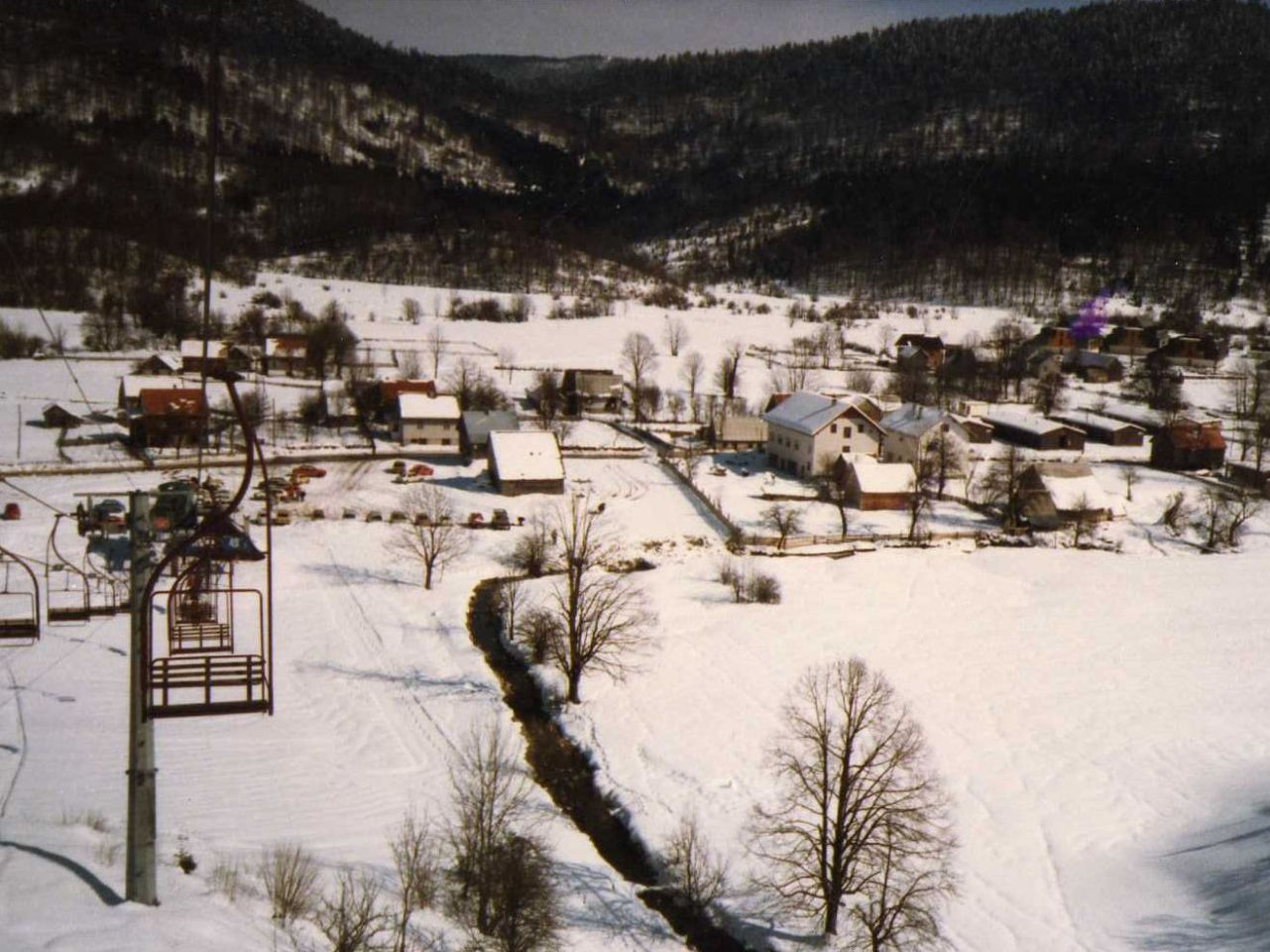
- View of resort from Vrelo
- Interactive map of Jasenak
- Location of Jasenak in Croatia
- Coordinates: 45°13′52″N 15°02′31″E
- Country: Croatia
- County: Karlovac County
- City: Ogulin

Area
  - Total: 86.9 km^{2} (33.6 sq mi)

Population (2021)
  - Total: 175
  - Density: 2.01/km^{2} (5.22/sq mi)
- Time zone: UTC+1 (CET)
  - Summer (DST): UTC+2 (CEST)
- Postal code: 47300 Ogulin
- Area code: +385 (0)47

Jasenak is a village in Karlovac County, Croatia. It is located in the municipality of Ogulin, on the Jasenačko polje, a karst polje. In 2021, its population was 175. It is the site of the former Bjelolasica Olympic Centre. The village is known for its proximity to Bjelolasica mountain.

== History ==
In the 1930s, Simo Kosanović of Jasenak was the caretaker of Hirčeva kuća in Bijele stijene.

=== WWII ===
==== 1941 ====
When Ante Pavelić arrived in Delnice on 13 April 1941, he was awaited by a small group of Frankists. They asked Pavelić for assistance against some Royal Yugoslav Army soldiers who were in the hills nearby, and received from Pavelić a number of Ustaše in response. More concretely, a large group of Yugoslav soldiers had been retreating from the Italian border through Jelenje, Lokve, Mrkopalj and Jasenak. Upon entering Mrkopalj, they were met by a Croat force belonging to Mačekova zaštita, but the Yugoslav soldiers refused to disarm.

At the beginning of June, the Ustaše arrested about ten villagers, to whom they read the names of some prominent individuals in and around Jasenak, requesting that they come to Ogulin. They then let all villagers go, so when the villagers who were let go relayed their message to those named on the list, the named complied. From Ogulin they were taken to Gospić, then to the Jadovno concentration camp where they were killed.

In late June or early July 1941, the priest in Jasenak was arrested. In early July, he had not yet been sent away. As of a 15 July document, all he had been sent to a concentration camp.

Around July 8, the Ogulin kotar began the process of deporting the families to the Sisak concentration camp on a list of 55 people marked for moving to make room for Slovene arrivals, from Jasenak, Josipdol, Munjava, Trojvrh and Vajin Vrh. The deportations were never carried out thanks to Pavelić interrupting the process, but thanks to the mass arrests scaring the Serbs off, none of the attempted arrests in this area succeeded, since none of the named could be found at their house. So great was the fear that women would flee at the sound of a suspicious car. (Note: "Zbog učestalih zločina žene budno paze na svaki auto i čim opaze nekakav dolazak sumnjivog automobila, odmah bježe.") So the kotarski predstojnik of Ogulin proposed to wait 8 to 10 days until the atmosphere was calmer.

==== 1942 ====
At 10:00 on 24 February 1942, a group of about 300 "Communists" with automatic weapons arrived in the area of Ogulin nd above Hreljin and Kučaj. Until 14:00, they blocked the road to Ogulin, after which they retreated to Gomirje. For 3–4 days they appeared from time to time in the area of Ogulin, Hreljin, Vrbovsko and Gomirje, then Gornje Dubrave, Gomirje and Jasenak.

== Demographics ==
Village of Jasenak: Population trends 1857–2021
v

population	383	542	741	955	1028	1130	1022	1124	592	643	590	453	382	331	301	226	175
	1857	1869	1880	1890	1900	1910	1921	1931	1948	1953	1961	1971	1981	1991	2001	2011	2021

Sources: Croatian Bureau of Statistics publications

In 1835, Jasenak belonged to Ogulin. There were 18 houses, with a population of 244. Its residents were Eastern Orthodox. It had a Gemeinde-Fruchtmagazine.

== Climate ==
A weather station exists there at an elevation of 618 metres (2,028 ft). The minimum recorded temperature for the winter of 2024–2025 was −16.7 °C (1.9 °F), on February 20.

== Infrastructure ==
=== Forestry ===
The forestry offices of Ogulin srez were in Ogulin, Drežnica and Jasenak.

=== Security ===
In 1913, there were 8 gendarmeries in Delnice kotar: Ogulin, Drežnica, Generalski Stol, Jasenak, Saborsko, Josipdol, Modruš and Plaški.

== Gallery ==
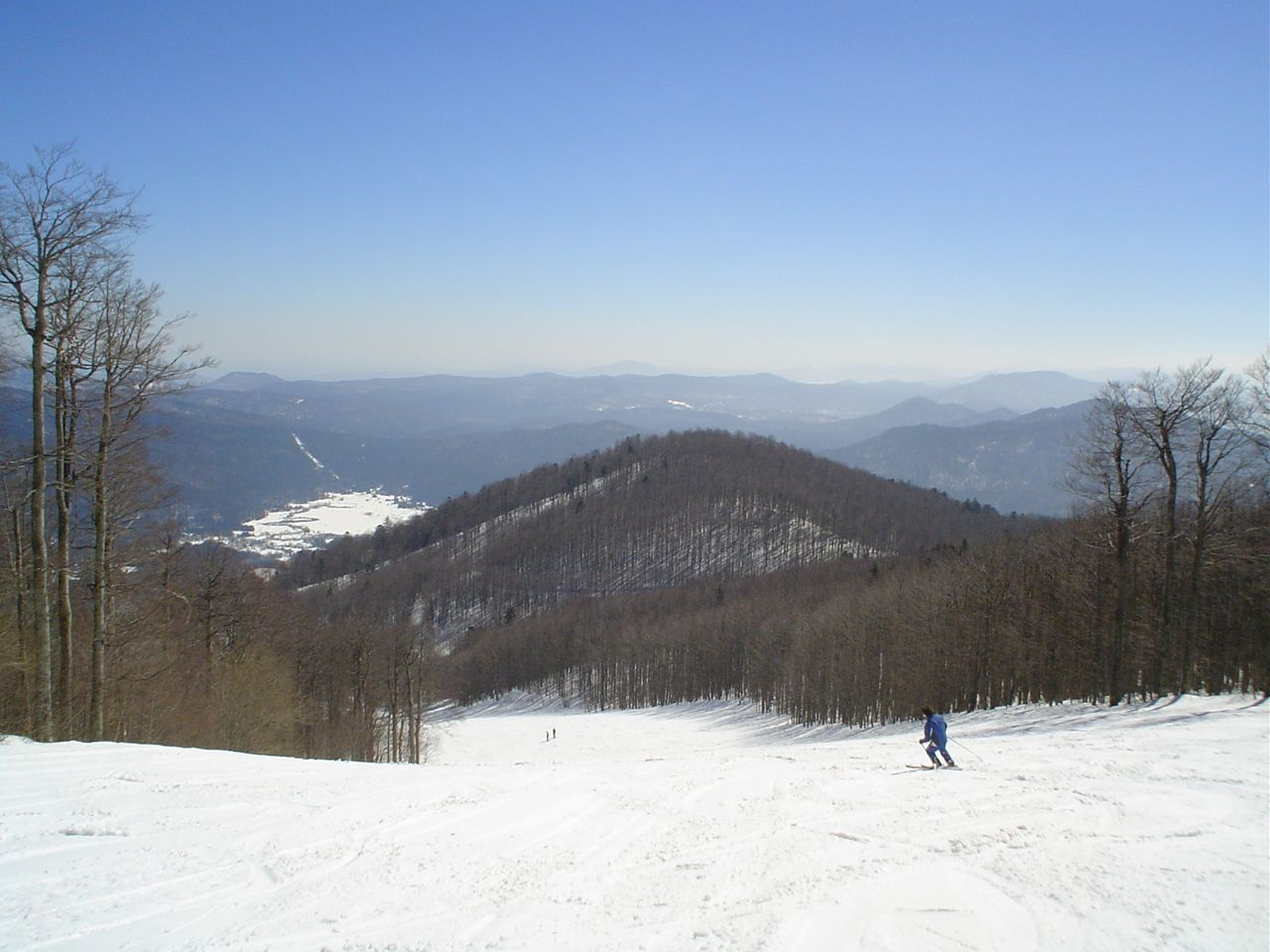
Bjelolasica piste

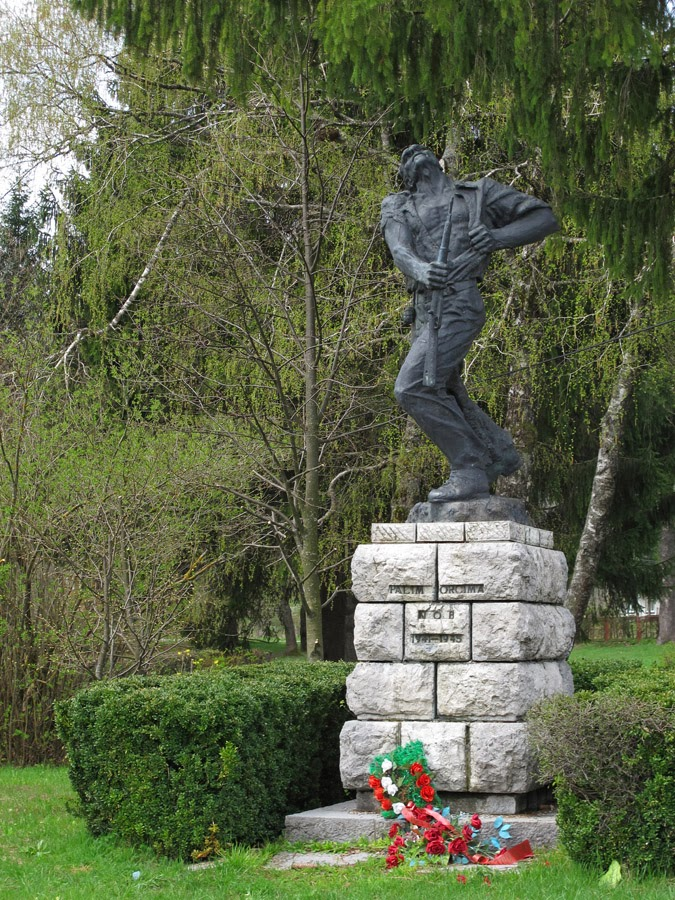
WWII monument

== Bibliography ==
=== Biology ===
- Šašić, Martina; Nahirnić, Ana; Tarmann, Gerhard M. (2016-12-31). "Zygaenidae (Lepidoptera) in the Lepidoptera collections of the Croatian Natural History Museum". Natura Croatica: Periodicum Musei Historiae Naturalis Croatici. 25 (2): 233–248. doi:10.20302/NC.2016.25.19. eISSN 1848-7386.

=== History ===
- Trgo, Fabijan, ed. (1964). Zbornik dokumenata i podataka o Narodno-oslobodilačkom ratu Jugoslovenskih naroda. Vol. V, 32.
- Banska vlast Banovine Hrvatske (1940e). "Srezovi". Godišnjak banske vlasti Banovine Hrvatske (in Croatian). Vol. 1. pp. 330–337.
- Lopašić, Radoslav (1894). "Urbar Modruški od g. 1486" [The Modruš Urbarium of the Year 1486]. Hrvatski urbari. Monumenta historico-iuridica Slavorum meridionalium (in Croatian). Vol. 5, 1. pp. 20–81.
  - Republished: Lopašić, Radoslav (1997). Abramović, Ignacije (ed.). Urbar modruški [The Modruš Urbarium] (in Croatian). Ogulin: Ogranak Matice hrvatske. ISBN 953-96393-4-4. Tirage: 500.

=== Linguistics ===
- Finka, Božidar (1977). "Štokavski ijekavski govori u Gorskom kotaru". Zbornik za filologiju i lingvistiku. 20 (1): 145–172. ISSN 0514-6143.
