= Trojvrh =

- Village
- Location within Croatia
- Coordinates: 45°07′N 15°19′E
- Country: Croatia
- County: Karlovac County
- City: Josipdol

Area
  - Total: 6.6 km^{2} (2.5 sq mi)

Population (2021)
  - Total: 15
  - Density: 2.3/km^{2} (5.9/sq mi)
- Time zone: UTC+1 (CET)
  - Summer (DST): UTC+2 (CEST)
- Postal code: 47303
- Area code: +385 047

Trojvrh is a village in Croatia, under the Josipdol township, in Karlovac County.

== History ==
On 5–6 August 1941, the Ustaše of Josipdol placed all the Serbs of Josipdol and its environs under house arrest. The Serbs mostly obeyed, so the arrests the Ustaše made on 6–7 August were mostly successful. On the 6th the arrests were made between 21:00 and 23:00 in Josipdol, Vajin Vrh and Vojnovac. According to witness Branko Sedlar, most of the arrestees were killed in Podveljun near Josipdol. On the 7th, the same Ustaše massacred 45 people in Trojvrh, and arrested 41 more in Josipdol, Vajin Vrh and Vojnovac. They intended to kill the new arrestees, but the Italians intervened and they were released. An Ustaša functionary arrived in Josipdol, who released all arrestees and ordered the killing to stop. On the 12th, the mourning Serb women demonstrated in Josipdol, requesting of the Italians to hold a trial for the murderers. While this did not take place, the Croat men fled to Hum, remaining there throughout August.

Around July 8, the Ogulin kotar began the process of deporting the families to the Sisak concentration camp on a list of 55 people marked for moving to make room for Slovene arrivals, from Jasenak, Josipdol, Munjava, Trojvrh and Vajin Vrh. The deportations were never carried out thanks to Pavelić interrupting the process, but thanks to the mass arrests scaring the Serbs off, none of the attempted arrests in this area succeeded, since none of the named could be found at their house. So great was the fear that women would flee at the sound of a suspicious car. (Note: "Zbog učestalih zločina žene budno paze na svaki auto i čim opaze nekakav dolazak sumnjivog automobila, odmah bježe.") So the kotarski predstojnik of Ogulin proposed to wait 8 to 10 days until the atmosphere was calmer.

== Demographics ==
Village of Trojvrh: Population trends 1857–2021
v

population	495	483	560	408	365	428	559	618	419	324	279	216	142	96	40	32	15
	1857	1869	1880	1890	1900	1910	1921	1931	1948	1953	1961	1971	1981	1991	2001	2011	2021

Note:Od 1857. do 1880. sadrži podatke za naselje Vojnovac, a od 1910. do 1948. dio podataka za isto naselje. Sources: Croatian Bureau of Statistics publications

== Governance ==
On 1 January 1894, Vajin Vrh and Trojvrh, until then part of Plaški obćina, were annexed by Josipdol obćina.

== Bibliography ==
=== History ===
- Lopašić, Radoslav (1894). "Urbar Modruški od g. 1486" [The Modruš Urbarium of the Year 1486]. Hrvatski urbari. Monumenta historico-iuridica Slavorum meridionalium (in Croatian). Vol. 5, 1. pp. 20–81.
  - Republished: Lopašić, Radoslav (1997). Abramović, Ignacije (ed.). Urbar modruški [The Modruš Urbarium] (in Croatian). Ogulin: Ogranak Matice hrvatske. ISBN 953-96393-4-4. Tirage: 500.
