= Vojnovac =

- Village
- Location within Croatia
- Coordinates: 45°08′N 15°20′E
- Country: Croatia
- County: Karlovac County
- City: Josipdol

Area
  - Total: 2.8 km^{2} (1.1 sq mi)

Population (2021)
  - Total: 74
  - Density: 26/km^{2} (68/sq mi)
- Time zone: UTC+1 (CET)
  - Summer (DST): UTC+2 (CEST)
- Postal code: 47303
- Area code: +385 047

Vojnovac is a village in Croatia, under the Josipdol township, in Karlovac County.

== History ==
=== WWII ===
On 5–6 August 1941, the Ustaše of Josipdol placed all the Serbs of Josipdol and its environs under house arrest. The Serbs mostly obeyed, so the arrests the Ustaše made on 6–7 August were mostly successful. On the 6th the arrests were made between 21:00 and 23:00 in Josipdol, Vajin Vrh and Vojnovac. According to witness Branko Sedlar, most of the arrestees were killed in Podveljun near Josipdol. On the 7th, the day the same Ustaše massacred 45 people in Trojvrh, they arrested 41 more in Josipdol, Vajin Vrh and Vojnovac. They intended to kill the new arrestees, but the Italians intervened and they were released. An Ustaša functionary arrived in Josipdol, who released all arrestees and ordered the killing to stop. On the 12th, the mourning Serb women demonstrated in Josipdol, requesting of the Italians to hold a trial for the murderers. While this did not take place, the Croat men fled to Hum, remaining there throughout August.

=== Recent ===
On 25 March 2022 at 18:32 the ŽVOC Karlovac received a call about a wildfire in the area. 6.25 hectares (15.4 acres) burned by the time it was put out at 19:56 by DVD Josipdol.

== Demographics ==
Village of Vojnovac: Population trends 1857–2021
v

population				164	238	207	178	40	48	198	183	187	178	160	144	94	74
	1857	1869	1880	1890	1900	1910	1921	1931	1948	1953	1961	1971	1981	1991	2001	2011	2021

Note:Od 1857. do 1880. podaci su sadržani u naselju Trojvrh, kao i dio podataka od 1910. do 1948. Sources: Croatian Bureau of Statistics publications
