= Josephina (road) =

Historic road in Croatia

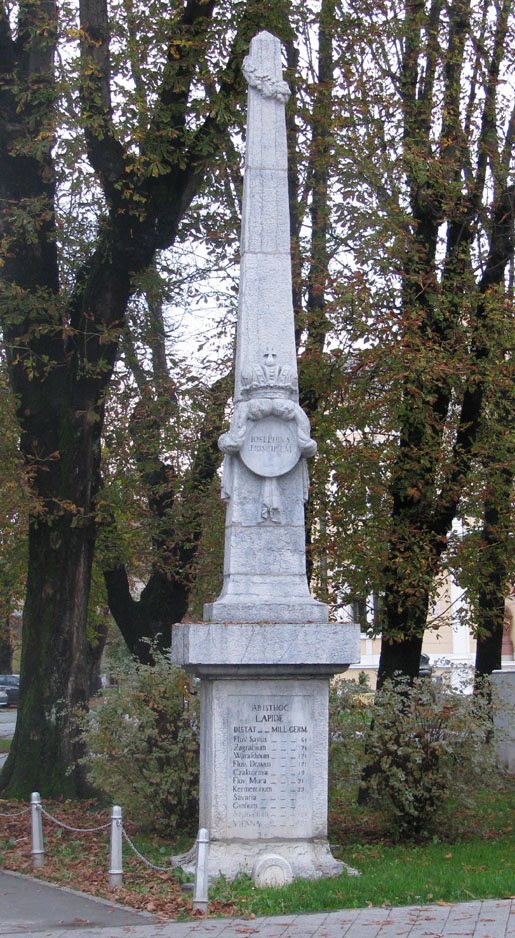
Via Josephina starting obelisk in Karlovac

The Josephina (Croatian: Jozefina (Note: Croatian pronunciation: [jozefǐːna]) or Jozefinska cesta; (Note: [jozěfiːnskaː cěsta]) German: Josefiner Straße) (Note: German pronunciation: [josəfinɐ ʃtʁaːsə]) is a historic road in Croatia that connects Senj and thus the Adriatic coast and Karlovac and the Pannonian plain. It crosses the Dinaric Alps via the Vratnik pass (700 metres (2,300 feet) above sea level) between Senj and Brinje and the Kapela Pass between Brinje and Josipdol.

Vratnik pass, currently a part of the D23 road, was already in use during Roman time as a salt road, and it became important for timber and other goods in the Middle Ages. However, the first well documented road built along the route was Via Josephina named after Joseph II, Holy Roman Emperor who commissioned its construction in 1775. Latin inscriptions carved in rock along the original Via Josephina route completed in 1779 testify that the Emperor travelled through the Vratnik pass on horseback when he realized that the route between Senj, as a major fortress on Adriatic coast, and the hinterland was nearly impassable. Legend has it that this happened when he fell from his horse near Vratnik Pass. Even though the incident is impossible to verify, the town of Josipdol to the east of the mountain pass is named after the Holy Roman Emperor.

In 1775, Joseph II indeed commissioned construction of the route, exactly 100 kilometres (62 miles) long, from Vincenc Struppi, a military engineer, and the road, named after the Emperor, was completed in 1779. The original route comprised very steep sections and 20% inclines were not uncommon. There was even one climb at a 30% grade. Because of this the road was modified and extended by 15 kilometres (9.3 miles), in order to remove such steep sections. The first reconstruction was carried out as early as late 18th century, and another one between 1833 and 1845 managed by Field Marshal Josip Filip Vukasović and Josip Kajetan Knežić respectively. Subsequent modifications were not as significant. The road was paved in 1950, when the last minor modifications of the route were executed.

The route was distinguished by mile markers along the route, an obelisk in Karlovac marking the beginning of the road and a specially built gate in Senj marking its end. Most remarkably the original road included a stone bridge across three spans in Tounj, which was expanded during the reconstruction of 1845 and now has two levels. The upper level was destroyed during World War II, but it was rebuilt in the 1950s.
