= Cerovnik =

- Village
- Location within Croatia
- Coordinates: 45°15′N 15°30′E
- Country: Croatia
- County: Karlovac
- Municipality: Josipdol

Area
  - Total: 8.4 km^{2} (3.2 sq mi)

Population (2021)
  - Total: 131
  - Density: 16/km^{2} (40/sq mi)
- Time zone: UTC+1 (CET)
  - Summer (DST): UTC+2 (CEST)

Cerovnik is a village in the municipality of Josipdol in Karlovac County in Croatia. It lies below the Kapela mountain. According to the 2001 census, the town has 167 inhabitants.

On Statehood Day 2008, the village unveiled a monument to the 156 villagers who died in the Second World War. Among those killed in the war was the Catholic priest Dragutin Fifka who was killed by Chetniks on May 24, 1943.

The town was mined during the Croatian War of Independence. In the 2000s (decade) the process of demining the area began.

== Bibliography ==
=== History ===
- Lopašić, Radoslav (1894). "Urbar Modruški od g. 1486" [The Modruš Urbarium of the Year 1486]. Hrvatski urbari. Monumenta historico-iuridica Slavorum meridionalium (in Croatian). Vol. 5, 1. pp. 20–81.
  - Republished: Lopašić, Radoslav (1997). Abramović, Ignacije (ed.). Urbar modruški [The Modruš Urbarium] (in Croatian). Ogulin: Ogranak Matice hrvatske. ISBN 953-96393-4-4. Tirage: 500.
