= Prokike =

- Village
- Interactive map of Prokike
- Location within Croatia
- Coordinates: 44.98559°N 15.06814°E
- Country: Croatia
- County: Lika-Senj
- Municipality: Brinje

Area
  - Total: 7.7 sq mi (20.0 km^{2})

Population (2021)
  - Total: 59
  - Density: 7.6/sq mi (3.0/km^{2})
- Time zone: UTC+1 (CET)
  - Summer (DST): UTC+2 (CEST)

Prokike is a village in Brinje, Croatia. It is connected by the D23 road.
