= Sabljaki Modruški =

- Village
- Location within Croatia
- Coordinates: 45°07′N 15°17′E
- Country: Croatia
- County: Karlovac County
- City: Josipdol

Area
  - Total: 12.6 km^{2} (4.9 sq mi)

Population (2021)
  - Total: 32
  - Density: 2.5/km^{2} (6.6/sq mi)
- Time zone: UTC+1 (CET)
  - Summer (DST): UTC+2 (CEST)
- Postal code: 47303
- Area code: +385 047

Sapljaki Modruški is a village in Croatia, under the Josipdol township, in Karlovac County. Vyhul mi péro
