= Kunić =

Kunić Кунић
- Village
- Location within Croatia
- Coordinates: 45.11°N 15.31°E
- Country: Croatia
- County: Karlovac
- Municipality: Plaški

Area
  - Total: 23.0 km^{2} (8.9 sq mi)

Population (2021)
  - Total: 36
  - Density: 1.6/km^{2} (4.1/sq mi)
- Time zone: UTC+1 (CET)
  - Summer (DST): UTC+2 (CEST)

Kunić (Serbian Cyrillic: Кунић) is a settlement in the municipality of Plaški, in the Lika region of Croatia. It is located 6.5 km northwest of the municipal seat at Plaški.

Prior to the administrative reorganization of SR Croatia, it was part of the municipality of Ogulin. During the Croatian War of Independence, the village was occupied by Serbs. The village is ecclesiastically part of the Serbian Orthodox Eparchy of upper Karlovac. The village has a Serb majority.

== History ==
The first Ustaša arrest in Plaški territory was Rade Vukas of Kunić, a travelling merchant, arrested on 26 May 1941.

== Demographics ==
Demographic history
Ethnic group	1948	1953	1961	1971	1981	1991	2001	2011
Serbs	n/a	n/a	263 (98.13%)	173 (97.19%)	92 (77.96%)	84 (94.38%)	29 (82.85%)	
Croats	n/a	n/a	4 (1.49%)	1 (0.56%)	0	5 (5.61%)	4 (11.42%)	
Yugoslavs	n/a	n/a	0	0	26 (22.03%)	0	0	
Others, unknown	n/a	n/a	1 (0.37%)	4 (2.24%)	0	0	2 (5.71%)	
Total	334	318	268	178	118	89	35	
