= Munjava Modruška =

- Village
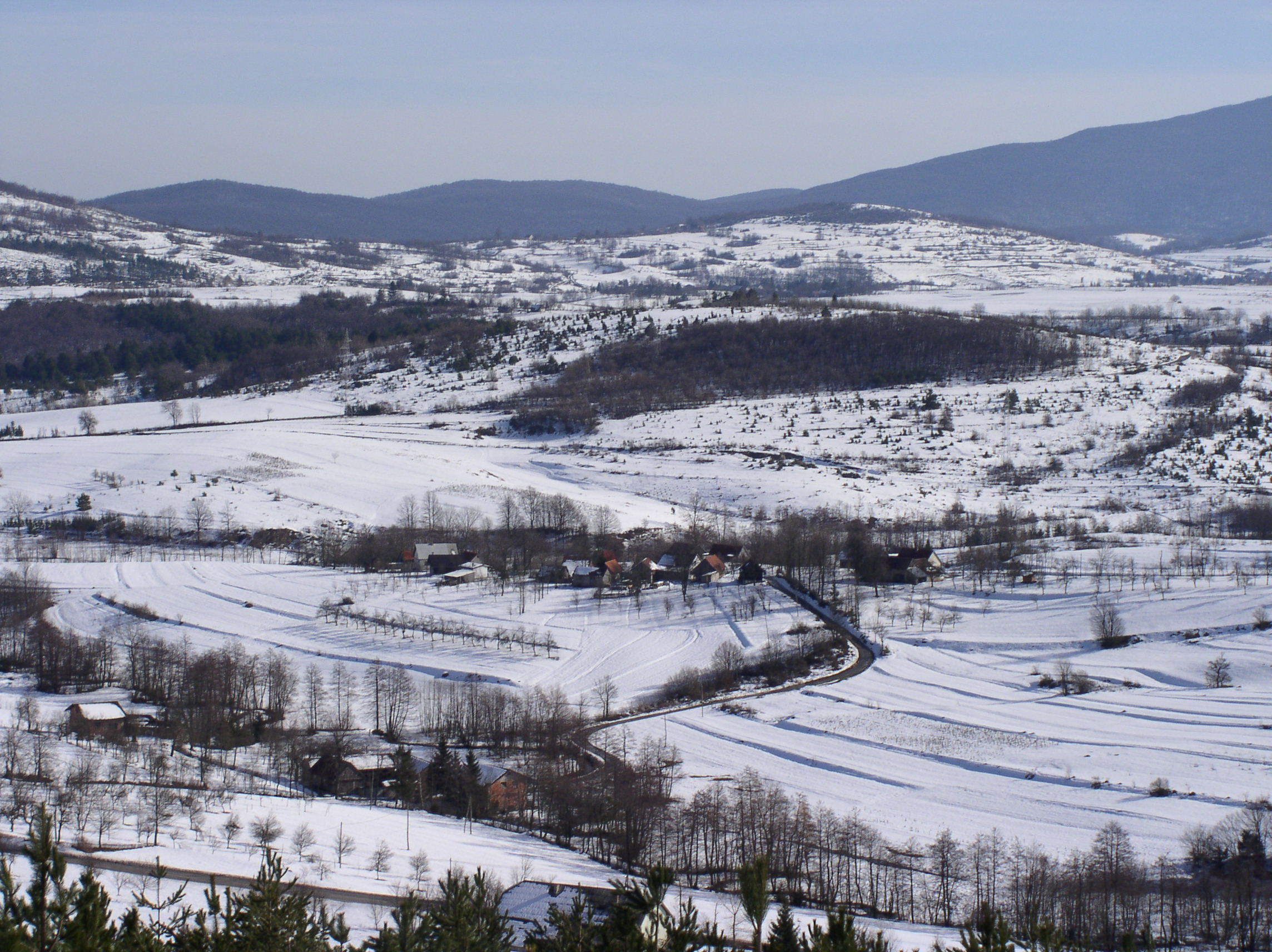

- Location within Croatia
- Coordinates: 45°09′N 15°17′E
- Country: Croatia
- County: Karlovac County
- City: Josipdol

Area
  - Total: 2.7 km^{2} (1.0 sq mi)

Population (2021)
  - Total: 58
  - Density: 21/km^{2} (56/sq mi)
- Time zone: UTC+1 (CET)
  - Summer (DST): UTC+2 (CEST)
- Postal code: 47303
- Area code: +385 047

Munjava Modruška is a village in Croatia, under the Josipdol township, in Karlovac County.
