= Antun Najžer =

Croatian physician and Ustaše movement member (1899-1946)

Antun Najžer, or Nadžer in some sources, (5 June 1899, Odranski Obrež − 18 September 1946) was a Croatian physician and member of the fascist Ustaše movement who served as the commander of the Sisak children's concentration camp in the Independent State of Croatia during World War II. He was dubbed the "Croatian Mengele" by survivors due to conducting medical experiments on his victims. For these crimes, in September 1946, he was sentenced to execution by firing squad.
