= Istočni Trojvrh =

- Village
- Location within Croatia
- Coordinates: 45.132559°N 15.343676°E
- Country: Croatia
- County: Karlovac County
- City: Josipdol

Area
  - Total: 1.7 km^{2} (0.66 sq mi)

Population (2021)
  - Total: 18
  - Density: 11/km^{2} (27/sq mi)
- Time zone: UTC+1 (CET)
  - Summer (DST): UTC+2 (CEST)
- Postal code: 47303
- Area code: +385 047

Istočni Trojvrh is a village in Croatia, under the Josipdol township, in Karlovac County.
