= Latin, Croatia =

Latin
- Village
- Interactive map of Latin
- Location within Croatia
- Coordinates: 45.106°N 15.355°E
- Country: Croatia
- County: Karlovac
- Municipality: Plaški

Area
  - Total: 14.9 km^{2} (5.8 sq mi)

Population (2021)
  - Total: 154
  - Density: 10.3/km^{2} (26.8/sq mi)
- Time zone: UTC+1 (CET)
  - Summer (DST): UTC+2 (CEST)

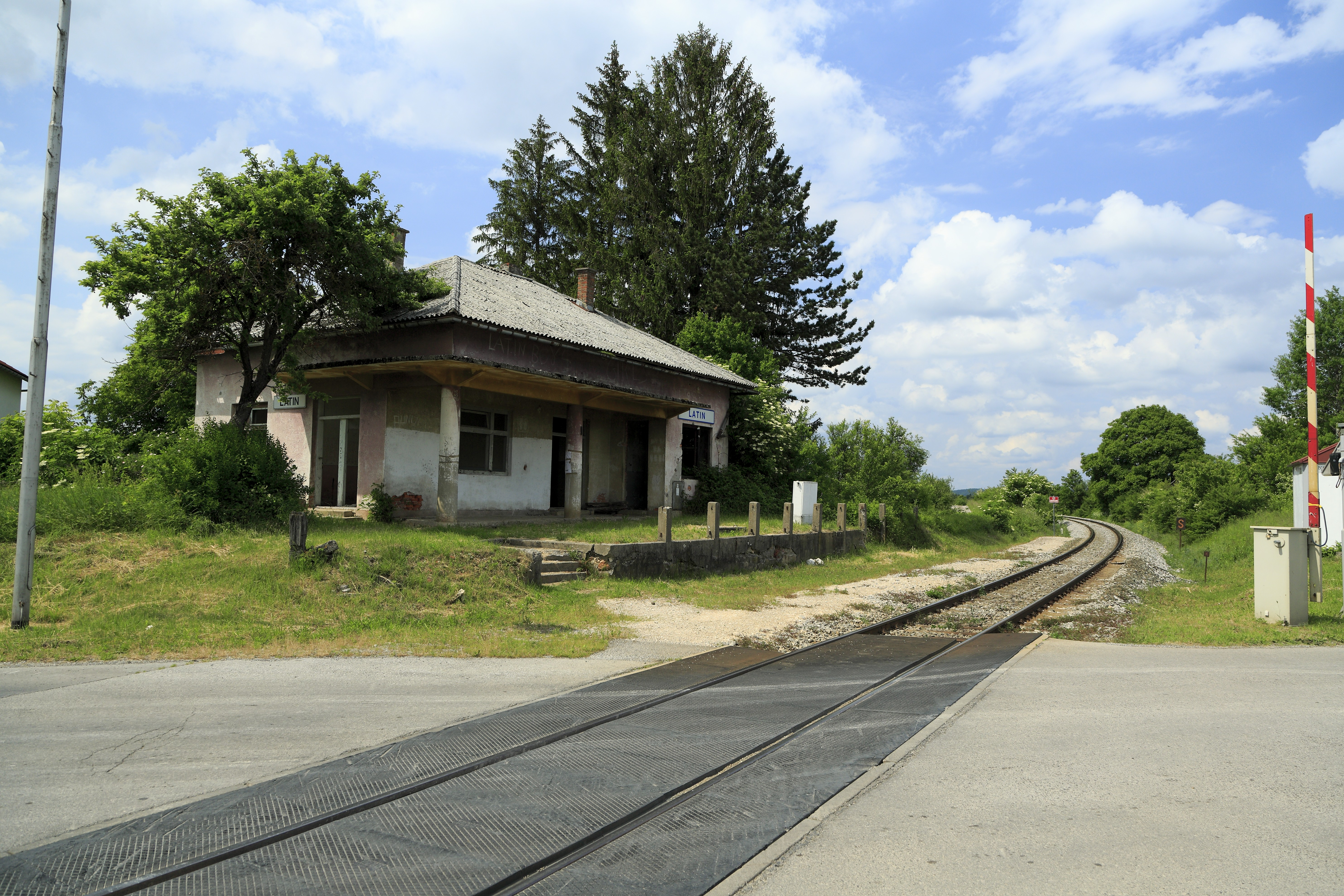
Stajalište Latin

Latin is a village in the municipality of Plaški, in the Lika region of Croatia.

== Demographics ==
Village of Latin: Population trends 1857–2021
v

population	603	661	629	649	682	672	660	841	619	681	613	568	446	407	192	196	154
	1857	1869	1880	1890	1900	1910	1921	1931	1948	1953	1961	1971	1981	1991	2001	2011	2021

Sources: Croatian Bureau of Statistics publications

== Bibliography ==
=== History ===
- Lopašić, Radoslav (1894). "Urbar Modruški od g. 1486" [The Modruš Urbarium of the Year 1486]. Hrvatski urbari. Monumenta historico-iuridica Slavorum meridionalium (in Croatian). Vol. 5, 1. pp. 20–81.
  - Republished: Lopašić, Radoslav (1997). Abramović, Ignacije (ed.). Urbar modruški [The Modruš Urbarium] (in Croatian). Ogulin: Ogranak Matice hrvatske. ISBN 953-96393-4-4. Tirage: 500.
