= Selište Drežničko =

Coordinates: 44°56′42″N 15°37′41″E

- Village
- Interactive map of Selište Drežničko
- Country: Croatia

Area
  - Total: 6.8 sq mi (17.5 km^{2})

Population (2021)
  - Total: 288
  - Density: 42.6/sq mi (16.5/km^{2})
- Time zone: UTC+1 (CET)
  - Summer (DST): UTC+2 (CEST)

Selište Drežničko is a village in Croatia. It is located near Plitvice Lakes National Park and is connected by the D42 highway.
