= Salopeki Modruški =

- Village
- Location within Croatia
- Coordinates: 45°09′N 15°15′E
- Country: Croatia
- County: Karlovac County
- City: Josipdol

Area
  - Total: 5.1 km^{2} (2.0 sq mi)

Population (2021)
  - Total: 49
  - Density: 9.6/km^{2} (25/sq mi)
- Time zone: UTC+1 (CET)
  - Summer (DST): UTC+2 (CEST)
- Postal code: 47303
- Area code: +385 047

Salopeki Modruški is a village in Croatia, under the Josipdol township, in Karlovac County.

== Bibliography ==
=== History ===
- Lopašić, Radoslav (1894). "Urbar Modruški od g. 1486" [The Modruš Urbarium of the Year 1486]. Hrvatski urbari. Monumenta historico-iuridica Slavorum meridionalium (in Croatian). Vol. 5, 1. pp. 20–81.
  - Republished: Lopašić, Radoslav (1997). Abramović, Ignacije (ed.). Urbar modruški [The Modruš Urbarium] (in Croatian). Ogulin: Ogranak Matice hrvatske. ISBN 953-96393-4-4. Tirage: 500.
