= Oštarije =

Coordinates: 45°13′N 15°16′E

- Village
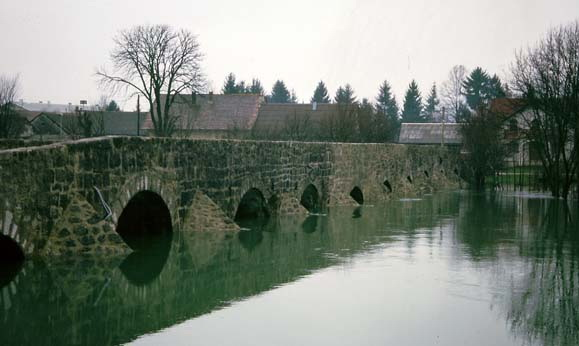
- Marshal Marmont bridge in Ostarije, Croatia
- Interactive map of Oštarije
- Country: Croatia
- County: Karlovac County
- Municipality: Josipdol

Area
  - Total: 24.4 km^{2} (9.4 sq mi)

Population (2021)
  - Total: 1,300
  - Density: 53/km^{2} (140/sq mi)
- Time zone: UTC+1 (CET)
  - Summer (DST): UTC+2 (CEST)

Oštarije is a village in the municipality Josipdol in Karlovac County, Croatia. It is connected by the D42 highway.

== History ==
A 2 July was issued order for all Velike župe, including that of Modruš (with seat in Ogulin), to make room for 2500 Slovenes each, who were to occupy the homes of 2500 Serbs, to be deported to the GMS, prioritising businessmen and merchants. Oštarije was to accommodate 100 Slovenes. As of mid-July, there were not enough empty Serb homes to accommodate the exchange.

== Climate ==
Two weather stations exist there: one at an elevation of 318 metres (1,043 ft) in the train station, and one at an elevation of 329 metres (1,079 ft) at Ravnice. The minimum recorded temperature for the winter of 2024–2025 was −11.7 °C (10.9 °F) at the train station, on February 20, and −13.8 °C (7.2 °F) at Ravnice, on February 19.

== Demographics ==
In 1895, the obćina of Oštarije (court at Oštarije), with an area of 33 square kilometres (13 mi^{2}), belonged to the kotar of Ogulin (Ogulin court and electoral district) in the županija of Modruš-Rieka (Ogulin high court and financial board). There were 459 houses, with a population of 2754. Its 2 villages and 12 hamlets were divided for taxation purposes into 2 porezne obćine, under the Ogulin office.

== Tourism ==
- Marmont Bridge

== Bibliography ==
=== Folklore ===
- Strohal, Rudolf (1904). Hrvatskih narodnih pripovijedaka, Knjiga III: Narodne pripovijetke iz grada Rijeke, trgovišta Mrkoplja i Ravne Gore, te sela Broda na Kupi i Oštarija. Karlovac.

=== Genealogy ===
- Salopek, Hrvoje (1999). Stari rodovi Ogulinsko - modruške udoline : podrijetlo, povijest, rasprostranjenost, seobe i prezimena stanovništva Ogulina, Oštarija, Josipdola, Zagorja Ogulinskog, Modruša i okolnih naselja (in Serbo-Croatian). Ogulin, Zagreb: Matica hrvatska, Centar za kulturu, Hrvatska matica iseljenika. ISBN 953-6525-18-6. 2nd ed. 2000, ISBN 953-6525-18-6.
- Salopek, Hrvoje (2007). Ogulinsko - modruški rodovi: podrijetlo, povijest, rasprostranjenost, seobe i prezimena stanovništva ogulinskog kraja (in Serbo-Croatian). Ogulin, Zagreb: Matica hrvatska, Hrvatska matica iseljenika, Hrvatsko rodoslovno društvo "Pavao Ritter Vitezović". ISBN 978-953-6525-45-4.

=== History ===
- Lopašić, Radoslav (1894). "Urbar Modruški od g. 1486" [The Modruš Urbarium of the Year 1486]. Hrvatski urbari. Monumenta historico-iuridica Slavorum meridionalium (in Croatian). Vol. 5, 1. pp. 20–81.
  - Republished: Lopašić, Radoslav (1997). Abramović, Ignacije (ed.). Urbar modruški [The Modruš Urbarium] (in Croatian). Ogulin: Ogranak Matice hrvatske. ISBN 953-96393-4-4. Tirage: 500.
- Fras, Franz Julius (1835). "Ostarer-Kompagnie" [Oštarije Company]. Vollständige Topographie der Karlstädter-Militärgrenze mit besonderer Rücksicht auf die Beschreibung der Schlösser, Ruinen, Inscriptionen und andern dergleichen Ueberbleibseln von Antiquitäten: nach Anschauung und aus den zuverlässigsten Quellen dargestellt für reisende, und zur Förderung der Vaterlandsliebe (in German). Zagreb: Franz Suppan. pp. 298–304.
