= Croatian Olympic Centre Bjelolasica =

Sports complex in Croatia

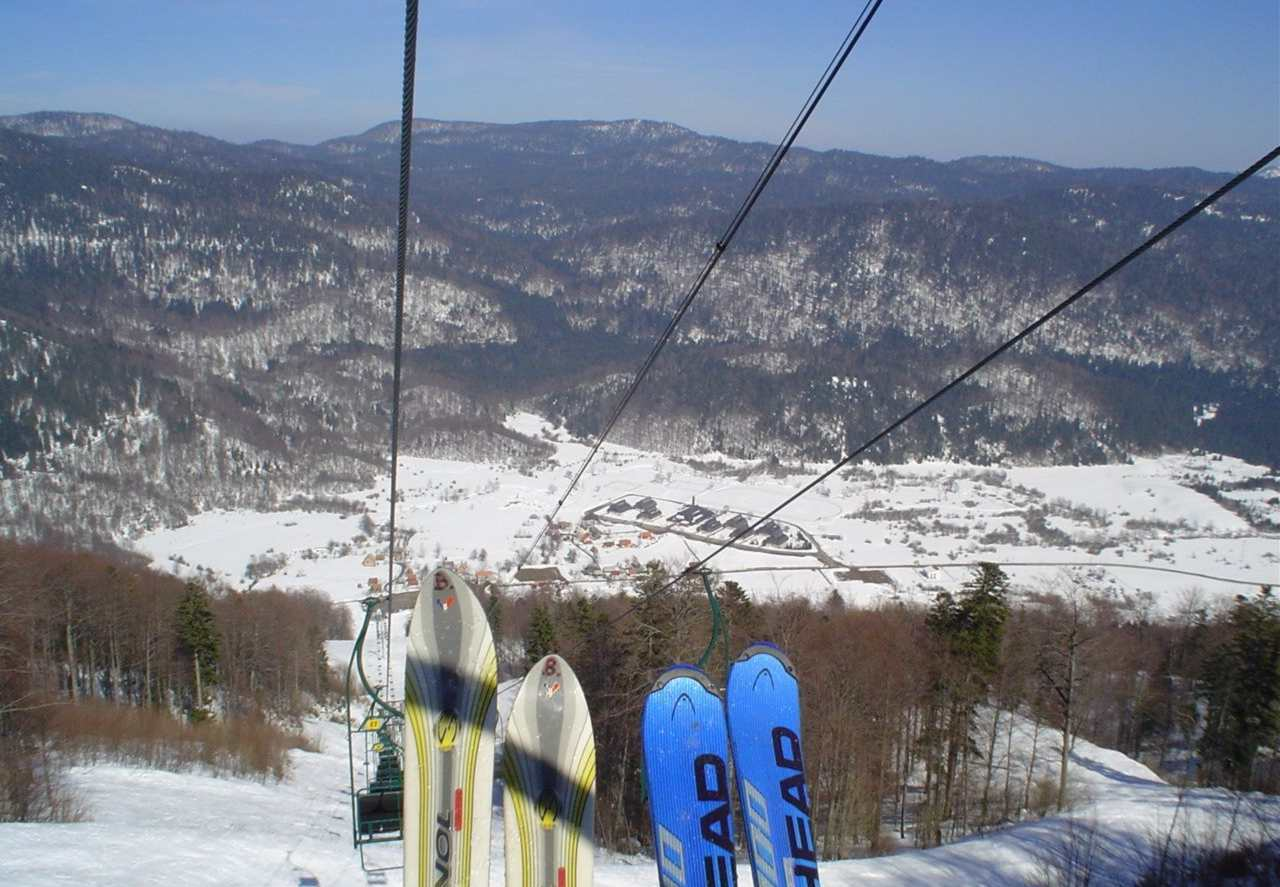
Bjelolasica

Croatian Olympic Centre Bjelolasica is a sports and tourism complex located in Gorski Kotar, Croatia.

== Overview ==
It is located 27 km to the west from Ogulin, in a vast valley at 620 meters above the sea level. It is only an hour ride from Zagreb and Rijeka and has around 160 days in the year natural snow.

Thanks to the rich and clear forest Bjelolasica is well known for the hunting and fishing tourism.

Tourist complex was renovated in 1998 and today it disposes of 150 rooms with 450 beds, restaurant, cocktail bar, social facilities, congress hall, sports hall, fitness club and sauna.

Indoor sport facilities include a large sports hall, fitness club and sauna which are located in the central pavilion of the Tourist Complex of Bjelolasica. Outdoor facilities include football playground, running track, multipurpose playground for basketball, volleyball and handball, tennis courts, bowling court, mini-golf court and other smaller courts.

In the immediate vicinity of the village of Bjelolasica, there are more than 6 km of skiing paths, sledging and snow-boarding, and all paths are connected by a system of cableways with three double chair lifts and three ski lifts. Wellness services are also included. Because of that Bjelolasica is a popular training place for Croatian athletes.

In 2021, the Slovak company Bioelektro Energy acquired the Olympic Center.
