= Munjava =

- Village
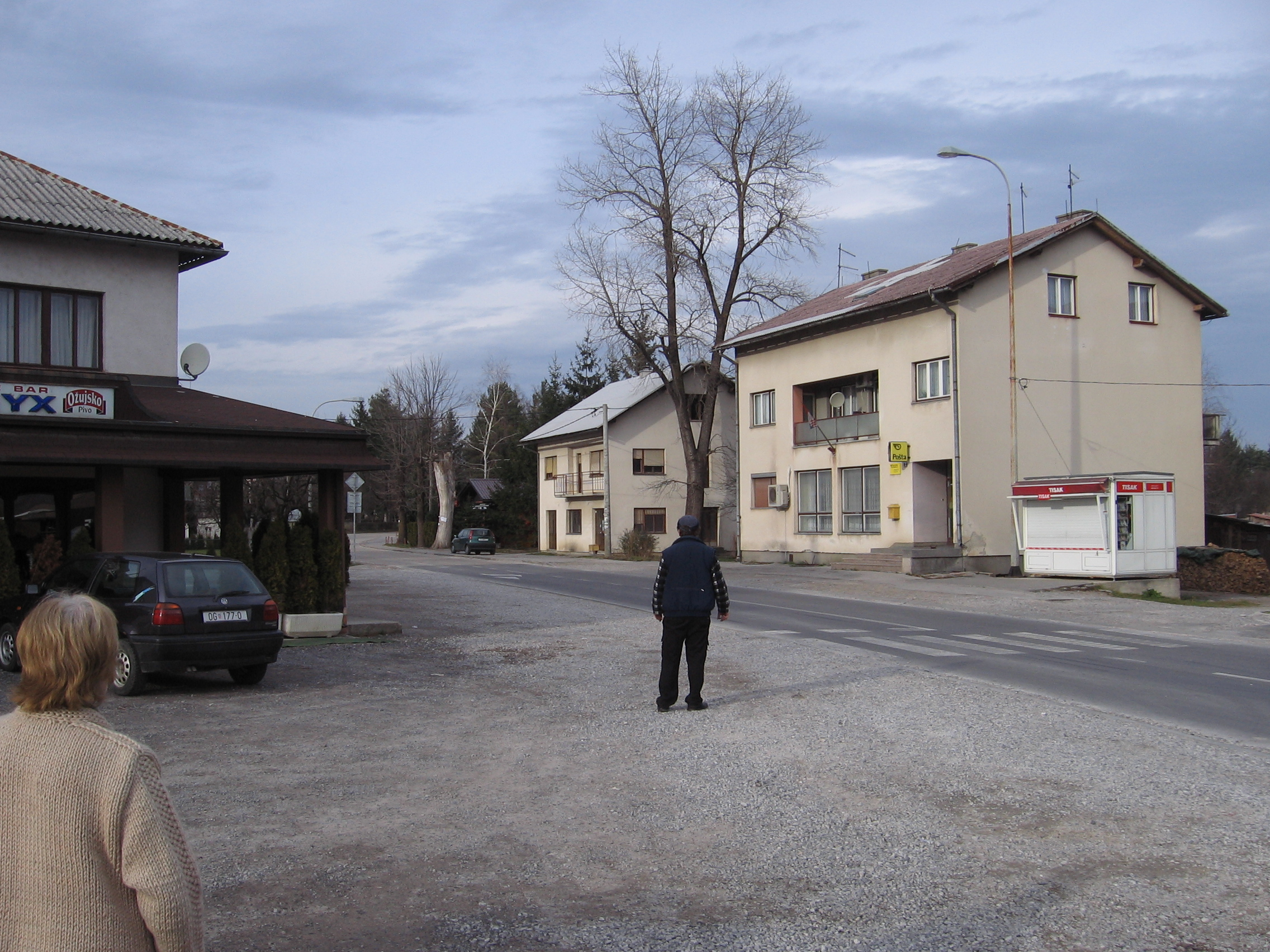
- Street in munjava

- Location within Croatia
- Coordinates: 45°11′N 15°17′E
- Country: Croatia
- County: Karlovac County
- City: Josipdol

Area
  - Total: 2.6 km^{2} (1.0 sq mi)

Population (2021)
  - Total: 49
  - Density: 19/km^{2} (49/sq mi)
- Time zone: UTC+1 (CET)
  - Summer (DST): UTC+2 (CEST)
- Postal code: 47303
- Area code: +385 047

Munjava is a village in Croatia, under the Josipdol township, in Karlovac County.

== History ==
Around July 8, the Ogulin kotar began the process of deporting the families to the Sisak concentration camp on a list of 55 people marked for moving to make room for Slovene arrivals, from Jasenak, Josipdol, Munjava, Trojvrh and Vajin Vrh. The deportations were never carried out thanks to Pavelić interrupting the process, but thanks to the mass arrests scaring the Serbs off, none of the attempted arrests in this area succeeded, since none of the named could be found at their house. So great was the fear that women would flee at the sound of a suspicious car. (Note: "Zbog učestalih zločina žene budno paze na svaki auto i čim opaze nekakav dolazak sumnjivog automobila, odmah bježe.") So the kotarski predstojnik of Ogulin proposed to wait 8 to 10 days until the atmosphere was calmer.

== Demographics ==
Village of Munjava: Population trends 1857–2021
v

population	329	243	173	275	266	268	301	333	226	228	229	217	218	228	198	237	49
	1857	1869	1880	1890	1900	1910	1921	1931	1948	1953	1961	1971	1981	1991	2001	2011	2021

Sources: Croatian Bureau of Statistics publications
