= Skradnik =

Coordinates: 45°13′N 15°19′E

- Village
- Interactive map of Skradnik
- Country: Croatia
- County: Karlovac County

Area
  - Total: 11.7 km^{2} (4.5 sq mi)

Population (2021)
  - Total: 374
  - Density: 32.0/km^{2} (82.8/sq mi)
- Time zone: UTC+1 (CET)
  - Summer (DST): UTC+2 (CEST)

Skradnik is a village in Croatia.
