= Plaški =

Plaški Плашки
- Municipality
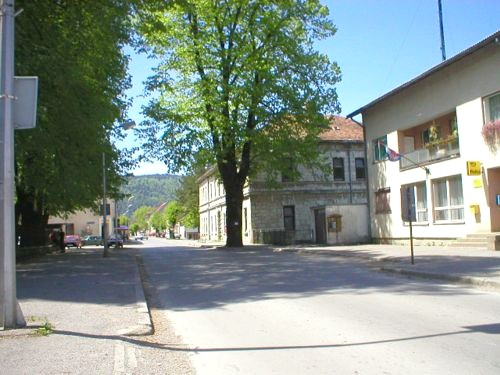
- Plaški

- Location within Croatia
- Coordinates: 45°05′N 15°22′E
- Country: Croatia
- County: Karlovac County

Area
  - Municipality: 156.5 km^{2} (60.4 sq mi)
  - Urban: 25.6 km^{2} (9.9 sq mi)

Population (2021)
  - Municipality: 1,650
  - Density: 10.5/km^{2} (27.3/sq mi)
  - Urban: 1,031
  - Urban density: 40.3/km^{2} (104/sq mi)
- Time zone: UTC+1 (CET)
  - Summer (DST): UTC+2 (CEST)
- Area code: 31
- Website: plaski.hr

Plaški is a village and a municipality in Karlovac County, Croatia. It is part of the region of Lika.

== Geography ==
Plaški is situated in the lower part of the Ogulin-Plaški valley. Together with Gorski kotar and Lika, the Ogulin-Plaški valley forms Mountainous Croatia. The town of Plaški is situated 28 km south from Ogulin and shares borders with municipalities of Ogulin, Josipdol and Saborsko.

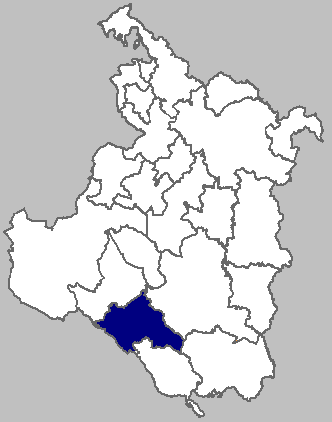
Image of Plaški municipality within Karlovac County

== Climate ==
Since records began in 1960, the highest temperature recorded at the local weather station was 39.1 °C (102.4 °F), on 8 August 2013. The coldest temperature was −28.5 °C (−19.3 °F), on 12 January 1985.

== Demographics ==
In 1895, the obćina of Plaški (court at Plaški), with an area of 289 square kilometres (112 mi^{2}) (highest in the županija), belonged to the kotar of Ogulin (Ogulin court but Plaški electoral district) in the županija of Modruš-Rieka (Ogulin high court and financial board). There were 1423 houses, with a population of 9187 (highest in Ogulin kotar). Its 8 villages and 116 hamlets were divided for taxation purposes into 10 porezne obćine, under the Ogulin office.

The municipality consists of several settlements:

- Janja Gora — 112 people
- Jezero — 77 people
- Kunić — 32 people
- Lapat — 215 people
- Latin — 196 people
- Međeđak — 100 people
- Plaški — 1,281 people
- Pothum Plaščanski — 77 people

=== Language ===
Serbian and Croatian are co-official at the municipal level in Plaški. As of 2023, none of the legal requirements for the fulfillment of bilingual standards have been carried out. Cyrillic is not used on official building signage, street signs, traffic signs or seals. Cyrillic is not used on any official documents, nor are there public legal and administrative employees proficient in the script. Of the officially bilingual municipalities in Croatia, it shared not having Cyrillic even on official building signage only with Gračac and the recently officially bilingual Orehovica.

== History ==
In 33 BC the Romans, led by the future Emperor Octavian Augustus, won a battle against an Illyrian tribe, the Japods, in the area east of Plaški. Roman coins have been found in Plaški which proves that this region was inhabited in Roman times.

The name Plaški was first mentioned in 1163 in documents of the Diocese of Split of the Roman Catholic Church. The second mention of the village dates from 1185 and relates to the establishment of the new Krbava diocese, which the parish of Plaški became a part of. Plaški county (Comitatus Plazy) was a separate administrative region until 1193, when it became part of Modruš county and came to be owned by the Frankopan family. In the name of Frankopans Plaški was governed by the Zebić family of nobles, who were their loyal vassals (even today a part of Plaški is called Zebići).

In 1492 just before the Battle of Krbava Plaški was raided by the Turks led by Jakub-Paša and Plaški was abandoned. In a document of Bernardin Frankopan from 1500 Plaški is described as defense fort against the Turks. Another document from 1550 confirms Plaški's status as defense fort and also mentions it as one of four centres in the Military Frontier of the Habsburg Empire.

By decision of the Military Council in Graz, Serbs were allowed to resettle the area. The Serbs came in three waves: 1609, 1639 and 1666. Together with Tounj, Plaški was centre of a military company that was part of Ogulin's regiment. The Eparchy of Upper Karlovac of the Serbian Orthodox Church was founded in 1711 and had its first seat in Gomirje monastery and from 1721 to 1941 the seat was in Plaški. The Orthodox cathedral was built from 1756 to 1763.

=== WWII ===
==== 1941 ====
After the invasion of Yugoslavia in April 1941 Plaški was initially occupied by the Royal Italian Army, who threw children confections and adults cigars upon arrival. According to eyewitness Simo Šumonja, 2000 Italians were stationed in Plaški.

On 16 April 1941, Ustaša Josip Tomljenović ordered the Croat corporal Mirko Žepalo of the Plaški gendarmerie, which at the time consisted of 5 Serbs and himself, to disarm his colleagues and fill their positions with Croats loyal to the NDH. Žepalo was reluctant, but the next day he told his colleagues, "Gentlemen, what must be, must be" (Croatian: Gospodo, što mora biti, mora), upon which they turned in their arms and returned to their homes.

April and the first half of May that year were relatively peaceful. About 150 Serbian villagers from Plaški and its environs surrendered their weapons to the local gendarmerie during this time. There were no mass imprisonments here yet, but in and around Plaški, 12 economically and politically prominent people were placed under house arrest.

On 28 May in the afternoon, the first mass arrests were made by the Ustaše in Plaški, including of the priest, the episcopal vicar, the innkeeper, the chief of the railway station Plaški, the baker Pero Klipa from Plaški, a merchant from Plaški and a teacher from Lička Jesenica. Initially, they were held in the jail in Plaški, then transferred to the Ogulin castle. There, they were held for about 20 days, forced to sing "Sprem'te se, sprem'te četnici" (a Chetnik anthem) while sweeping the streets by their captors. Around 6 June, late in the evening, they were led out of the Ogulin tower into its courtyard and lined up in a zig-zagging column. They were all forced to sign a document with "I the undersigned with my own hand sign that in the time of the Kingdom of Yugoslavia I acted against the interests of the Croat nation, the Ustaša movement and the Poglavnik" (Croatian: Ja niže potpisani vlastoručno se potpisujem da sam za vrijeme Kraljevine Jugoslavije radio protiv interesa hrvatskog naroda, ustaškog pokreta i Poglavnika). The next day, they were transported by train to the Danica concentration camp. Pero Klipa survived thnks to his Italian father in law, who in while Plaški assisted the Italians there in writing a letter requesting his release, which came on 6 November.

Beginning in the first days of June and throughout the month, the Serbian Orthodox priests, monks and members of the ecclesiastical court of Plaški were arrested for questioning at Ogulin, starting with Milan Dokmanović. A total of 19 Orthodox priests were arrested. Only 1 escaped, being on an official trip at the time. Also in early June, župan Jurica Marković confiscated the furniture from the episcopal house in Plaški. In early July, the bishop in Plaški, the prota and činovnik of the ecclesiastical court in Plaški and the catechist in Plaški had not yet been sent away. According to a 15 July document from the kotarski načelnik of Ogulin, all Orthodox priests from the territory of the kotar of Ogulin were sent to concentration camps, with the exception of the bishop in Plaški, who was too old.

Trains carrying concentration camp inmates from Ogulin to Gospić over the course of 50 days about twice a day and perhaps more by night, each train with about twenty wagons full of inmates. One of the inmates threw a piece of shoe with a letter tied to it out of the wagon at Plaški, which a child, Simo Šumonja, then carried to the post office. The letter explained that he was travelling from Danica to Gospić. These trains stopped passing through in August.

A 2 July was issued order for all Velike župe, including that of Modruš (with seat in Ogulin), to make room for 2500 Slovenes each, who were to occupy the homes of 2500 Serbs, to be deported to the GMS, prioritising businessmen and merchants. Plaški was to accommodate 800 Slovenes. As of mid-July, there were not enough empty Serb homes to accommodate the exchange.

On 30 July, many Serb villagers of Plaški were arrested at the market in Ogulin, having come there to sell. Beginning with the next market on 6 August, the Serbs stopped coming out of fear that it would happen a third time.

==== 1942 ====
At 2:30 on 20 June 1942, Plaški was attacked from all sides with rifle and machine gun fire by the Partisans. The attack lasted until 3:30, but was repelled without Axis losses and with unknown Partisan losses. The attack was a diversion for an operation that removed 12 metres (39 ft) of track, blocking railway traffic between Plaški and Vojnovac, but not for long.

On 4 July, Partisans destroyed 450 metres (1,480 ft) of track between Blato and Lička Jesenica. Italian soldiers arrived from Plaški on an armoured train and the Partisans retreated.

== Demographics ==
Before the Croatian War of Independence, Plaški was a municipality with a majority of Serb population. In the census of 2001, the town of Plaški had 1,468 with total municipality population of 2,292, of which 48.4% were Croats, and 46.1% Serbs. Much of the Croat population is made up of those forced to leave Bosnia replacing Serbs who, in 1995, fled during Operation Storm. The Serbs constituted 46% and Croats constituted 51% of the population in the 2011 census.

== Governance ==
On 1 January 1894, Vajin Vrh and Trojvrh, until then part of Plaški obćina, were annexed by Josipdol obćina.

== Infrastructure ==
In 1913, there were 8 gendarmeries in Delnice kotar: Ogulin, Drežnica, Generalski Stol, Jasenak, Saborsko, Josipdol, Modruš and Plaški.

== People ==
- Omar Pasha (born Mihajlo Latas, 1806–1871), Ottoman general and governor
- Peter Kokotowitsch (8 October 1890 – 12 July 1968) Wrestler – competed as a middleweight at the 1912 Summer Olympics

== Bibliography ==
=== History ===
- Jolić, Robert (2007). "Povijest župe Plaški" [The History of Plaški Parish] (PDF). Modruški zbornik (in Croatian). 1 (1): 71–124.
- Trgo, Fabijan, ed. (1964). Zbornik dokumenata i podataka o Narodno-oslobodilačkom ratu Jugoslovenskih naroda. Vol. V, 32.
- Lopašić, Radoslav (1894). "Urbar Modruški od g. 1486" [The Modruš Urbarium of the Year 1486]. Hrvatski urbari. Monumenta historico-iuridica Slavorum meridionalium (in Croatian). Vol. 5, 1. pp. 20–81.
  - Republished: Lopašić, Radoslav (1997). Abramović, Ignacije (ed.). Urbar modruški [The Modruš Urbarium] (in Croatian). Ogulin: Ogranak Matice hrvatske. ISBN 953-96393-4-4. Tirage: 500.
- Fras, Franz Julius (1835). "Plasscaner-Kompagnie" [Plaški Company]. Vollständige Topographie der Karlstädter-Militärgrenze mit besonderer Rücksicht auf die Beschreibung der Schlösser, Ruinen, Inscriptionen und andern dergleichen Ueberbleibseln von Antiquitäten: nach Anschauung und aus den zuverlässigsten Quellen dargestellt für reisende, und zur Förderung der Vaterlandsliebe (in German). Zagreb: Franz Suppan. pp. 309–313.
