= Mount Hum (Plaški) =

Mountain in Croatia

Hum
- Location within Croatia

Highest point
- Elevation: 863 m (2,831 ft)
- Coordinates: 45.135403°N 15.390783°E

Geography
- Location: Croatia
- Parent range: Dinaric Alps

Hum is a mountain in Croatia, an isolated cone-shaped mountain with a height of 863 metres (2,831 ft), located north of Plaški.
