= Sisak concentration camp =

Concentration camp in the Independent State of Croatia

Coordinates: 45.482619°N 16.372393°E

Sisak
- Concentration and transit camp
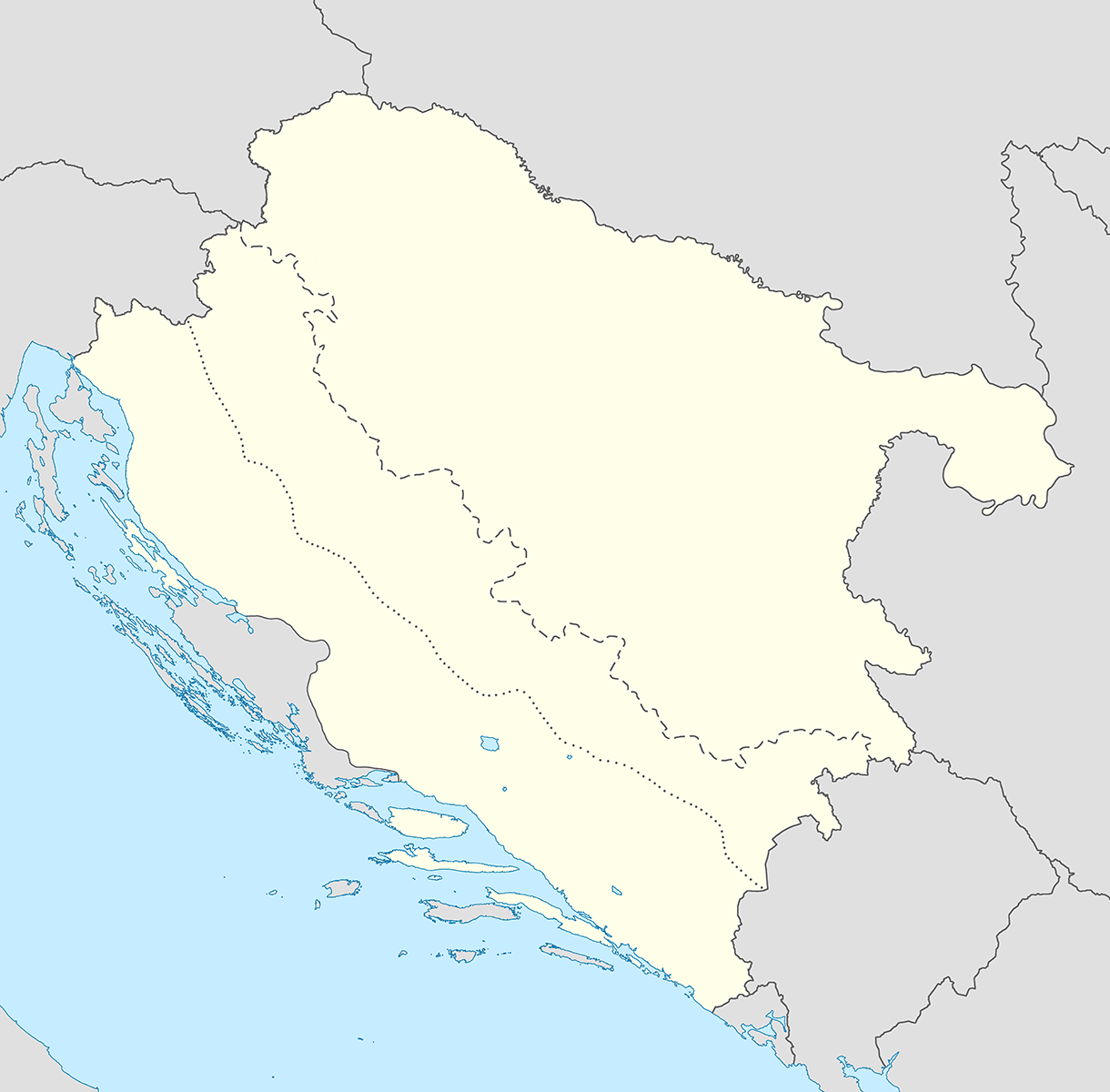
- Location of Sisak in the Independent State of Croatia. The dotted lines represent Zones I and II of Italian influence.
- Location: Sisak, Independent State of Croatia
- Operated by: Nazi Germany (Sisak I; until April 1944); Independent State of Croatia (Sisak II)
- Original use: Recreation centre, saltworks and primary school
- Operational: 1941–1945
- Inmates: Able-bodied Serb, Bosniak, and Roma prisoners bound for the Reich (Sisak I); Serb, Jewish and Roma children (Sisak II)
- Number of inmates: 6,693–7,000 (Sisak II)
- Killed: 1,160–1,600 (Sisak II)
- Notable inmates: Milja Toroman

The Sisak concentration camp was a concentration and transit camp located in the town of Sisak, in the Axis puppet state the Independent State of Croatia (NDH), from 1941 to 1945, during World War II. It consisted of two sub-camps, Sisak I and Sisak II. The former was used to intern adults destined for forced labour in the Reich and was established in 1941, while the latter was used to detain unaccompanied Serb—and to a lesser extent, Jewish and Roma—children who had been separated from their parents over the course of the conflict. Sisak I was operated by the Germans, whereas Sisak II was administered by the Ustaše, with some German gendarmes guarding its perimeter. The latter became operational in July–August 1942, receiving a group of children who had previously been detained at Mlaka.

Living conditions at the children's camp were poor, leading to a high mortality rate. According to survivors, some children were killed by being given poisoned milk or gruel laced with caustic soda. On other occasions, camp commander Antun Najžer administered children with lethal injections. Thousands of children were saved from the camp as a result of rescue efforts spearheaded by the humanitarian Diana Budisavljević and the local communist underground. Sisak II was dissolved in January 1943. The exact number of children who perished there is unknown, but estimates range from 1,160 to 1,600, largely as a result of starvation, thirst, typhus and neglect. In April 1944, the Germans ceded control of Sisak I to the Ustaše. It was shut down in January 1945 and its remaining inmates were dispatched to Jasenovac.

In September 1946, Najžer was convicted for his involvement in the atrocities that took place at the children's camp and sentenced to death by firing squad. Memorials commemorating the camp victims were demolished by Croatian forces in the early 1990s, during the Croatian War of Independence. Camp survivor Gabrijela Kolar's sculpture was spared, but has since fallen into a state of disrepair. In post-independence Croatia, the camp's main building was transformed into a theatre and renamed the Crystal Cube of Cheerfulness.

== Background ==
=== Interwar period ===
Ethnic tensions between Serbs and Croats increased following the establishment of the Kingdom of Serbs, Croats and Slovenes in the aftermath of World War I. During the interwar period, many Croats came to resent Serb political hegemony in the newly established state, which resulted in the passing of legislation that favoured Serb political, religious and business interests. Tensions flared in 1928, following the shooting of five Croatian parliamentary deputies by the Montenegrin Serb politician Puniša Račić in the country's parliament. Two died on the spot and two others were wounded but survived. A fifth, the opposition leader Stjepan Radić, was also wounded and died nearly two months later of complications attributed to the shooting. In January 1929, King Alexander instituted a royal dictatorship and renamed the country Yugoslavia. Shortly thereafter, the Croatian politician Ante Pavelić formed the Ustaše, a Croatian nationalist and fascist movement which sought to achieve Croatian independence through violent means. The Ustaše were outlawed in Yugoslavia, but received covert assistance from Benito Mussolini's Italy, which had territorial pretensions in Istria and Dalmatia. The Ustaše carried out a number of actions aimed at undermining Yugoslavia, most notably the Velebit uprising in 1932 and the assassination of King Alexander in Marseille in 1934. Following Alexander's assassination, the Ustaše movement's seniormost leaders, including Pavelić, were tried in absentia in both France and Yugoslavia and sentenced to death. Both evaded capture because they were granted asylum by Mussolini.

=== Axis invasion of Yugoslavia ===
Following the Anschluss of March 1938, during which Germany annexed Austria, Yugoslavia came to share its northwestern border with Germany and fell under increasing pressure as most of its neighbours aligned themselves with the Axis powers. In April 1939, Italy invaded and occupied Albania, thereby establishing a second land border with Yugoslavia. At the outbreak of World War II in September 1939, the Royal Yugoslav Government declared its neutrality. Between September and November 1940, Hungary and Romania joined the Tripartite Pact, aligning themselves with the Axis, and Italy invaded Greece. Yugoslavia was by then almost completely surrounded by the Axis powers and their satellites, and its neutral stance toward the war became strained. In late February 1941, Bulgaria joined the Pact. The following day, German troops entered Bulgaria from Romania, closing the ring around Yugoslavia.

Intending to secure his southern flank for the impending attack on the Soviet Union, German dictator Adolf Hitler began placing heavy pressure on Yugoslavia to join the Axis. On 25 March 1941, after some delay, the Royal Yugoslav Government signed the Pact. Two days later, a group of pro-Western, Serbian nationalist Royal Yugoslav Air Force officers deposed the country's regent, Prince Paul, in a bloodless coup d'état. They declared his teenage nephew Peter of age to assume his royal duties, and brought to power an ostensible government of national unity led by the head of the Royal Yugoslav Air Force, General Dušan Simović. The coup enraged Hitler, who wished to irrevocably dismantle Yugoslavia, which he dubbed a "Versailles construct". He immediately ordered the country's invasion, which commenced on 6 April.

=== Creation of the Independent State of Croatia ===
A map depicting the occupation and partition of Yugoslavia, 1941–1943

Yugoslavia was quickly overwhelmed by the combined strength of the Axis powers and surrendered in less than two weeks. The government and royal family went into exile, and the country was occupied and dismembered by its neighbours. Serbia was reduced to its pre-Balkan War borders and directly occupied by Germany. Serb-inhabited territories west of the Drina River were incorporated into the Axis puppet state known as the Independent State of Croatia (Croatian: Nezavisna država Hrvatska; NDH), which included most of modern-day Croatia, all of modern-day Bosnia and Herzegovina, and parts of modern-day Serbia. (Note: The NDH was divided into German and Italian areas of influence. The Italian area of influence was divided into three operational zones. Zone I, which consisted of the coastal and island area surrounding the cities of Zadar, Šibenik, Trogir and Split, was directly annexed by Italy. Zone II was consigned to the NDH. It encompassed much of Dalmatia and the Dalmatian Hinterland. Zone III, also allotted to the NDH, extended as far as western and central Bosnia, a sliver of eastern Bosnia, and all of Herzegovina.) The establishment of the NDH was announced over the radio by Slavko Kvaternik, a former Austro-Hungarian Army officer who had been in contact with Croatian nationalists abroad, on 10 April.

Pavelić entered the NDH on 13 April and reached its capital Zagreb two days later. The same day, Germany and Italy extended diplomatic recognition to the NDH. Pavelić assumed control and bestowed himself the title Poglavnik ('leader'). At the time of its establishment, the NDH had a population of 6.5 million inhabitants, about half of whom were Croats. It was also inhabited by nearly two million Serbs, who constituted about one-third of its total population. Nevertheless, Serbs—along with others whom the Ustaše deemed "undesirable", such as Jews and Roma—were denied citizenship on the basis that they were not Aryans, and immediate measures were taken to expunge the presence of the Cyrillic alphabet from the public sphere. On 17 April, the Ustaše instituted the Legal Provision for the Defence of the People and State, a law legitimizing the establishment of concentration camps and the mass shooting of hostages in the NDH. Thirty concentration camps in total were established across the puppet state.

== History ==
=== Sisak I ===
The town of Sisak, near the confluence of the Sava and Kupa rivers, is located more than 48 kilometres (30 mi) southeast of Zagreb. During the war, Sisak hosted two sub-camps, which were initially jointly administered by the NDH authorities and the German Commissioner in Croatia (German: Deutscher Bevollmächtigter General in Kroatien). The first sub-camp, Sisak I, served as a transit camp for thousands of captured Serbs, Bosniaks, and Roma who were to be deported to perform forced labour in the Reich. Euphemistically referred to as a "transit camp for refugees" by its administrators, it was established on part of an abandoned factory, which was surrounded by barbed wire. The German authorities sent some of the able-bodied prisoners from Sisak I to the Sajmište concentration camp, directly across the border from German-occupied Belgrade. Other prisoners met various fates in different German camps, such as Augsburg, Auschwitz, Dachau, Mauthausen, and Salzgitter. Some were sent to German-run camps in occupied Norway.

Sisak I was expanded in 1942 with the construction of seven additional barracks. By the following year, it had a total capacity of 5,000. The German authorities ceded control over Sisak I to the NDH and the Ustaše in April 1944. The camp was eventually shut down in January 1945, with its remaining inmates dispatched to Jasenovac, the largest of the Ustaše camps.

=== Sisak II ===
==== Establishment ====
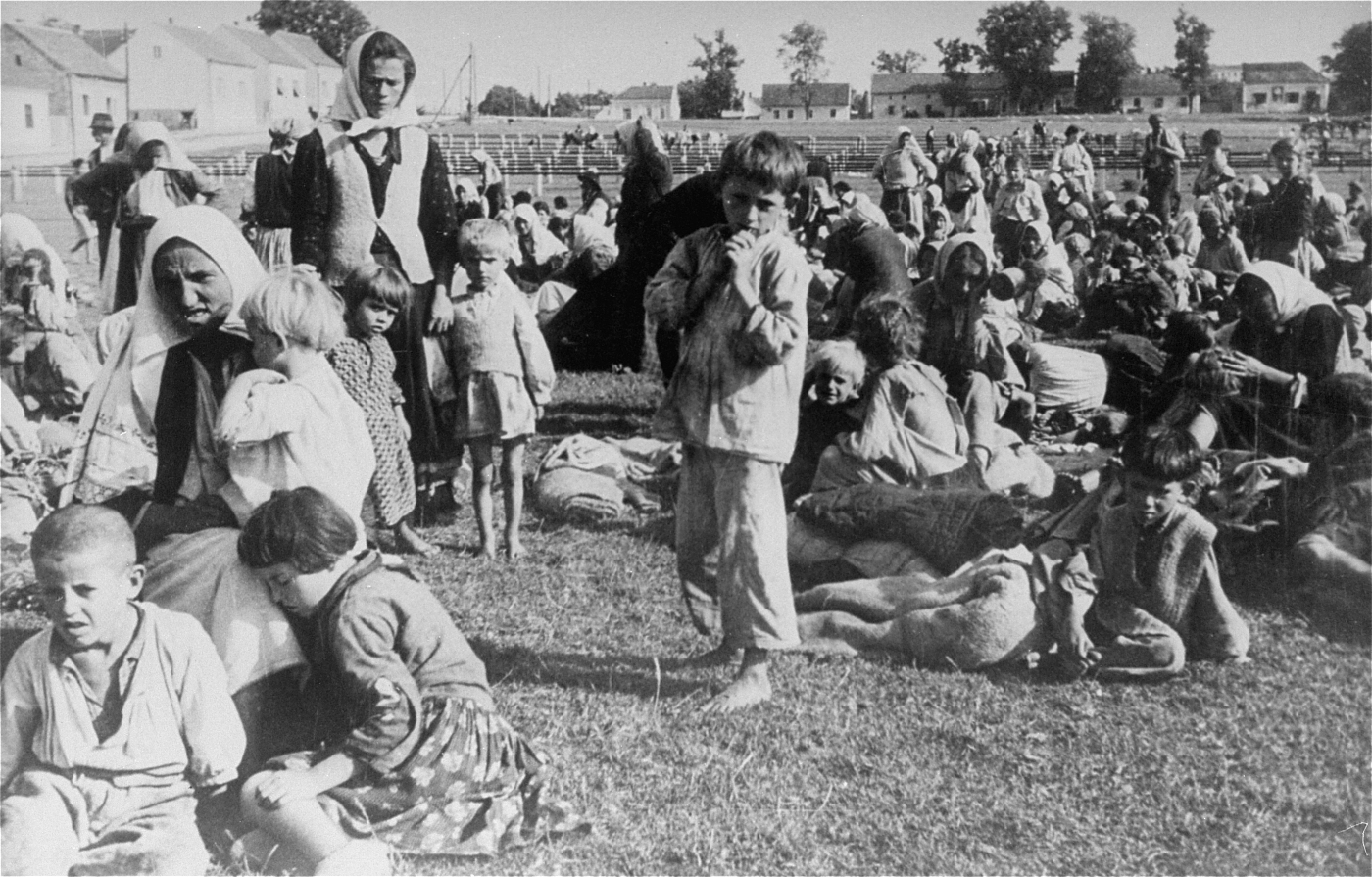
Serb women and children displaced following the Kozara Offensive, 1942

The second sub-camp, Sisak II, was reserved for those who were deemed unfit for forced labour. Its operators euphemistically referred to it as a "reception center for children and refugees" or the "shelter for children refugees". According to the historian Joseph Robert White, the first 1,200 children arrived from the Mlaka sub-camp on 29 July 1942, with subsequent transfers from Jasenovac V (Stara Gradiška) and Jastrebarsko taking place in August. According to the historians Paul R. Bartrop and Eve E. Grimm, Sisak II was officially established on 3 August 1942, following the Kozara Offensive (German: Operation West-Bosnien) against the Partisans in northwestern Bosnia. The first group of 906 children arrived at Sisak II on 3 August, according to Bartrop and Grimm, with an additional 650 children arriving the following day, and a third group of 1,272 on 6 August.

The Ustaše dispersed the children of Sisak II among the Sisters of Saint Vincent Convent, a site that formerly belonged to the Yugoslav Sokol recreational society, the Reis Saltworks and a primary school in the neighbourhood of Sisak Novi. Children under the age of three were detained in the convent, whereas those between the ages of four and five were confined to the saltworks. Sisak II was administered by the physician Antun Najžer. (Note: Also spelled Nadžer in some sources.) The commander of the camp guards was an individual with the surname Faget. Female Ustaša guards also took part in overseeing the camp. The intelligence agency of the Nazi Party and the Schutzstaffel (SS), the Sicherheitsdienst (SD), also sent a representative to Sisak, and German field gendarmes provided security around the two sub-camps and the adjacent railway.

==== Camp conditions and rescue efforts ====
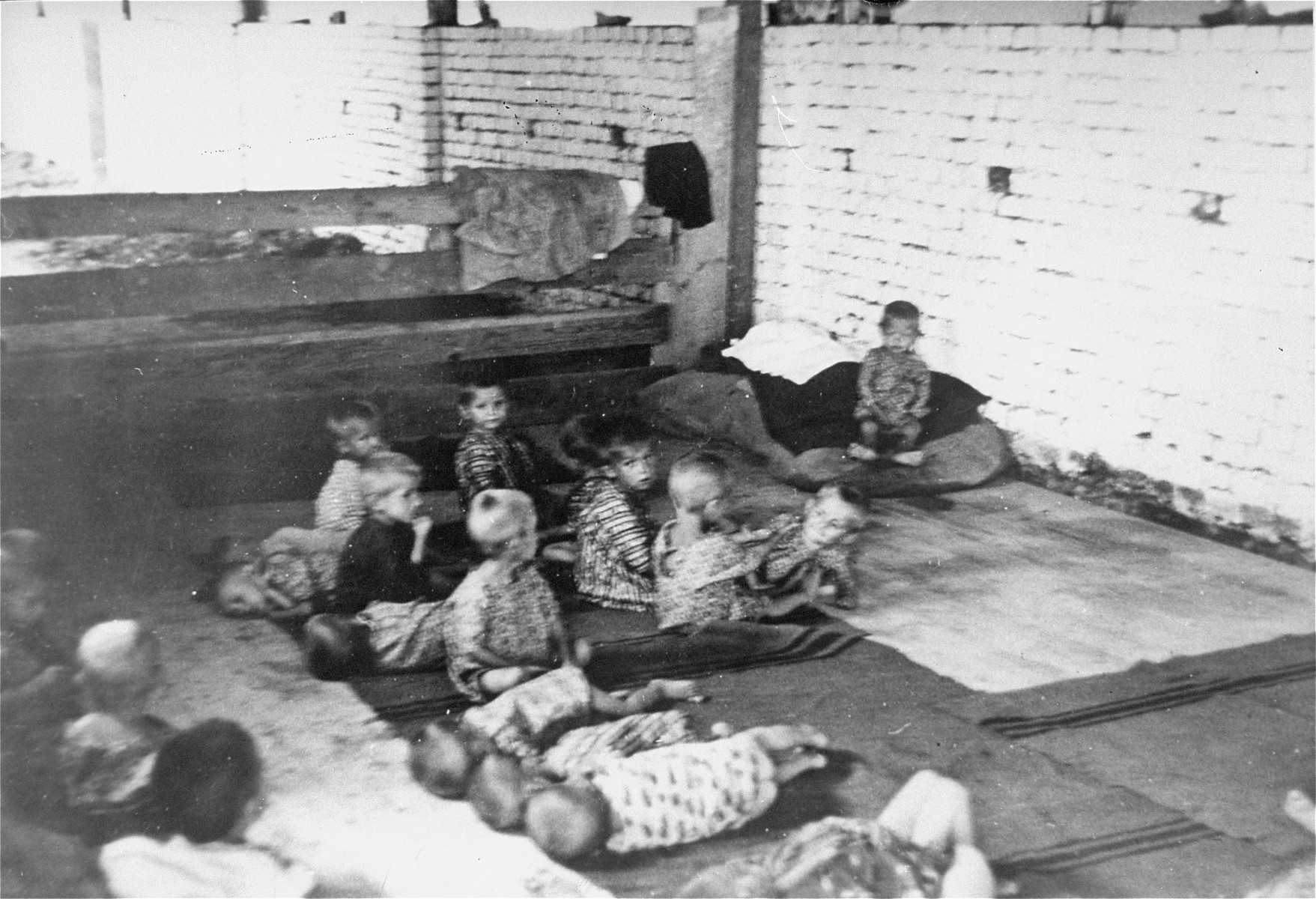
Child prisoners at Sisak II

Despite the efforts of humanitarians such as Diana Budisavljević and others, up to 40 children died at Sisak II on some days. Food parcels sent by the Red Cross never reached the children. By late September 1942, the camp held 4,720 children. Poor sanitary conditions and lack of care resulted in a very high mortality rate among the children. Children were made to sleep on the floor, and malnutrition and dysentery were rife. Of the 162 children admitted to the City Hospital for Infectious Diseases in Zagreb (Note: Now known as the Department of Infectious Diseases, Fran Mihaljević Hospital.) over the course of 1942, 145 died. Many had previously been interned at Sisak. In August and September 1942, it is estimated that Sisak II contained 3,971 child prisoners. Some of the camp's children were killed by being given lethal injections, personally administered by Najžer. Others were killed by being fed gruel laced with caustic soda, according to survivors. One former prisoner recalled how her sister "came down with a high fever and vomiting" and died after drinking poisoned milk.

NDH official Ante Dumbović authored a report in which he noted that the nuns tasked with looking after the children did not even know their names. This prompted Dumbović to place metal plates around the children's necks with their names inscribed. The poor living conditions at Sisak II shocked many observers, including Dumbović, as well as representatives of the Croatian Red Cross. Dumbović documented the conditions at Sisak with his camera, taking 755 photographs of the emaciated children, some dead or dying, and others lying naked on the floor. At the time of his inspection, Dumbović found that 956 children had died in the camp, of whom only 201 could be identified by name. Three women affiliated with the Croatian Red Cross—Jana Koch, Vera Luketić, and Luketić's mother, Dragica Habazin—visited Sisak II in September 1942 and interviewed Najžer. He denied that any of the inmates were suffering, apart from some internees at the primary school who were described as being "sick".

Many children were rescued by volunteers affiliated with the communist resistance, who found them jobs as domestic servants or farm workers. Rescuers often worked under code names in secret cells, coordinating their activities from farmhouses as well as the homes of local Croats. Approximately 2,200 children were resettled in Zagreb, while families from Sisak and surrounding villages sheltered 1,630 children rescued from the camp. In some cases, the children were released to their parents or close relatives, while many others were placed in foster care. Either because of the NDH policy of forced conversion or out of expedience, many were baptized into the Roman Catholic faith.

==== Dissolution ====
On 8 January 1943, Sisak II was shut down, and the remaining child prisoners were sent to Zagreb. Over the course of its existence, a total of 6,693 Serb, Jewish, and Roma children passed through Sisak II, according to Bartrop and Grimm. White places the number of child inmates at 7,000. According to Bartrop and Grimm, between 1,160 and 1,500 children perished at the camp, largely as a result of typhus. White estimates that between 1,200 and 1,600 children died from starvation, thirst, typhus and neglect.

== Legacy ==
The historian Jelena Subotić has referred to Sisak as a "uniquely monstrous" camp. The journalist Nikola Vukobratovic describes the treatment of children in Sisak II as "one of the greatest tragedies" in the town's history. On 8 September 1946, Najžer was convicted for his involvement in the atrocities that took place at Sisak II and sentenced to death by firing squad. In October 2014, Branko Lustig, a Holocaust survivor who produced the 1993 film Schindler's List, attended a ceremony commemorating the victims of the Sisak camp remarking: "We had a similar treatment [in Auschwitz] as children in [...] Sisak. [...] They had doctor Najžer, we had the infamous doctor Mengele."

After the war, parents who had survived being subjected to forced labour in the Reich returned to Yugoslavia and began searching for their children. Records kept by Budisavljević containing information about each child detained at Sisak were confiscated by the Department for People's Protection (Serbo-Croatian: Odeljenje za zaštitu naroda; OZNA), a Yugoslav state security agency founded in 1944. The information was kept from public view, preventing many families from reuniting. According to the historian Nataša Mataušić, most of the children adopted from camps such as Sisak never became aware of their biological families or the circumstances of their adoption. Others, such as camp survivor Božo Judaš, chose to continue identifying as Croats even after discovering their origins. "Some have asked me how come I identify as a Croat, although my biological parents were almost certainly Serbs," Judaš remarked. "It's quite simple: without my adoptive Croat father, I wouldn't be alive." Also among the children who passed through Sisak was Milja Toroman. She survived and later became the subject of an iconic war photograph titled Kozarčanka, which was widely seen as a symbol of the Partisan resistance in post-war Yugoslavia.

A memorial plaque was unveiled at the Reis Saltworks in 1954. In 1964, a sculpture by the visual artist and camp survivor Gabrijela Kolar, titled Unfinished Games (Serbo-Croatian: Nedovršene igre), was unveiled at one of the former camp sites, which had since been transformed into a public park and playground. "Such a concept was intentional," according to the academic Sanja Horvatinčić, "and was meant to console and give hope to the survivors of the war and to the visitors who are faced with the brutal history of the site." Unfinished Games depicts seven children whom Kolar had met while she herself was detained at the camp. A cemetery containing the graves of children who lost their lives at the camp was landscaped in 1974. Monuments commemorating the children who died, such as the ones at the Reis Saltworks and the Sisak Cultural Center, were destroyed in the early 1990s, during the Croatian War of Independence. Kolar's sculpture was spared, but has since fallen into a state of disrepair. The children's cemetery has experienced a similar fate. In post-independence Croatia, the Sisak camp's main building was transformed into a movie theatre and renamed the Crystal Cube of Cheerfulness (Croatian: Kristalna kocka vedrine).

In 2022, the Serbian Orthodox Church canonized the victims of Sisak II along with those of the Jastrebarsko children's camp as the "Saint children martyrs of Jastrebarsko and Sisak". In response, the Roman Catholic Archdiocese of Zagreb sent a letter of protest to Patriarch Porfirije, stating that "with regard to this matter, the Holy Synod of Bishops of the Serbian Orthodox Church has obviously accepted rhetoric and communist propaganda, full of untruths and manipulations, with which it is being attempted to blame innocent people for the alleged torture and murder of children, thousands of whom, owing to the love and care of Croatian Catholics, were saved from death and survived the difficult wartime conditions."

== See also ==
- Genocide of Serbs in the Independent State of Croatia
- Jastrebarsko children's camp
