= Zagorje (disambiguation) =

Zagorje is a common South Slavic toponym meaning "[place] behind the hills". It may refer to:

== Places ==
- Zagori, a mountainous region in Epirus (Greece and Albania)

Bosnia and Herzegovina

- Zagorje (Posušje), a village in Bosnia and Herzegovina

Croatia

- Zagorje, Ogulin, a village in Karlovac County
- Zagorje, Krnjak, a village near Krnjak in Karlovac County
- Zagorje, Kršan, a village in Istria County
- Hrvatsko Zagorje ("Croatian Zagorje"), a region in northern Croatia
- Gornje Zagorje, a village near Ogulin
- Donje Zagorje, a village near Ogulin

Kosovo

- Zogaj-Zagorje, a village in Kosovo

Montenegro

- Zagorje, Berane Municipality

Slovenia

- Municipality of Zagorje ob Savi, a municipality in Slovenia
  - Zagorje ob Savi, the administrative centre
- Zagorje, Pivka, a village in Slovenia
- Zagorje, Kozje, a village in Slovenia
- Zagorje, Sveti Tomaž, a village in Slovenia

== Other uses ==
- NK Zagorje, a Slovenian football club

== See also ==
- Krapina-Zagorje County, in Croatia
- Zagore (disambiguation)
- Zagora (disambiguation)
- Zagori (disambiguation)
- Záhorie, a region in Slovakia
