= Ribarići =

Ribarići may refer to:

- Ribarići, Ilijaš, a village in Bosnia and Herzegovina
- Ribarići, Karlovac County, a village in Croatia
- Ribarići, Istria County, a village in Croatia

== See also ==
- Ribarice
- Ribari (disambiguation)
