= Ribari =

Ribari may refer to:

- Ribari, Šabac, a village in Šumadija, Serbia
- Ribari, Brus, a village in Rasina District, Serbia
- Ribari, Konjic, a village near Konjic, Bosnia and Herzegovina
- Ribari, Croatia, a village near Karlovac, Croatia

== See also ==
- Ribare (disambiguation)
- Ribarice
- Ribariće
- Ribarići (disambiguation)
