= Hreljin Ogulinski =

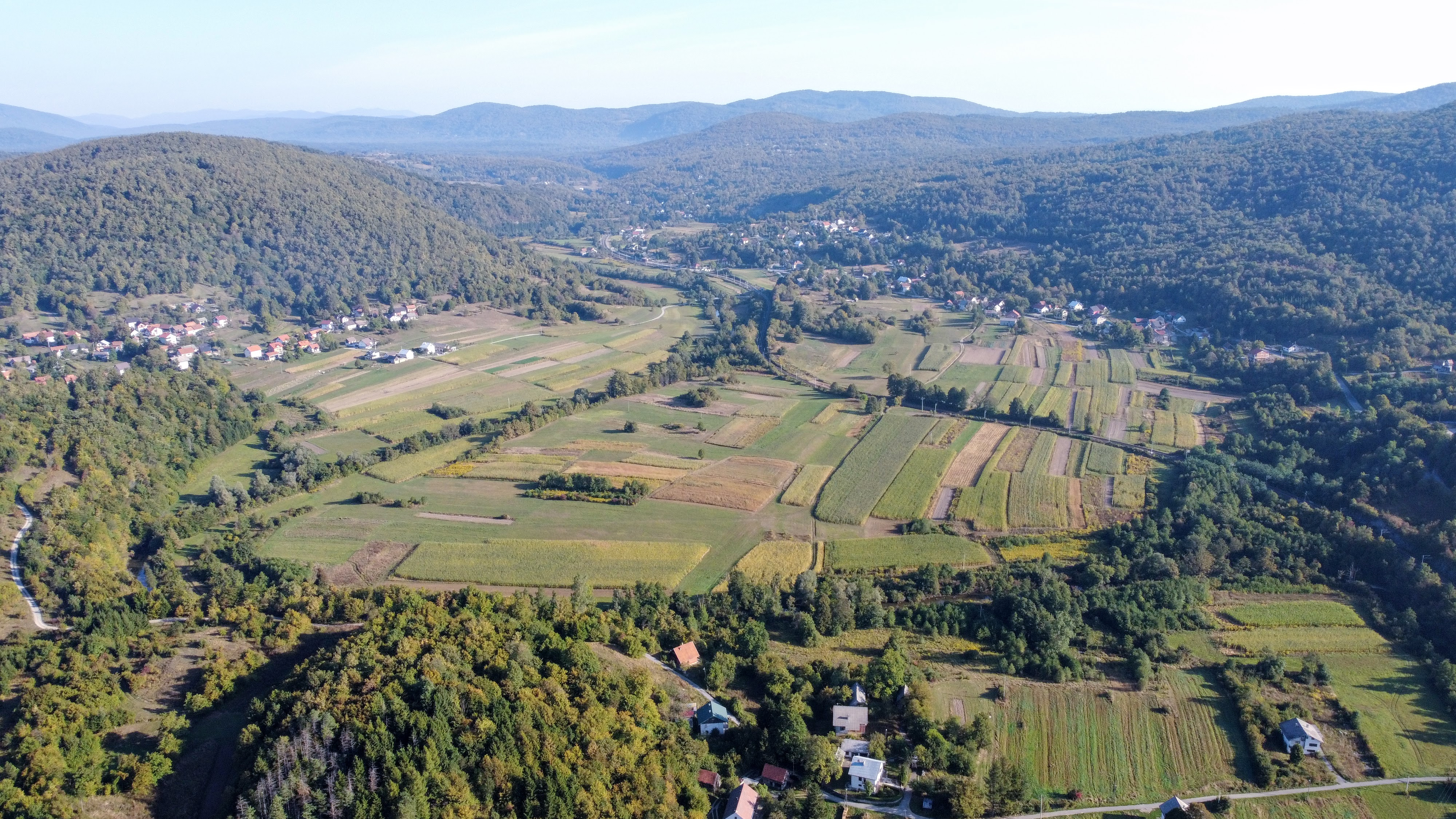
- Hreljin Ogulinski in 2021

- Location within Croatia
- Coordinates: 45°18′N 15°11′E
- Country: Croatia
- County: Karlovac
- City: Ogulin

Area
  - Total: 17.1 km^{2} (6.6 sq mi)

Population (2021)
  - Total: 446
  - Density: 26.1/km^{2} (67.6/sq mi)
- Time zone: UTC+1 (CET)
  - Summer (DST): UTC+2 (CEST)

Hreljin Ogulinski is a village in Karlovac County, Croatia, and is a suburb of Ogulin.

The village is situated on either side of the Dobra River, and consists of several small hamlets. A railroad and the Croatian D42 road pass through Hreljin Ogulinski.

== History ==
At 10:00 on 24 February 1942, a group of about 300 "Communists" with automatic weapons arrived in the area of Ogulin and above Hreljin and Kučaj. Until 14:00, they blocked the road to Ogulin, after which they retreated to Gomirje. For 3–4 days they appeared from time to time in the area of Ogulin, Hreljin, Vrbovsko and Gomirje, then Gornje Dubrave, Gomirje and Jasenak.

On 11 June, about 20 Partisans attacked Hreljin, but the attack was repelled.

In 2000, the Saint Anthony of Padua Church was constructed.

== Demographics ==
According to the 2001 Census, there were 595 residents, with 180 family households.

In 1835, Hreljin belonged to Ogulin. There were 22 houses, with a population of 215. Its residents were mostly Catholic, but 40 were Orthodox.

== Bibliography ==
- Trgo, Fabijan, ed. (1964). Zbornik dokumenata i podataka o Narodno-oslobodilačkom ratu Jugoslovenskih naroda. Vol. V, 32.
