= Zahora =

Zahora may refer to:

- Zahora (plant), a genus of flowering plants.
- Zahora, modern Spanish rendition for suḥūr, a pre-fasting meal Muslims have before Fajr during Ramaḍān.
- Zahora, a rural settlement within Barbate municipality, province of Cádiz, Andalucía autonomous region, Spain.
- Zahora, Lviv Oblast, a village in Zolochiv Raion, Lviv Oblast, Ukraine.
- Zahora, Rivne Oblast, a village in Rivne Raion, Rivne Oblast, Ukraine.
- Dario Zahora, Croatian football player.

== See also ==
- Zohara
- Zagora (disambiguation)
