= Ogulin =

- Town
- Grad Ogulin; Town of Ogulin
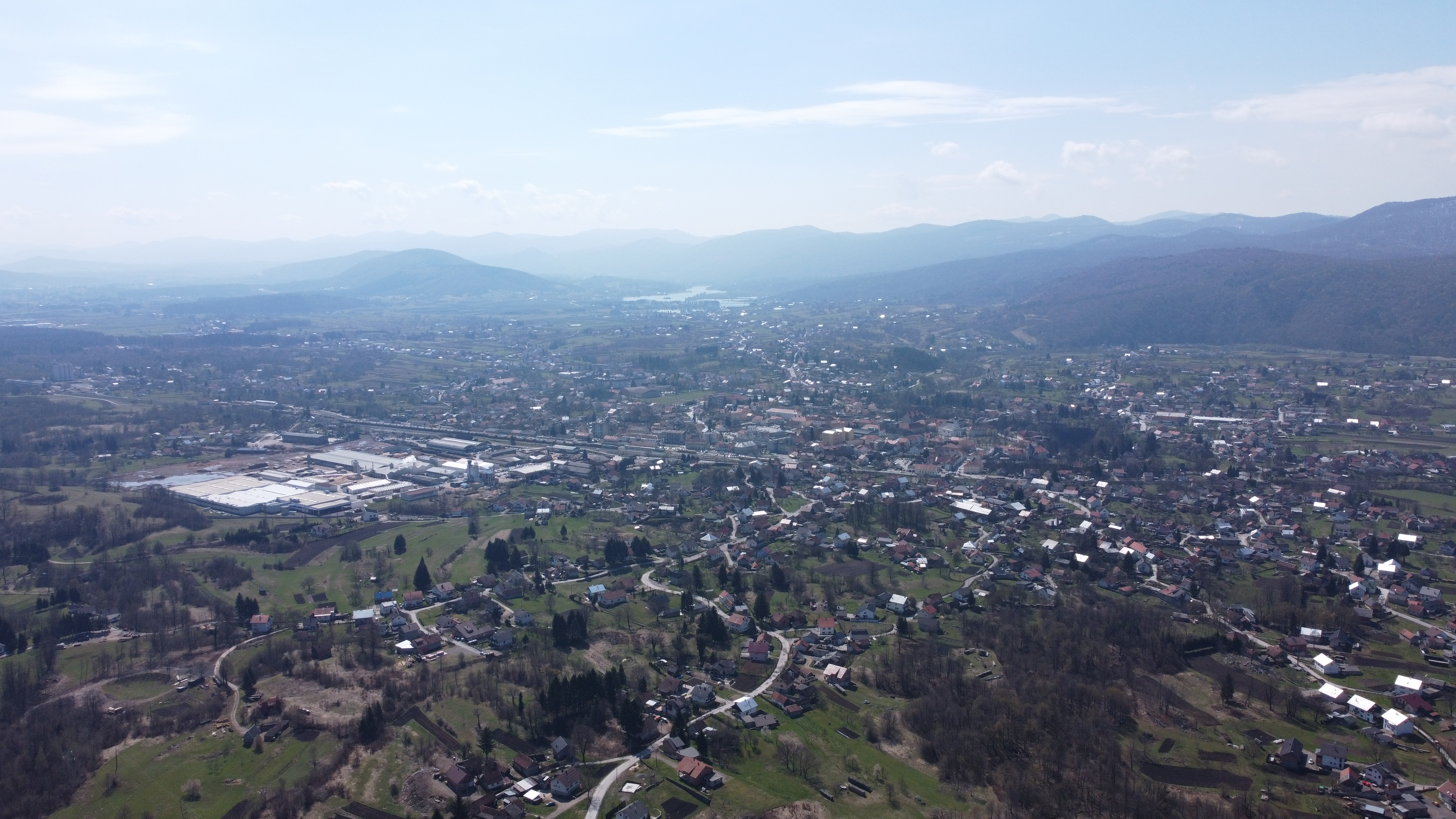
- Aerial view of Ogulin and Klek mountain
- Interactive map of Ogulin
- Location of Ogulin in Croatia
- Coordinates: 45.26686°N 15.225076°E
- Country: Croatia
- Region: Central Croatia (Ogulin-Plaški Valley)
- County: Karlovac County

Government
  - Mayor: Dalibor Domitrović (SDP)
  - City Council: 17 members: • SDP (9); • HDZ, HSP, HSLS, HSU (6), DSS (1), SDSS (1)

Area
  - Town: 538.1 km^{2} (207.8 sq mi)
  - Urban: 38.4 km^{2} (14.8 sq mi)
- Elevation: 323 m (1,060 ft)

Population (2021)
  - Town: 12,246
  - Density: 22.76/km^{2} (58.94/sq mi)
  - Urban: 7,374
  - Urban density: 192/km^{2} (497/sq mi)
- Time zone: UTC+1 (Central European Time)
- Website: ogulin.hr

Ogulin (Croatian pronunciation: [ôɡulin]) is a town in central Croatia, in Karlovac County. It has a population of 7,389 (2021) (it was 8,216 in 2011), and a total municipal population of 12,251 (2021). Ogulin is known for its historic stone castle, known as Kula, and the nearby mountain of Klek.

== Toponymy ==
There are several proposed etymologies for the name of Ogulin. Firstly that the surrounding woods needed to be cleared for a better defence of the town, so Ogulin received its name because of the resulting bare area ("ogolio" in Croatian) around it. There were a lot of lime-trees along the road from Ogulin towards Oštarije, and the people used to peel the bark, in order to get bass. It is suggested that Ogulin got its name from the verb to peel ("guliti" in Croatian). Neither proposal is historically confirmed.

== History ==
Ogulin's history dates back to the fifteenth century, when it struggled against the Ottoman Turks. The exact timing of the building of the Ogulin tower has not been established. However, a document issued by Bernardin Frankopan in his town of Modruš at around 1500 AD marked off the boundaries of new castle between Modruš and Vitunj, and this is, at the same time, the first historical mention of Ogulin. Ogulin is known for the legend of Đula (also Zuleika or Zula) who threw herself into the abyss of the River Dobra because of an unhappy love affair. In the sixteenth century, it became a military stronghold against the Ottomans.

=== Military Frontier ===
In the 16th century, Ogulin became a part of the Austrian Military Frontier, under the Ogulin Capitanate. Known captains include:

1. Gašpar I Frankopan (1580)
2. Hans Gall von Gallenstein (1581)
3. Juraj IV Frankopan (1581)
4. Jakob Gall von Gallenstein (1586–1592)
5. Hans Gall von Gallenstein (1593)
6. Sigismund Kanischer/Kanižar (1599)
7. Sigismund Gusić (1602)
8. Hans Gall von Gallenstein (1603, 1609–1611)
9. Martin Gall von Gallenstein (Note: A 15 year old youth, the son of Hans Gall.) (1611)
10. Thadialonich
11. Vuk II Krsto Frankopan (1611)
12. Gašpar II Frankopan (1622)
13. Herbard X von Auersperg (1653)
14. Petar IV Zrinski (1658)
15. Ivan Antun Zrinski (1665)
16. Stjepan Vojnović (1671)
17. Johann Adam von Purgstall (1687)
18. Petar de Bonazza (1716)
19. Sigfried Seethal (1725)
20. Petar Paval Bonaza (1725–1732)
21. Franjo Josip Benzoni (1735)
22. Dillis (1746)
23. Leopold Eugen von Scherzer (1750)
24. Max. Gusić (1750)
25. Anton Losy von Losenau (1753)
26. Petzinger (1760)
27. Barth. Pasee (1767)
28. Casim. Mueller (1773)
29. Georg Silly (1778)
30. Peharnik von Hotkovich (1786)
31. Mathias Rukavina von Bonyograd (1789)
32. Scherz (1795)
33. Karl von Lezzeny (1798)
34. Johann Branovacski (1804)
35. Ignaz Csivich von Rohr (1809)
36. Mihajlo Ogrizović (1814)
37. Anton Turina (1817)
38. Georg. Rukavina von Vidovgrad (1818)
39. Johann von Maina (1829)
40. August von Turski (1830)
41. Gen. Major (1834)
42. Johann Schnekel von Trebersburg (1835)

For a brief time, between 1809 and 1813, Ogulin was a part of the Illyrian Provinces.

In August 1876, a savings bank opened in Ogulin. Its first year of investment resulted in 10,423 forint, with a minimum interest rate of 6%. The nearest savings banks were in Karlovac (opened August 1872), Kraljevica (Note: Primorska štediona) (opened March 1873, bankrupt 1878), Senj (opened March 1873) and Bakar (opened July 1876). The nearest commercial banks were in Zagreb (the Croatian Discount Bank, founded November 1868, and the Zagreb Commercial Bank, founded March 1873). Credit unions existed in Karlovac (Note: Karlovačka pomoćnica (opened 1872), Štedovni i predujmovni konzorcij I. obćega činovničkoga družtva austro-ugar. monarkije u Karlovcu (opened 1875)) and Jastrebarsko (opened 1875). (Note: Jastrebarska pomoćnica)

=== Civil Hungary ===
In the late 19th century, a Matica hrvatska branch opened in Ogulin, with 55 members in 1891.

Until 1918, Ogulin was part of the Austrian monarchy (Kingdom of Croatia-Slavonia, Modruš-Rijeka County, after the compromise of 1867), in the Croatian Military Frontier. It was administered by the Oguliner Grenz-Infanterie-Regiment N°III before 1881.

=== WWII ===
During WWII, 2743 people were killed in the kotar of Ogulin, of which 1592 by Croats, 671 by Italians, 438 by Germans and 41 by Serbs.

==== 1941 ====
On 11 April 1941, the new NDH authorities made Lovro Sušić administrator of the kotar of Ogulin.

It was in Ogulin that Ante Pavelić gave his first speech on 13 April 1941 as he travelled to Zagreb. He was greeted by priest Ivan Mikan, who served in Ogulin from 1937 until his death in 1943, and wore a cylindrical hat for the occasion, believing the arrival of Pavelić would be solemn only to feel silly when it wasn't. Two or three hymns were sung and then Pavelić gave his speech, full of threats against the Serbs and praise for the Italians who brought him there (no Germans were in attendance).

In Ogulin and its environs, the early arrests in May mostly targeted JRZ members like Dragan Žagrović and Pero Piškur, as well as its sympathisers, including Joso Kušer, Laslo Havelić and Roko Kučinić. Arrests did not begin in earnest until May. Other prominent JRZ members in Ogulin at the time included Vlado Bosnić, Đuro Tatalović and Stevan Čurčić.

On 8 May 1941, an article titled "Order and work in Ogulin" (Croatian: Red i rad u Ogulinu) was published in Hrvatski narod, describing the taking down of various signs put in place by the Kingdom of Yugoslavia, in place of which Croatian flags were placed. It described the process of "cleansing" Ogulin of Serbs loyal to the House of Karađorđević.

On 3 June, an Ustaša ralley with over 12,000 in attendance was held at Ogulin. Priest Mikan presided over the mass, followed by a speech from Jozo Dumandžić.

On 9 June, Lovro Sušić, by that time Minister of People's Economy, wrote to in Hrvatski narod, "We don't want a bloody cleansing," (Croatian: Nećemo krvavog čišćenja) but "the Serbs must move" (Croatian: Srbi moraju seliti).

On 30 June and 16 July, lists of Serbian and Jewish workers on the territory of the Ogulin kotar who had not achieved the right to a pension were made. From these lists, it is apparent that state workers of Serb ethnicity numbered 144 at the time, the largest portion of which worked in the railway industry, and the remainder in schools, the kotar court, the kotar itself, the općina, or the forestry service.

On 1 July, Pavelić founded the Velika župa Modruš with its seat in Ogulin, by merging Ogulin with Slunj, Vrbovsko and Delnice.

In late June or early July, a Serbian Orthodox priest in Ogulin was arrested. In early July, he had not yet been sent away. As of a 15 July document, all he had been sent to a concentration camp.

A 2 July order was made for all Velike župe, including that of Modruš (with seat in Ogulin), to make room for 2500 Slovenes each, who were to occupy the homes of 2500 Serbs, to be deported to the GMS, prioritising businessmen and merchants. Ogulin itself was to accommodate 300 Slovenes. As of mid-July, there were not enough empty Serb homes to accommodate the exchange.

A new wave of arrests began in July. On 5 July, Dušan Ivošević was arrested and the court in Zagreb sentenced him to 10 years of imprisonment for saying the murder of Josip Mravunac that preceded the Blagaj massacre was perpetrated by the Ustaše and not the Četnici, as had been formally announced to the public. On 8 July, he was placed in detention in Ogulin, and shortly after that 27 KPJ members, of which 25 were Croats, were arrested in Ogulin.

Around July 8, the Ogulin kotar began the process of deporting the families to the Sisak concentration camp on a list of 55 people marked for moving to make room for Slovene arrivals, from Jasenak, Josipdol, Munjava, Trojvrh and Vajin Vrh. The deportations were never carried out thanks to Pavelić interrupting the process, but thanks to the mass arrests scaring the Serbs off, none of the attempted arrests in this area succeeded, since none of the named could be found at their house. So great was the fear that women would flee at the sound of a suspicious car. (Note: "Zbog učestalih zločina žene budno paze na svaki auto i čim opaze nekakav dolazak sumnjivog automobila, odmah bježe.") So the kotarski predstojnik of Ogulin proposed to wait 8 to 10 days until the atmosphere was calmer. Pavelić himself stopped the process, so that deportations of Serbs from the NDH became rare after August 25, and they were entirely stopped on 22 September, thanks to the military implications for the Wehrmacht of the Drvar uprising.

On 30 July, many Serbs from Ogulin and the surrounding villages were arrested at the market in Ogulin, having come there to sell. Beginning with the next market on 6 August, the Serbs stopped coming out of fear that it would happen a third time, the first having been in May. The second uncle of Milka Bunjevac, a Vučinić with a prominent job at the railway station, was to be arrested that day, but he was warned by an Ustaša that he should flee "wherever he knows" (Croatian: kamo god zna) because that night he would be arrested. Vučinić then boarded a train from Ogulin to Gomirje, arriving at his sister's house around midnight and then fleeing to the GMS two or three days later.

In August 1941, the Minister of Sport and Mountaineering of the NDH, Miško Zebić, named Oskar Vičević as the state povjerenik of the HPD "Klek", and designated as the chapter's advisory board: Mijo Hačko, Ivan Stipetić, Zvonko Pohorčić, Štefica Abramović, Pero Špehar, Mirko Kolić. The HPD "Klek" was renamed Hrvatsko planinarsko društvo u Ogulinu in March 1942.

==== 1942 ====
At 17:00 on 10 June, 3 Ogulin residents, Joso Jurašić, Ivan Oskoruš and Ivica Miškulin, were cutting wood on the Čokolka hill near Ogulin when they encountered 4 Partisans in civilian uniform but Partisan caps, who commanded them to raise their hands in the air, asking them if they were Ustaše. When they replied that they weren't, they told Jurašić to come with them because he had been an Ustaša earlier, letting the other two go.

On the 13th, Partisans confiscated 18 head of large and 22 of small livestock from a meadow in the immediate vicinity of Ogulin.

During the Battle of Tržić on 19–23 June 1942, the Domobran commander Ivan Stipac was wounded in the leg and captured by Partisans of the Kordun Partisan Detachment, who took him to Tobolić.

At 10:00 on 24 June, a group of 150 Italian soldiers armed with rifles and machine guns entered the forest on Kobiljak hill to cut firewood, but were attacked by Partisans. A battle ensued, in which 4 Italians and 5 of their donkeys were killed, 6 were wounded, 20 captured and 20 captured but released completely naked. One Partisan was killed and one captured and taken to Ogulin for questioning.

When the German and Italian Zones of Influence were revised on 24 June 1942, Ogulin fell in Zone II, administered civilly by Croatia but militarily by Italy.

On 2–3 July, the Italian garrison in Ogulin repelled a Partisan attack on Ogulin itself, following which the Partisans retreated to Klek.

On 14 September, Italian troops began taking away to Italy certain individuals in Ogulin with family members in the rebellion.

At 3:00 on the 17th, a group of about 250 Partisans attacked the village of Boršt, repelled by the Domobrani stationed in the village without losses.

== Geography ==
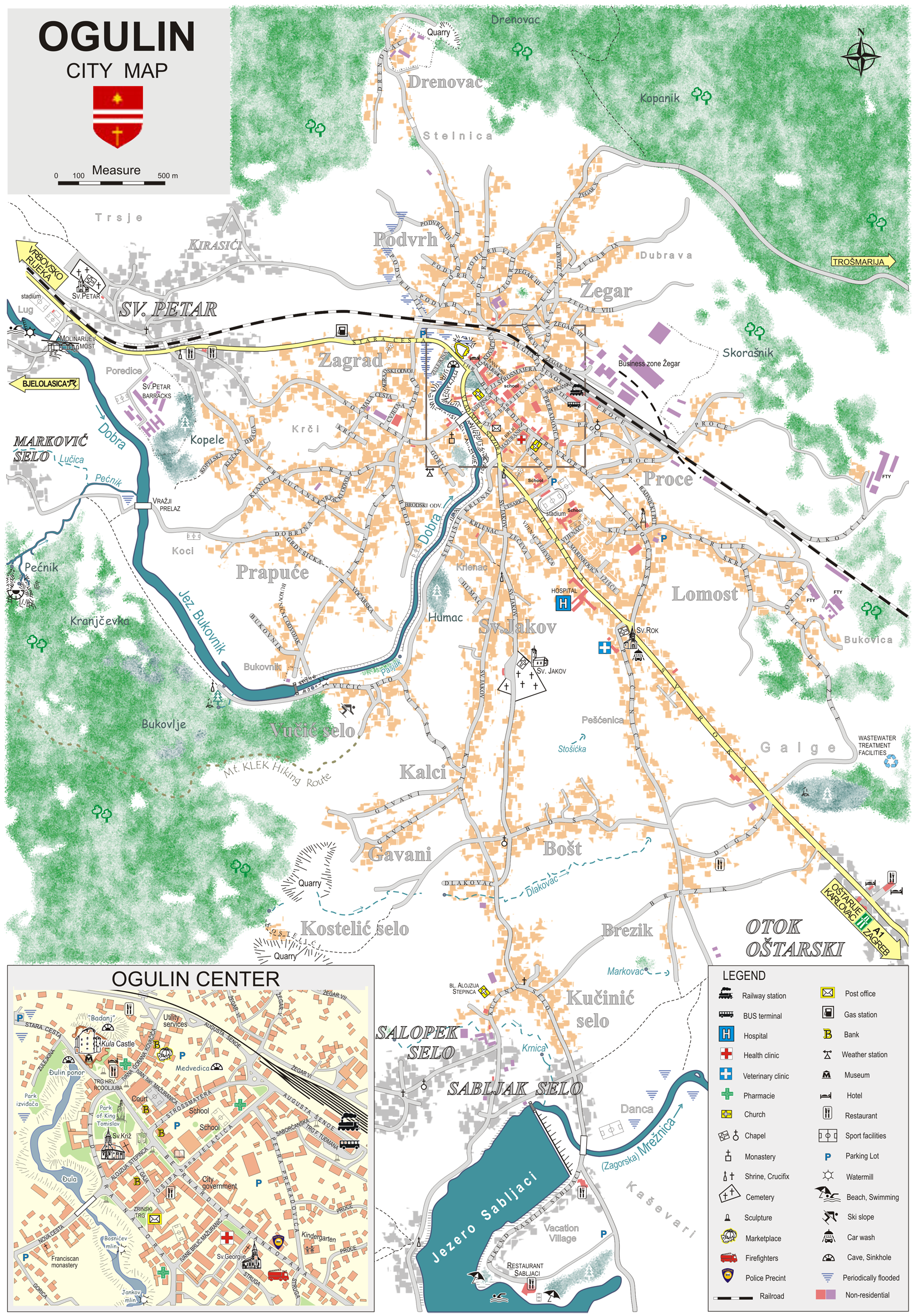
City map of Ogulin

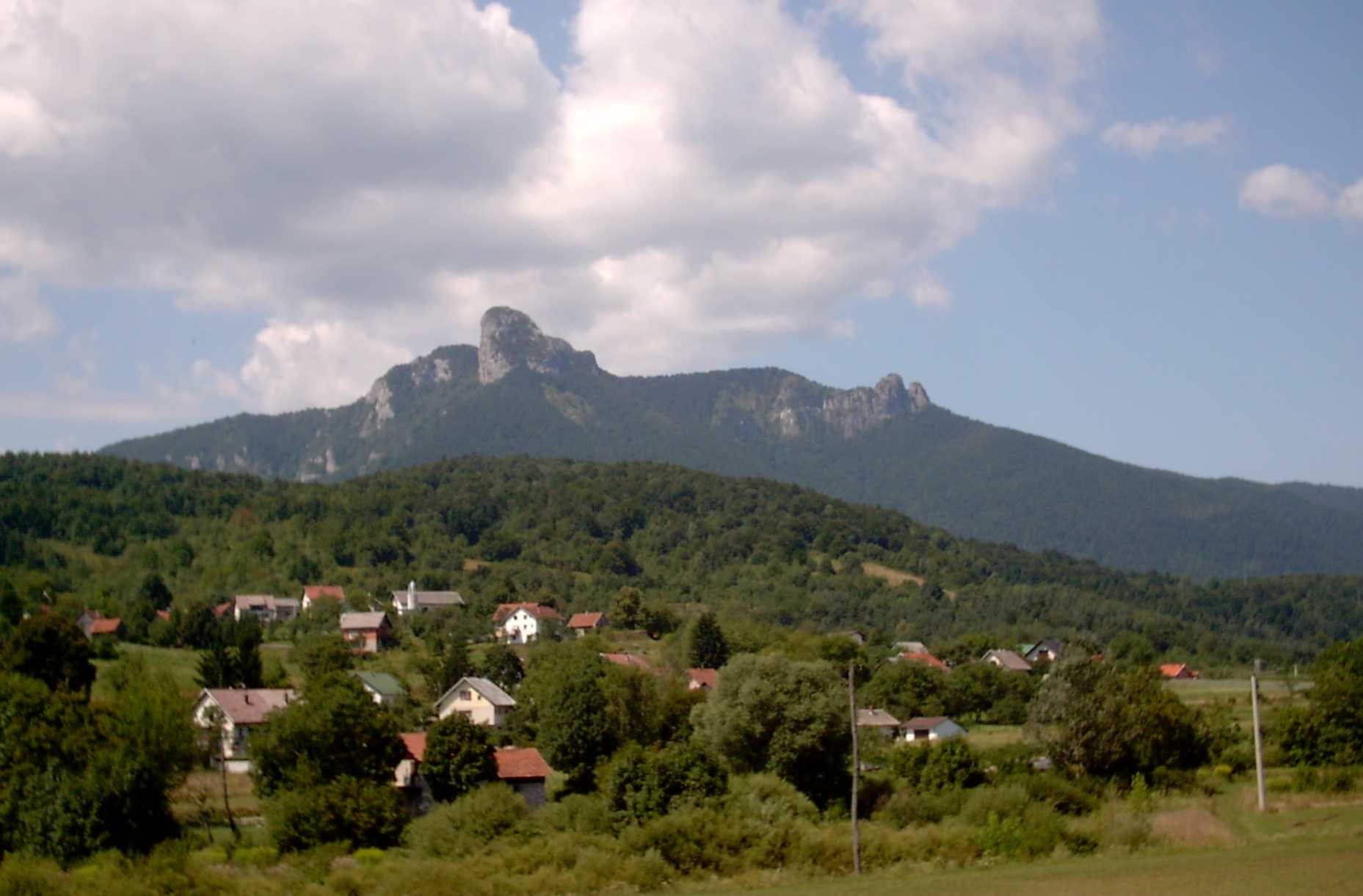
Klek mountain

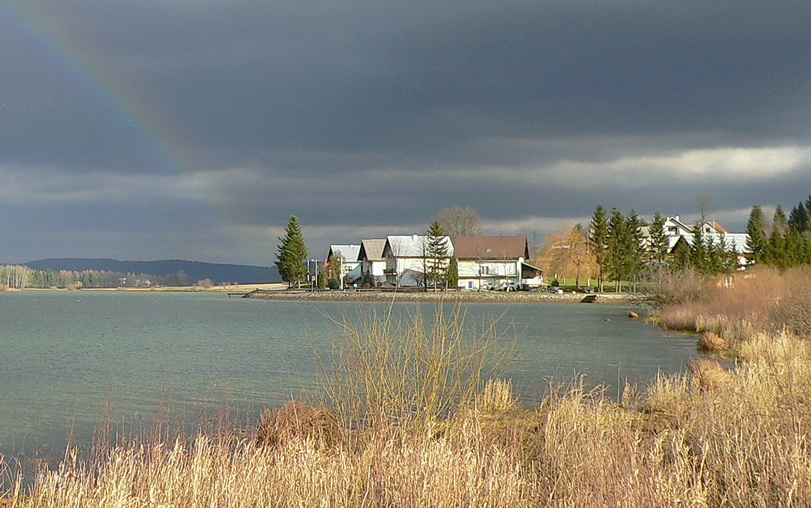
Sabljaci lake near Ogulin

The town of Ogulin is situated in the very centre of mainland Croatia, between Zagreb and Rijeka. It was founded in a large valley formed by two rivers: the Dobra and Zagorska Mrežnica. The administrative constitution of the town of Ogulin covers the area of 543.32 km^{2}, and has about 14,000 inhabitants according to 2011 census.

This is a kind of transitional micro-region neighbouring the larger regions of Croatia - Gorski Kotar, Lika, Kordun and Gornje Pokuplje. The Ogulin-Modruš valley is the northern section of the Ogulin-Plaški valley, which finishes towards the south where the Modruš hills pass into the second largest field of the area under Kapela-Plaški Polje. This comprises a completed geographical whole border on the western side by the mountain massif of Velika Kapela dominated by Klek (1181 m). Its eastern edges are bordered by the mounts of Krpel (511 m (1,677 ft)), Brezovica (565 m (1,854 ft)) and Hum (863 m (2,831 ft)). The valley then passes to the hilly are dominated by Klekinja (504 m (1,654 ft)) and Trojvrh (599 m (1,965 ft)). This valley is also called Ogulin's Plain (in Croatian: Ogulinsko Polje). This is the fifth largest karst valley in Croatia (60 km^{2} (23 sq mi)), and it lies 320 metres (1,050 feet) above sea level. Its elongated form lies in the direction northwest-southeast, and it is 16 km (10 mi) long (Ogulin-Trojvrh) and 9 km (6 mi) wide (Desmerice-Skradnik). The Dobra River runs through and disappears in the center of the town.

Approximately three kilometers south of the town centre is an artificial lake Sabljaci, formed with the purpose of accumulating water from the Zagorska Mrežnica river, and for the sake of generating electricity in the Hydroelectric power plant Gojak. The lake is connected with the town's other artificial lake, lake Bukovnik, via a tunnel. Lake Bukovnik is approximately one kilometer away from lake Sabljaci, and is connected to the hydroelectric power plant Gojak also with a tunnel, approximately 10 km long. The surface area of lake Sabljaci is around 170 ha, which makes it the 11th Croatian lake when compared by size. The lake contains many kinds of fish species, and it is also used for swimming and various water sports.

- Elevation: 323 m (1060 ft) above sea level
- Latitude: 45° 15' 59"
- Longitude: 15° 13' 44"

=== Speleology ===
Ogulin's Đulin ponor is an extensive cave system underneath the city. A botanical expedition was conducted at its mouth on 30 September 1900 by Antun Heinz and his assistant.

== Climate ==
Since records began in 1949, the highest temperature recorded at the local weather station at an elevation of 328 metres (1,076 ft) was 39.5 °C (103.1 °F), on 5 July 1950. The coldest temperature was −28.5 °C (−19.3 °F), on 17 February 1956.

A weather station exists there at an elevation of 324 metres (1,063 ft). The minimum recorded temperature for the winter of 2024–2025 was −10.8 °C (12.6 °F), on February 20.

Climate data for Ogulin (1971–2000, extremes 1949–2017)
Month	Jan	Feb	Mar	Apr	May	Jun	Jul	Aug	Sep	Oct	Nov	Dec	Year
Record high °C (°F)	19.8 (67.6)	21.2 (70.2)	25.4 (77.7)	28.1 (82.6)	32.4 (90.3)	35.6 (96.1)	39.5 (103.1)	39.5 (103.1)	33.2 (91.8)	28.7 (83.7)	24.7 (76.5)	20.9 (69.6)	39.5 (103.1)
Mean daily maximum °C (°F)	4.3 (39.7)	6.2 (43.2)	10.5 (50.9)	14.6 (58.3)	19.8 (67.6)	23.0 (73.4)	25.4 (77.7)	25.2 (77.4)	21.0 (69.8)	15.2 (59.4)	9.2 (48.6)	5.5 (41.9)	15.0 (59.0)
Daily mean °C (°F)	0.5 (32.9)	1.7 (35.1)	5.5 (41.9)	9.5 (49.1)	14.4 (57.9)	17.6 (63.7)	19.5 (67.1)	18.8 (65.8)	15.0 (59.0)	10.1 (50.2)	5.0 (41.0)	1.7 (35.1)	9.9 (49.8)
Mean daily minimum °C (°F)	−3.1 (26.4)	−2.2 (28.0)	1.0 (33.8)	4.7 (40.5)	9.0 (48.2)	12.0 (53.6)	13.5 (56.3)	13.3 (55.9)	10.1 (50.2)	6.1 (43.0)	1.4 (34.5)	−1.8 (28.8)	5.3 (41.5)
Record low °C (°F)	−26.2 (−15.2)	−28.5 (−19.3)	−20.4 (−4.7)	−8.8 (16.2)	−2.9 (26.8)	1.6 (34.9)	4.3 (39.7)	2.4 (36.3)	−2.2 (28.0)	−5.7 (21.7)	−19.1 (−2.4)	−22.3 (−8.1)	−28.5 (−19.3)
Average precipitation mm (inches)	95.5 (3.76)	101.0 (3.98)	109.1 (4.30)	126.9 (5.00)	117.3 (4.62)	133.7 (5.26)	111.7 (4.40)	115.4 (4.54)	143.1 (5.63)	159.6 (6.28)	168.7 (6.64)	142.8 (5.62)	1,524.8 (60.03)
Average precipitation days (≥ 0.1 mm)	15.0	13.0	13.4	15.0	14.2	14.6	11.1	10.5	11.5	14.5	15.0	15.1	162.9
Average snowy days (≥ 1.0 cm)	16.9	14.6	8.1	1.9	0.1	0.0	0.0	0.0	0.0	0.2	5.9	15.3	63.0
Average relative humidity (%)	82.3	78.1	72.5	70.1	70.8	72.1	72.3	75.5	79.7	82.0	83.6	83.8	76.9
Mean monthly sunshine hours	68.2	101.7	142.6	165.0	223.2	234.0	279.0	251.1	186.0	120.9	72.0	65.1	1,908.8
Source: Croatian Meteorological and Hydrological Service

=== Flora ===
Some of the more unusual species that have been found in Ogulin include Eryngium amethystinum and the xerophyte Asplenium ceterach, found there on a botanical expedition in 1900.

== Demographics ==
According to the 2011 census, Croats comprise 80.2% and Serbs 17.7% of the municipality population. Serbs form a majority in many villages, most of them are upland.

The settlements in the municipality are (as of 2021):

- Desmerice, population 231 ▼
- Donje Dubrave, population 152 ▼
- Donje Zagorje, population 198 ▼
- Drežnica, population 356 ▼
- Dujmić Selo, population 114 ▼
- Gornje Dubrave, population 63 ▼
- Gornje Zagorje, population 270 ▼
- Hreljin Ogulinski, population 446 ▼
- Jasenak, population 175 ▼
- Marković Selo, population 60 ▲
- Ogulin, population 7374 ▼
- Otok Oštarijski, population 344 ▼
- Ponikve, population 58 ▼
- Popovo Selo, population 43 ▼
- Potok Musulinski, population 84 ▼
- Puškarići, population 433 ▼
- Ribarići, population 285 ▼
- Sabljak Selo, population 252 ▼
- Salopek Selo, population 223 ▼
- Sveti Petar, population 613 ▼
- Trošmarija, population 91 ▼
- Turkovići Ogulinski, population 202 ▼
- Vitunj, population 77 ▼
- Zagorje, population 102 ▼
Town of Ogulin: Population trends 1857–2021
v

population	12927	14594	16154	18203	19172	19597	18542	20594	17488	18090	18315	17737	17012	16732	15054	13915	12246
	1857	1869	1880	1890	1900	1910	1921	1931	1948	1953	1961	1971	1981	1991	2001	2011	2021

Note:Formed from the old Ogulin općina. From 1910 to 1931 it includes part of the population of Vrbovsko. Sources: Croatian Bureau of Statistics publications

In 1835, Ogulin was the seat of a company. There were 538 houses, with a population of 5098, of which 3086 Catholic and 2012 Eastern Orthodox. These lived in 8 villages. Apart from Krmpote itself, these were: Ogulin, Sveti Petar, Hreljin, Vitunj, Gomirje, Vrbovsko, Jasenak and Tuk. There was one Catholic and one Orthodox parish.

In 1895, the obćina of Ogulin, with an area of 211 square kilometres (81 mi^{2}), belonged to the kotar of Ogulin (Ogulin court and electoral district) in the županija of Modruš-Rieka (Ogulin high court and financial board). There were 1138 houses, with a population of 8216. Its 9 villages and 26 hamlets were divided for taxation purposes into 6 porezne obćine, under the Ogulin office. In the 1,018 square kilometres (393 mi^{2}) Ogulin kotar, there were a total of 6082 houses, with a population of 40,325. Its 92 villages and 263 hamlets were divided into 37 porezne obćine. The kotar's only statistical market was in Ogulin. Ogulin kotar was divided into 9 općine. Besides itself: Dubrave, Generalski Stol, Gomirje, Josipdol, Modruš, Oštarije, Plaški, Tounj.

In 1910, the court of Ogulin encompassed an area of 1,195 square kilometres (461 mi^{2}), with a population of 45,107. Ogulin had its own cadastral jurisdiction and business court.

By early 1919, 4929 people had emigrated from Ogulin Kotar to the United States and 974 to other countries.

Urbanity of Ogulin: Population trends 1857–2021
v

population	3265	3543	4173	4327	4822	5362	5412	6456	5948	6707	7842	8641	9796	10525	8712	8216	7374
	1857	1869	1880	1890	1900	1910	1921	1931	1948	1953	1961	1971	1981	1991	2001	2011	2021

Note:Includes part of the population of Potok Musulinski in 1857 and 1869. Includes population of former villages Bošt, Gavani, Kalca, Kostelići, Kučinić-Selo, Lomost, Podvrh, Prapuće, Vučić-Selo and Žegar which were abolished in 1953 and 1961. In 2001 the population was decreased by the separation of Sabljak Selo, Salopek Selo, Sveti Petar and Ribarići. From 1857 to 1880, 1910 to 1931 and in 1981 and 1991 it includes Sabljak Selo. In 1981 and 1991 it includes Sveti Petar. Sources: Croatian Bureau of Statistics publications

== Governance ==
=== National ===
Representatives of Ogulin at the Sabor and Skupština: (Note: "изборни срез")

- Vito Sertić (1848)
- Josip Stipetić (1861) (Note: Ogulin vojna općina)
- Janko Stanislav Kostrenčić (1865–1867)
- Stjepan Vučetić (1884–1892), NS
- Stjepan IV Erdödy (1887–1897) (Note: Together with Jaska except for the 1892 election.)
- Nikola Tomašić (1897–1906), NLS/IS/NNS
- Nikola Šipuš (1910)
- Vladimir Nikolić Podrinski (1910–1918), IS/NS/IS-HSK/SSS-HSK
- Juraj Kučić (1920)

Representatives of Ogulin pukovnija at the Sabor:

- Ilija Hranilović, Stipan Fabiani, Petar Matić and Đuro Maravić (1848)
- Adam Gašparović, Jovo Trbojević, Petar Vrdoljak and Vaso Maravić (1861)
- Nestor Borojević, Antun Ratković and Franjo Mihanović (1865–1867)

==== 1920 ====
At the 1920 Kingdom of Serbs, Croats and Slovenes Constitutional Assembly election in Modruš-Rijeka County, Ogulin voted mainly for the Democratic Party and Croatian Peoples' Peasant Party, though a significant number voted for the Croatian Party of Rights.

Results at the polls in Ogulin
Year	Station	Voters	Electors	NRS	DSD	KPJ	HPSS	Independent	SS	HSP	HZ
1920	I	800	432		328						
1920	II	783	439	10	48	45	14	6	5	258	46

=== Municipal ===
Ogulin kotar was subordinated to Modruš-Rijeka County until 1922 when the latter was replaced with Primorje-Krajina Oblast, which was unpopular with most Croats and was as a concession replaced in 1929 with the Sava Banovina.

At the time, Ogulin was divided into 10 općine: Generalski Stol, Gomirje, Gornje Dubrave, Drežnica, Josipdol, Modruš, Ogulin, Oštarije, Plaški and Tounj.

== Culture ==
=== Parish Church of the Extolling Saint Cross ===
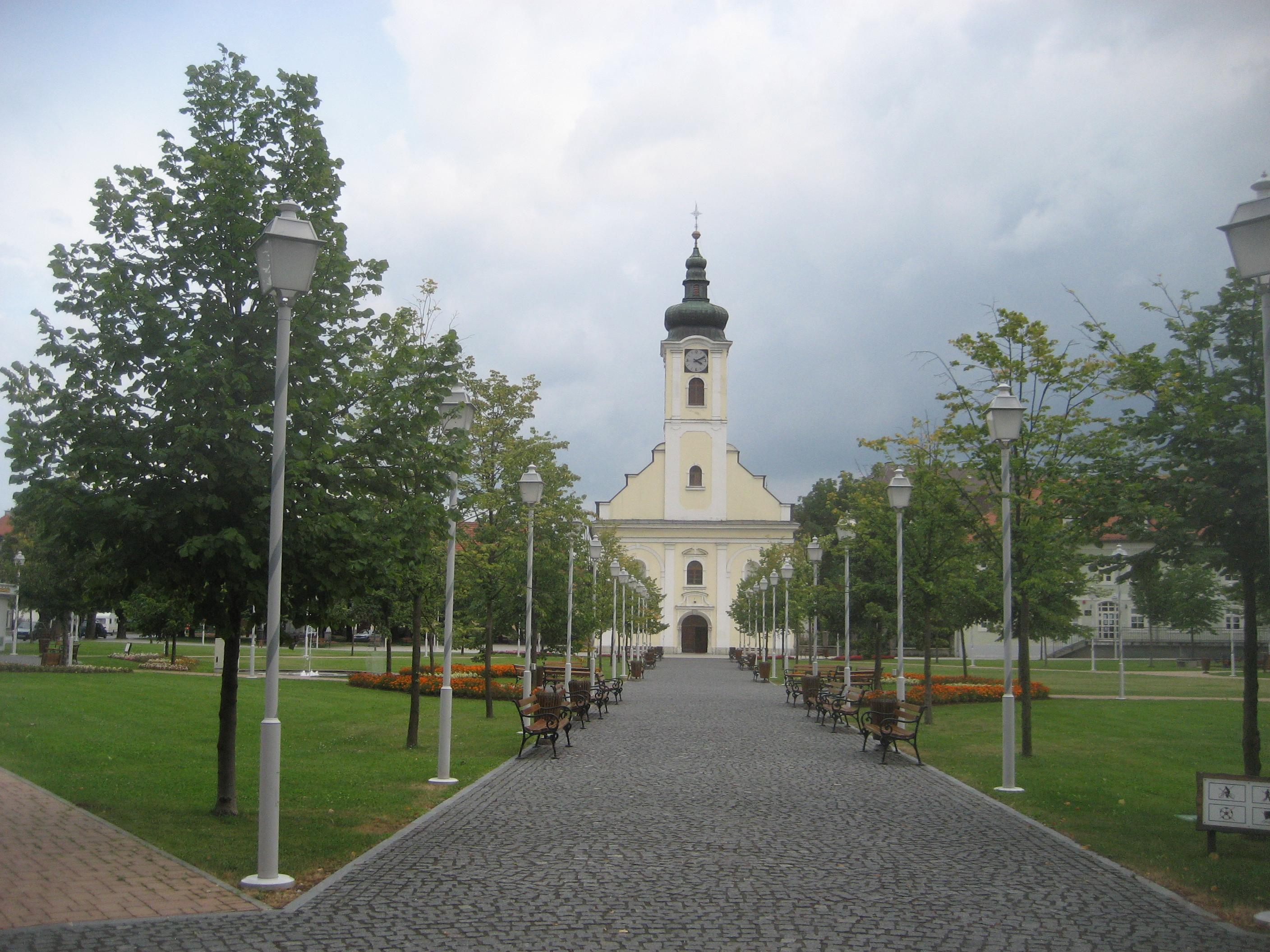
Parish Church of the Extolling Saint Cross

This church was built in 1781 in the middle of the town, in the Park of King Tomislav. Consecrated on June 1, 179, it reflects the spirit of the time with its pleasing external appearance and the richness of various sculptural decorations. The town of Ogulin celebrates September 14 as the fest day of its patron Saint of Extolling of the Cross.

=== Saint Bernard Chapel ===
Bernardin Frankopan, the son of Stjepan, and the founder of the town of Ogulin, erected a chapel in 16th century both for nobleman and ordinary people within the castle. It is devoted to St Bernardin. This chapel was the parish church from 1521 until the building of the church of St Cross in 1781. Today, only the altar has been preserved.

=== Saint Rocco Chapel ===
This chapel was built at the entrance to the town in the first half of 19th century as a votive church against cholera.

=== Frankopan Castle ===
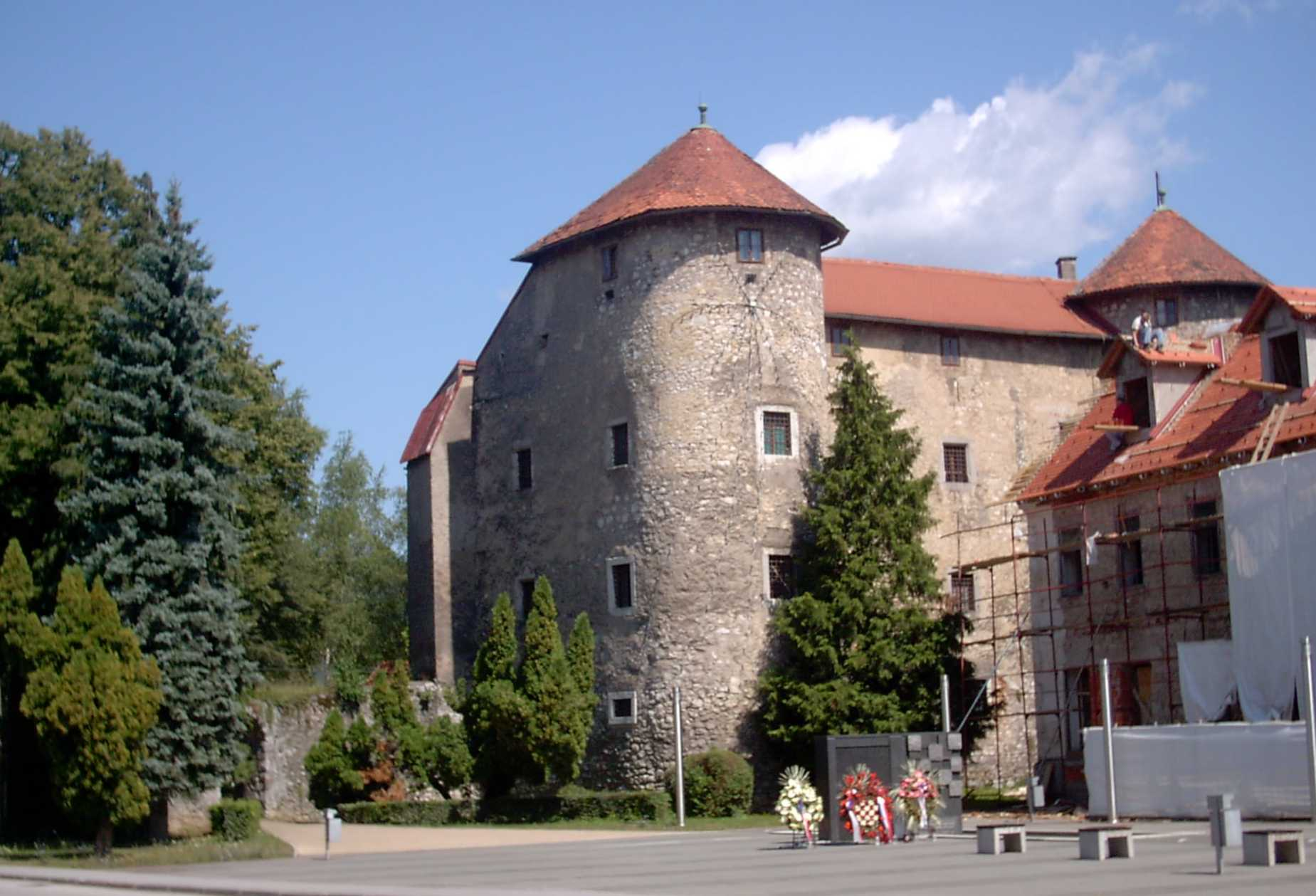
Frankopan tower

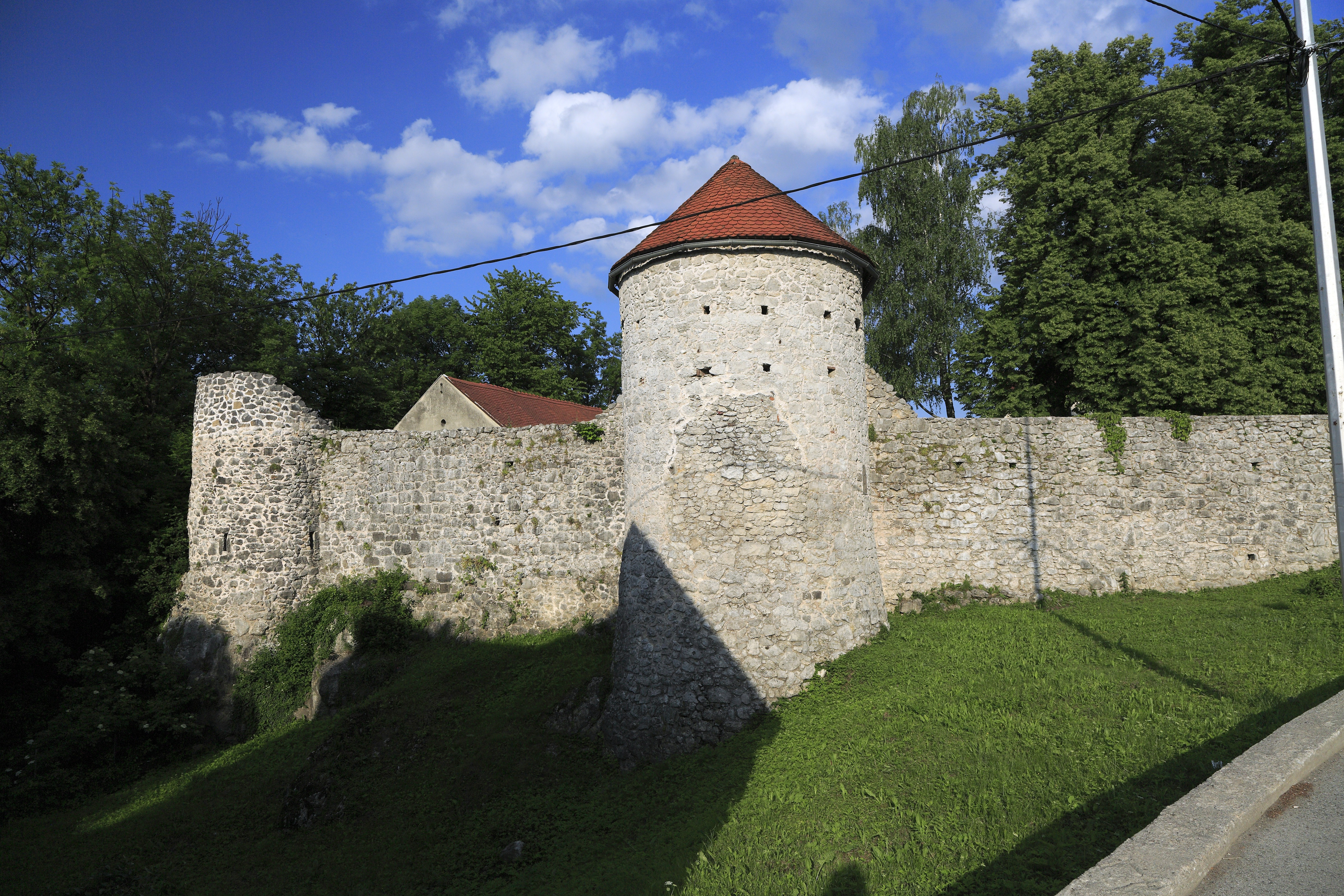
Frankopan castle

The Castle was built between 1493 and 1500 above the gorge of the River Dobra - Đula's abyss. The founder of the town was Bernardin Frankopan, one of the mightiest people of his time, and the feudal master of Modruš, Plaški, Vitunj, Tounj, Zvečaj, Bosiljevo, Novigrad and Dubovac. The Frankopans resided in the castle until 1533, when it was relinquished to the soldiers of the Military Frontier.

It belongs to the period of Renaissance castles. The town walls surrounded the courtyard area on three sides, while on the fourth there was a three-storey building with towers at the sides.

The tower eventually came to serve as the jail of the Sudbeni stol in Ogulin.

On 23 May 1941, the Ustaše raided Gornje Dubrave and carried away 29 of its residents, including the priest, railway workers, farmers, teachers and the innkeeper. Only a male and female teacher ever returned. The female teacher was raped in the Ogulin castle and was subsequently sent off to the Psychiatric Hospital "Sveti Ivan" in Stenjevec.

From 28 May through 1 June, about 70 figures from Ogulin and the surrounding area were arrested and imprisoned in the tower. Some at their homes, but most at the market or returning from it. This was in connection with a visit of Lovre Sušić to Ogulin, ostensibly for his security. Those imprisoned included the following better-known Serbs: doctor Živanović, the priest Ilija Đurčić, professors Papjevski, Stanislav Kepljevski and Grga Hećimović, students Đuro Tatalović and Žarko Momčilović, retired županijski podvornik Borojević, forest engineer Nestorović, forester Grozdanić, carpenters Đuro Tatalović and Milan Agbaba, surveyor Vlado Bijelić, store manager Bata Mićo Matijević, merchants Miloš Vuksan, Vladimir Bosnić, Ilija Ivošević, Nikola Manojlović and Vladimir Mrvoš, judge Marinko Đurić, Vlado Papić, Ivica Stošić and some others. Numerous first and second hand accounts survive.

=== The County Museum ===
The County Museum of Ogulin was opened in July 1967 in several of the Frankopan Castle halls that were being renovated and prepared between 1960 and 1967. At the time of opening it hosted a collection of works related to the workers movement, and NOB, while today it is hosting collections of various kinds: collection of stone monuments, collection of Croatian War of Independence, ethnographic collection, the memorial room of Ivana Brlić-Mažuranić (a renowned Croatian fairy-tale author), mountaineering, archaeological collection, Cell number 6, and an exhibition of the academic painter Stjepan Galetić born in Ogulin. The museum also collects objects related to old crafts and trades, old weaponry, old photographs, and the collection of postcards and greeting cards.

Considering that the County Museum of Ogulin is the only museum in the entire area between the cities of Rijeka and Karlovac, it is the only institution that works on preserving the valuable cultural and historic heritage of that wider area, and as such its task is to collect, process, present and publish the historical and cultural works, documents, and other artistic artefacts from the area of Ogulin and its neighbouring areas.

=== King Tomislav Monument ===
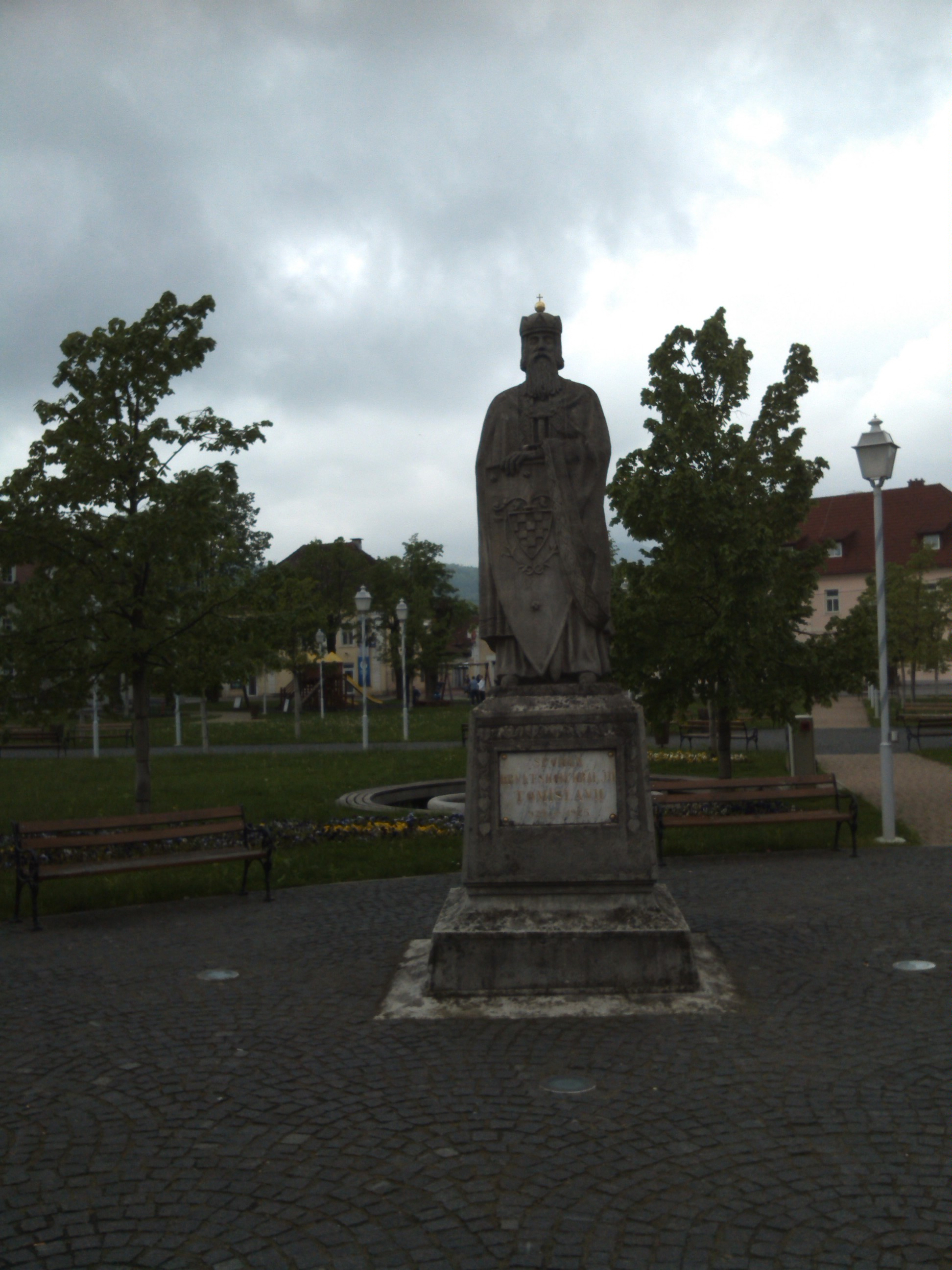
King Tomislav Monument

The monument was erected in 1925, for the 1000th anniversary of the founding of the Croatian kingdom. It stands in the Park of King Tomislav which was planned and arranged in the 18th century. The monument was made according to the design of the Slovenian architect Vitburg Meck, and was repaired in 1990.

=== Cesarovac Fountain ===
This classic building is also erected in the Park. It represents a memorial to the Ogulin aqueduct and was built by colonel Stevan Šuplikac from Ogulin in 1847. Water flowed from the spring through wooden tubes which were lately replaced by the clay, and in 1882 by the iron tubes. For Cesarovac source is connected and a legend. Water flows into the source, comes from a source located at the foot of the mountain Klek. And as on the mountain Klek lived a witch, so the water is magical. Legend says, that women who drink the water from the springs, will remain forever young. And men who drink water from springs, water will be captured to forever remain in this city, who you will fall in love with a woman from Ogulin, and by the end of life remain to live in Ogulin.

== Sports ==
The local chapter of the HPS is HPD "Klek", which had 74 members in 1936 under the Franjo Steka presidency. At the time, it had a ski section. Membership fell to 48 in 1937. In 1939, it was dormant and almost in liquidation.

== Infrastructure ==
=== Forestry ===
The forestry offices of Ogulin srez were in Ogulin, Drežnica and Jasenak.

=== Health ===
In the time of the Banovina of Croatia, Ogulin had a national hospital, a school clinic and a venereal hospice.

=== Security ===
In 1913, there were 8 gendarmeries in Delnice kotar: Ogulin, Drežnica, Generalski Stol, Jasenak, Saborsko, Josipdol, Modruš and Plaški.

=== Education ===
In the school year of 1939–1940, there were 43 schools on the territory of Ogulin srez (9 in Ogulin plus a lower real school, separate female and male trade schools, 8 in Plaški plus Građanska škola, 5 in Drežnica, 3 in Generalski Stol, 2 in Gomirje, 4 in Gornje Dubrave, 5 in Josipdol, 3 in Modruš, 2 in Oštarije, 2 in Tounj), with 105 teachers, of which 65 Catholic, 39 Orthodox and 1 other non-Muslim; there were 5647 students, of which 2999 Catholic and 2648 Orthodoxh. 1152 students obligated to attend did not, or 16.9% of the obligated population, which by national standards was very high.

=== Transportation ===
The town is connected via A1 freeway and state road D45. It also has a bus station and a train station on M202 railway.

== Notable people ==
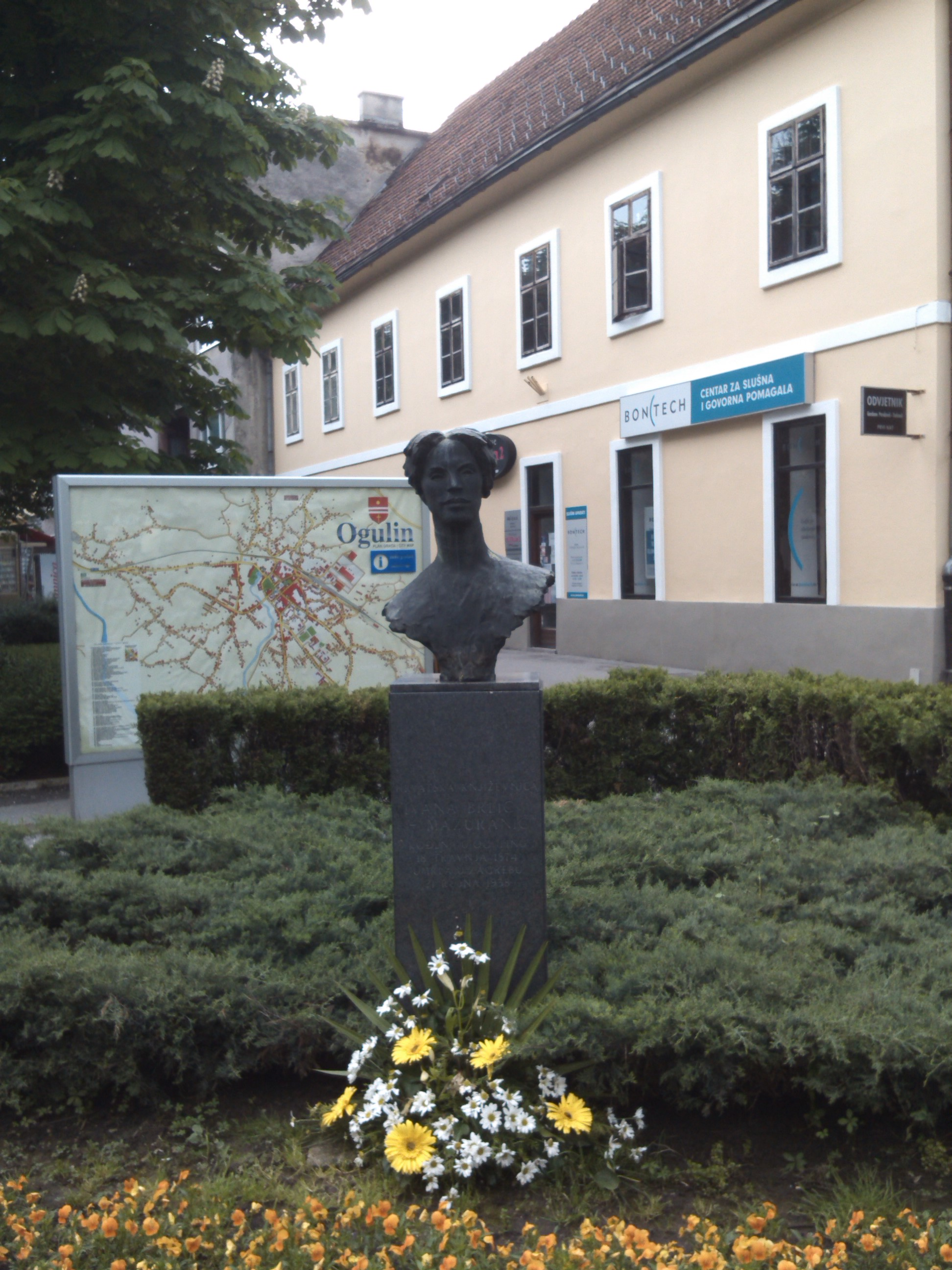
Bust of Ivana Brlić-Mažuranić in Ogulin

- Ivana Brlić-Mažuranić - writer
- Vladimir Goldner - physician, academic and professor
- Josip Kregar - lawyer and politician
- Elza Polak - horticulturist
- Ema Pukšec (also known as Ilma De Murska) - opera singer
- Barbara Radulović - television host
- Petar Stipetić - general
- Ante Pavić - tennis player
- Luka Cindrić - handball player
- Ivan Gošnjak

== Bibliography ==
=== Biology ===
- Šašić, Martina; Nahirnić, Ana; Tarmann, Gerhard M. (2016-12-31). "Zygaenidae (Lepidoptera) in the Lepidoptera collections of the Croatian Natural History Museum". Natura Croatica: Periodicum Musei Historiae Naturalis Croatici. 25 (2): 233–248. doi:10.20302/NC.2016.25.19. eISSN 1848-7386.

=== Climate ===
- Pavlić, Krešimir; Kovač, Zoran; Jurlina, Toni (2017-06-30). "Trend analysis of mean and high flows in response to climate warming - Evidence from karstic catchments in Croatia". Geofizika. 34 (1): 157–174. eISSN 1846-6346.

=== Genealogy ===
- Salopek, Hrvoje (1999). Stari rodovi Ogulinsko - modruške udoline : podrijetlo, povijest, rasprostranjenost, seobe i prezimena stanovništva Ogulina, Oštarija, Josipdola, Zagorja Ogulinskog, Modruša i okolnih naselja (in Serbo-Croatian). Ogulin, Zagreb: Matica hrvatska, Centar za kulturu, Hrvatska matica iseljenika. ISBN 953-6525-18-6. 2nd ed. 2000, ISBN 953-6525-18-6.
- Salopek, Hrvoje (2007). Ogulinsko - modruški rodovi: podrijetlo, povijest, rasprostranjenost, seobe i prezimena stanovništva ogulinskog kraja (in Serbo-Croatian). Ogulin, Zagreb: Matica hrvatska, Hrvatska matica iseljenika, Hrvatsko rodoslovno društvo "Pavao Ritter Vitezović". ISBN 978-953-6525-45-4.

=== History ===
- Matić, Zdravko (2004-12-22). "Osnivanje i rad "Napretkovih" organizacija na području Hrvatskog primorja i Gorskog kotara (1928. - 1950.)" [The Foundation and Work of "Napredak" Organisations on the Territory of Hrvatsko Primorje and Gorski Kotar]. Časopis za suvremenu povijest (in Croatian). 36 (3): 1183–1204. ISSN 1848-9079.
- Trgo, Fabijan, ed. (1964). Zbornik dokumenata i podataka o Narodno-oslobodilačkom ratu Jugoslovenskih naroda. Vol. V, 32.
- Banska vlast Banovine Hrvatske (1940e). "Srezovi". Godišnjak banske vlasti Banovine Hrvatske (in Croatian). Vol. 1. pp. 330–337.
- Banska vlast Banovine Hrvatske (1940a). "Seljačka prosvjeta". Godišnjak banske vlasti Banovine Hrvatske. Vol. 1. pp. 42–49.
- Urednik (1914-03-07). "Iz ABC družtva". Jutarnji list (in Croatian). Vol. 3, no. 607. p. 5. ISSN 1334-1855.
- Fras, Franz Julius (1835). "Das Oguliner Regiment" [The Ogulin Regiment]. Vollständige Topographie der Karlstädter-Militärgrenze mit besonderer Rücksicht auf die Beschreibung der Schlösser, Ruinen, Inscriptionen und andern dergleichen Ueberbleibseln von Antiquitäten: nach Anschauung und aus den zuverlässigsten Quellen dargestellt für reisende, und zur Förderung der Vaterlandsliebe (in German). Zagreb: Franz Suppan. pp. 275–329.

=== Alpinism ===
- Poljak, Željko (February 1959). "Okolina Ogulina". Kazalo za "Hrvatski planinar" i "Naše planine" 1898—1958 (PDF). Vol. XI. p. 8. ISSN 0354-0650.
