= Erdelj =

Erdelj may refer to:

- Erdelj, historical Serbian and Croatian name for Transylvania
- Erdelj, Croatia, a village near Generalski Stol
