= Popovo Selo =

Settlement in Karlovac County, Croatia

- Settlement
- Interactive map of Popovo Selo
- Location of Popovo Selo in Croatia
- Coordinates: 45°18′50″N 15°15′18″E
- Country: Croatia
- County: Karlovac County
- City: Ogulin

Area
  - Total: 17.2 km^{2} (6.6 sq mi)

Population (2021)
  - Total: 43
  - Density: 2.5/km^{2} (6.5/sq mi)
- Time zone: UTC+1 (CET)
  - Summer (DST): UTC+2 (CEST)
- Postal code: 47300 Ogulin
- Area code: +385 (0)47

Popovo Selo is a settlement in the City of Ogulin in Croatia. In 2021, its population was 43.

== Name ==
It was recorded as Popouszelistse on the 1673 map of Stjepan Glavač.

== Demographics ==
Popovo Selo: Population trends 1857–2021
v

population	478	680	657	439	454	596	502	459	384	362	277	182	129	63	58	46	43
	1857	1869	1880	1890	1900	1910	1921	1931	1948	1953	1961	1971	1981	1991	2001	2011	2021

Sources: Croatian Bureau of Statistics publications

== Bibliography ==
- Melem Hajdarović, Mihela (2023-06-14). "Glavačeva karta Hrvatske iz 1673. – njezini toponimi, geografski sadržaj i historijskogeografski kontekst" [Glavač’s map of Croatia from 1673: Its toponyms, geographical content, and historical-geographical context]. Studia lexicographica. 17 (32): 47–78. doi:10.33604/sl.17.32.2. eISSN 2459-5578.
