= Puškarići =

Settlement in Karlovac County, Croatia

- Settlement
- Interactive map of Puškarići
- Location of Puškarići in Croatia
- Coordinates: 45°15′58″N 15°11′35″E
- Country: Croatia
- County: Karlovac County
- City: Ogulin

Area
  - Total: 6.1 km^{2} (2.4 sq mi)

Population (2021)
  - Total: 433
  - Density: 71/km^{2} (180/sq mi)
- Time zone: UTC+1 (CET)
  - Summer (DST): UTC+2 (CEST)
- Postal code: 47300 Ogulin
- Area code: +385 (0)47

Puškarići is a settlement in the City of Ogulin in Croatia. In 2021, its population was 433.

== Demographics ==
Puškarići: Population trends 1857–2021
v

population	115			290	303	357	341	335	288	334	341	364	387	411	392	439	433
	1857	1869	1880	1890	1900	1910	1921	1931	1948	1953	1961	1971	1981	1991	2001	2011	2021

Sources: Croatian Bureau of Statistics publications
