= Salopek Selo =

Settlement in Karlovac County, Croatia

- Settlement
- Interactive map of Salopek Selo
- Location of Salopek Selo in Croatia
- Coordinates: 45°14′13″N 15°13′12″E
- Country: Croatia
- County: Karlovac County
- City: Ogulin

Area
  - Total: 11.8 km^{2} (4.6 sq mi)

Population (2021)
  - Total: 223
  - Density: 18.9/km^{2} (48.9/sq mi)
- Time zone: UTC+1 (CET)
  - Summer (DST): UTC+2 (CEST)
- Postal code: 47300 Ogulin
- Area code: +385 (0)47

Salopek Selo is a settlement in the City of Ogulin in Croatia. In 2021, its population was 223.

== History ==
On 1 June 1942, Partisans confiscated 23 large and 54 small livestock from Salopek Selo.

== Demographics ==
Salopek Selo: Population trends 1857–2021
v

population				405	433				469	435	454	453	378	332	290	246	223
	1857	1869	1880	1890	1900	1910	1921	1931	1948	1953	1961	1971	1981	1991	2001	2011	2021

Sources: Croatian Bureau of Statistics publications

== Bibliography ==
- Trgo, Fabijan, ed. (1964). Zbornik dokumenata i podataka o Narodno-oslobodilačkom ratu Jugoslovenskih naroda. Vol. V, 32.
