= Dujmić Selo =

Settlement in Karlovac County, Croatia

- Settlement
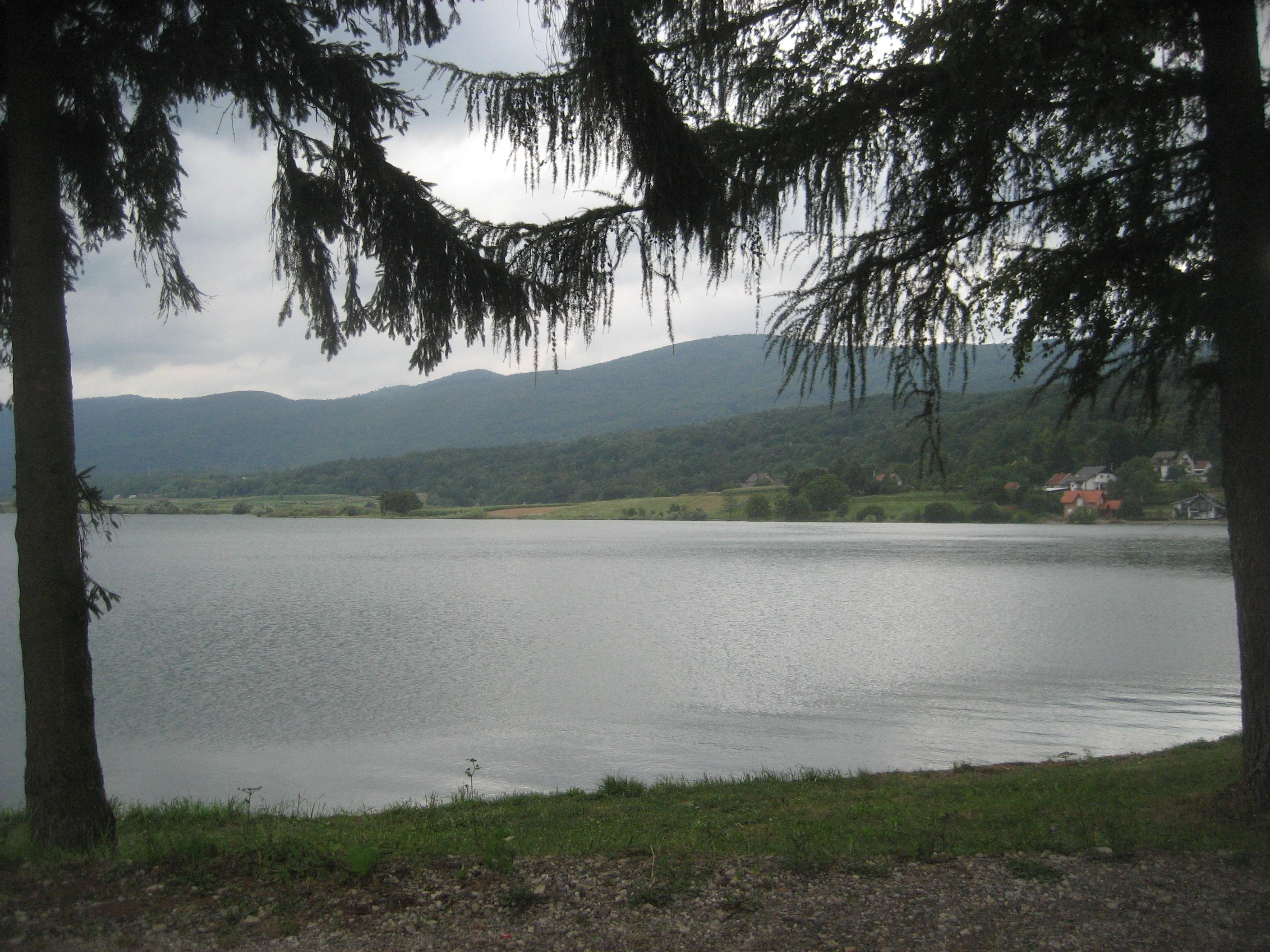
- Lake Sabljaci, with settlement on right side of image
- Interactive map of Dujmić Selo
- Location of Dujmić Selo in Croatia
- Coordinates: 45°13′30″N 15°13′19″E
- Country: Croatia
- County: Karlovac County
- City: Ogulin

Area
  - Total: 2.3 km^{2} (0.89 sq mi)

Population (2021)
  - Total: 114
  - Density: 50/km^{2} (130/sq mi)
- Time zone: UTC+1 (CET)
  - Summer (DST): UTC+2 (CEST)
- Postal code: 47300 Ogulin
- Area code: +385 (0)47

Dujmić Selo is a settlement in the City of Ogulin in Croatia. In 2021, its population was 114.

== Demographics ==
Dujmić Selo: Population trends 1857–2021
v

population									98	151	122	119	120	129	126	142	114
	1857	1869	1880	1890	1900	1910	1921	1931	1948	1953	1961	1971	1981	1991	2001	2011	2021

Sources: Croatian Bureau of Statistics publications
