= Donje Dubrave =

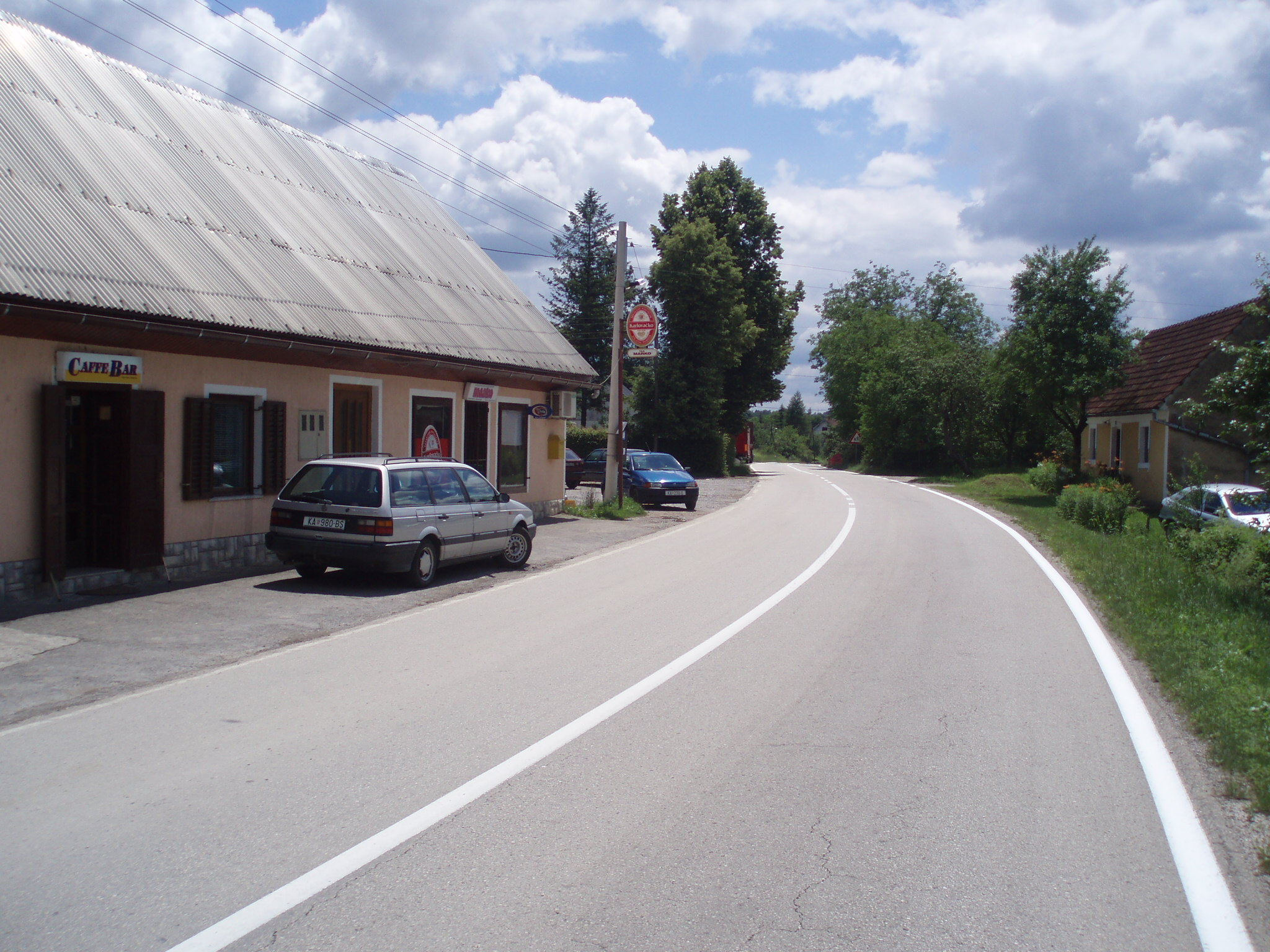

- Location within Croatia
- Coordinates: 45°19′01″N 15°22′01″E
- Country: Croatia
- County: Karlovac
- City: Ogulin

Area
  - Total: 21.9 km^{2} (8.5 sq mi)

Population (2021)
  - Total: 152
  - Density: 6.94/km^{2} (18.0/sq mi)
- Time zone: UTC+1 (CET)
  - Summer (DST): UTC+2 (CEST)

Donje Dubrave is a village in Karlovac County, Croatia. It is located in the municipality of Ogulin on the old Josephine Road connecting Duga Resa and Senj. The Rijeka-Zagreb railway passes through the village. It has 250 inhabitants, most of them working on the railway in the nearby cities of Ogulin (about 25 km) and Karlovac (about 30 km away). There is an elementary school in the village that was attended by five students until a few years ago. The school is currently closed and the students attend school in Ogulin and Generalski Stol.

== History ==
Donje Dubrave was first mentioned in 1658. It was settled by Orthodox immigrants from Bosnia, which was under Ottoman occupation. The people were very loyal to the Austrian Empire. They were predominantly soldiers defending their new land from Ottoman incursions.

=== WWII ===
==== 1941 ====
On 10 April 1941, the telegraph station at Donje Dubrave received news that the Wehrmacht had entered Zagreb along with the request that railway workers continue to operate their stations, in exchange for twice the pay, signed by a certain Marković. The same day, the Croatian flag was observed flying on the municipal (Croatian: općina) building in Donje Dubrave.

The first foreign troops to arrive in Donje Dubrave were from the Royal Italian Army, on 12 April. Germans went through later.

On 21 April, Jandre Jaković was arrested, ostensibly for belonging to a Chetnik organisation. When Franjo Ahil came to transport him to prison, he left him by a well unbound, so Jaković was able to escape. This was the first arrest in Donje Dubrave.

In May, the Ustaša government began targeting known and suspected JRZ members with arrests. The only prominent JRZ member in Dubrave at the time was Simo Vučinić.

For fear of imprisonment or deportation, most Serb males aged 16 and up slept at night in the forest in those months. According to Milan Jaković, it was sufficient to go 100 metres (330 ft) from house or road fore safety from the Ustaše.

On 30 July, many Serb villagers of Dubrave were arrested at the market in Ogulin, having come there to sell, including Mihajlo Jaković of Donje Dubrave, acting against the advice of his father Simo. Beginning with the next market on 6 August, the Serbs stopped coming out of fear that it would happen a third time.

==== 1942 ====
On 8 July 1942, a train derailed between Generalski Stol and Donje Dubrave, resulting in the destruction of 3 wagons and 2 locomotives. Then on the 10th, a passenger train between Donje and Gornje Dubrave was derailed by a section of destroyed track, destroying both its locomotives. The armoured train could not come to its assistance because on the same day, another passenger train was derailed between Generalski Stol and Donje Dubrave. Partisans emptied 2 wagons. Among the dead there were 2 Ustaše, while the fate of another officer and soldier who had been on board remained unknown.

== Geography ==
Donje Dubrave is in the hilly region of western Kordun. A few kilometers to the east is the Mrežnica River, where there is a Croatian nature park with impressive waterfalls.

== Demographics ==
As of 2011, the village had 199 residents. This represents 58.19% of its pre-war population according to the 1991 census.

Population change 1857-2011
v

population			812	878	846	858	859	900	641	632	550	498	418	342	249	199
	1857	1869	1880	1890	1900	1910	1921	1931	1948	1953	1961	1971	1981	1991	2001	2011

Sources: Croatian Bureau of Statistics publications

== Notable natives and residents ==
- Rade Janjanin (1919-1943) - antifascist and People's Hero of Yugoslavia
- Đuro Zatezalo (-2017) - historian and former Director of Karlovac Archives (1965-1992)

== See also ==
- Desinec, Croatia
- Hreljin

== Bibliography ==
- Trgo, Fabijan, ed. (1964). Zbornik dokumenata i podataka o Narodno-oslobodilačkom ratu Jugoslovenskih naroda. Vol. V, 32.
- Fras, Franz Julius (1835). "Dubraver-Kompagnie" [Dubrave Company]. Vollständige Topographie der Karlstädter-Militärgrenze mit besonderer Rücksicht auf die Beschreibung der Schlösser, Ruinen, Inscriptionen und andern dergleichen Ueberbleibseln von Antiquitäten: nach Anschauung und aus den zuverlässigsten Quellen dargestellt für reisende, und zur Förderung der Vaterlandsliebe (in German). Zagreb: Franz Suppan. pp. 324–326.
