= Sabljak Selo =

Settlement in Karlovac County, Croatia

- Settlement
- Interactive map of Sabljak Selo
- Location of Sabljak Selo in Croatia
- Coordinates: 45°14′10″N 15°13′34″E
- Country: Croatia
- County: Karlovac County
- City: Ogulin

Area
  - Total: 1.4 km^{2} (0.54 sq mi)

Population (2021)
  - Total: 252
  - Density: 180/km^{2} (470/sq mi)
- Time zone: UTC+1 (CET)
  - Summer (DST): UTC+2 (CEST)
- Postal code: 47300 Ogulin
- Area code: +385 (0)47

Sabljak Selo is a settlement in the City of Ogulin in Croatia. In 2021, its population was 252.

== Demographics ==
Sabljak Selo: Population trends 1857–2021
v

population				138	64				167	166	192	199			241	254	252
	1857	1869	1880	1890	1900	1910	1921	1931	1948	1953	1961	1971	1981	1991	2001	2011	2021

Sources: Croatian Bureau of Statistics publications
