= Lipa, Karlovac County =

Lipa
- Village
- Location within Croatia
- Coordinates: 45.405°N 15.392°E
- Country: Croatia
- County: Karlovac County
- City: Generalski Stol

Area
  - Total: 1.2 km^{2} (0.46 sq mi)

Population (2021)
  - Total: 24
  - Density: 20/km^{2} (52/sq mi)
- Time zone: UTC+1 (CET)
  - Summer (DST): UTC+2 (CEST)
- Postal code: 47250 Duga Resa
- Area code: +385 (0)47

Lipa is a village in Croatia, under the Generalski Stol township, in Karlovac County.

== Demographics ==
Village of Lipa: Population trends 1857–2021
v

population	113	110	122	128	121	130	113	138	130	106	111	88	78	69	47	39	24
	1857	1869	1880	1890	1900	1910	1921	1931	1948	1953	1961	1971	1981	1991	2001	2011	2021

Sources: Croatian Bureau of Statistics publications

== Climate ==
A weather station exists there at an elevation of 152 metres (499 ft). The minimum recorded temperature for the winter of 2024–2025 was −11.6 °C (11.1 °F), on February 25th.

== Bibliography ==
- Martinković (1854-04-10) [written 1854-03-14]. "Poziv od strane ureda c. kr. podžupani karlovačke nižepodpisani vojnoj dužnosti podvèrženi momci". Carsko kraljevske službene narodne novine (in Serbo-Croatian). Vol. 20, no. 82. p. 217. ISSN 1333-5243.
- Podžupan (1859-07-27) [written 1859-06-14]. "Poziv". Carsko kraljevske službene narodne novine (in Serbo-Croatian). Vol. 20, no. 170. pp. 433–434. ISSN 1333-5243.
