= Sveti Petar, Karlovac County =

Settlement in Karlovac County, Croatia

Sveti Petar
- Settlement
- Interactive map of Sveti Petar
- Location of Sveti Petar in Croatia
- Coordinates: 45°16′08″N 15°12′14″E
- Country: Croatia
- County: Karlovac County
- City: Ogulin

Area
  - Total: 6.3 km^{2} (2.4 sq mi)

Population (2021)
  - Total: 613
  - Density: 97/km^{2} (250/sq mi)
- Time zone: UTC+1 (CET)
  - Summer (DST): UTC+2 (CEST)
- Postal code: 47300 Ogulin
- Area code: +385 (0)47

Sveti Petar is a settlement in the City of Ogulin in Croatia. In 2021, its population was 613.

== Demographics ==
Sveti Petar: Population trends 1857–2021
v

population	501	622	656	466	482	477	446	485	533	548	621	630			633	651	613
	1857	1869	1880	1890	1900	1910	1921	1931	1948	1953	1961	1971	1981	1991	2001	2011	2021

Sources: Croatian Bureau of Statistics publications

In 1835, Sveti Petar belonged to Ogulin. There were 46 houses, with a population of 399. Its residents were Catholic.
