= Zagore =

Zagore may refer to:

- Zagore (region) (also Zagora, Zagorie, Zagoriya), a region in medieval Bulgaria
- Zagore, Croatia, a village Mošćenička Draga Municipality, Primorje-Gorski Kotar County, Croatia
- Zagore, Stara Zagora Province, a village Stara Zagora Municipality, Stara Zagora Province, Bulgaria
- Shopluk Zagore, a region in Bulgaria

== See also ==
- Zagorë, a village Shkrel Municipality, Malësi e Madhe District, Shkodër County, Albania
- Zagora (disambiguation)
- Zagori (disambiguation)
- Zagorje (disambiguation)
- Záhorie, a region in Slovakia
