= Zagori (disambiguation) =

Zagori is a municipality and a region in Epirus, Greece.

Zagori may also refer to:

- Zagori, Albania, an ex municipality in southern Albania
- Zagoria (newspaper), a newspaper published in Albania
- Donald S. Zagoria (1928–2025), American author

== See also ==
- Zagora (disambiguation)
- Zagore (disambiguation)
- Zagorje (disambiguation)
- Záhorie, a region in Slovakia
