= Trošmarija =

Settlement in Karlovac County, Croatia

- Settlement
- Interactive map of Trošmarija
- Location of Trošmarija in Croatia
- Coordinates: 45°19′30″N 15°16′26″E
- Country: Croatia
- County: Karlovac County
- City: Ogulin

Area
  - Total: 9.5 km^{2} (3.7 sq mi)

Population (2021)
  - Total: 91
  - Density: 9.6/km^{2} (25/sq mi)
- Time zone: UTC+1 (CET)
  - Summer (DST): UTC+2 (CEST)
- Postal code: 47300 Ogulin
- Area code: +385 (0)47

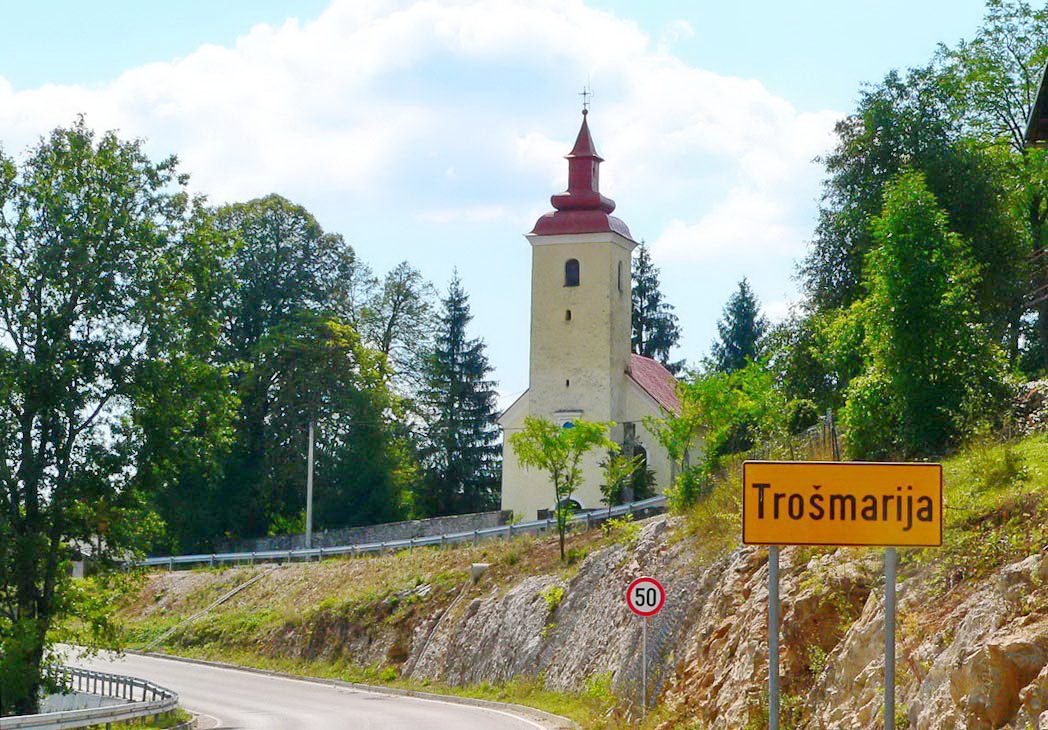
Trosmarija

Trošmarija is a settlement in the City of Ogulin in Croatia. In 2021, its population was 91.

== Demographics ==
Trošmarija: Population trends 1857–2021
v

population	319			588	539	314	302	505	512	492	407	299	262	165	130	127	91
	1857	1869	1880	1890	1900	1910	1921	1931	1948	1953	1961	1971	1981	1991	2001	2011	2021

Sources: Croatian Bureau of Statistics publications
