= Zagora =

Zagora may refer to:

== Places ==
=== Africa ===
- Zagora, Morocco
- Zagora Province, Morocco
- Mount Zagora, a mountain in south-eastern Morocco

=== Asia ===
- Zagora (Paphlagonia), a town of ancient Paphlagonia

=== Europe ===
- Zagora, Greece, a village in Thessaly, Greece
- Dalmatian Zagora, a region in Croatia
- Zagóra (disambiguation), several places in Poland
- Zagore (region), an area in Bulgaria
  - Stara Zagora, a city in Bulgaria
  - Nova Zagora, a city in Bulgaria
- Zagora, Kanal ob Soči, a village in the Municipality of Kanal ob Soči, western Slovenia
- Zagora, Krapina-Zagorje County, a village near Krapina, Croatia
- Zagora, Trebinje, a village near Trebinje, Bosnia and Herzegovina

== Other uses ==
- Zagora (horse) (born 2007), thoroughbred racehorse
- Zagora (Loose Ends album), an album by R&B band Loose Ends

== See also ==
- Zagori (disambiguation)
- Zagore (disambiguation)
- Zagorje (disambiguation)
- Záhorie, a region in Slovakia
