= Gorinci =

- Village
- Location within Croatia
- Coordinates: 45.356°N 15.344°E
- Country: Croatia
- County: Karlovac County
- City: Generalski Stol

Area
  - Total: 1.4 km^{2} (0.54 sq mi)

Population (2021)
  - Total: 78
  - Density: 56/km^{2} (140/sq mi)
- Time zone: UTC+1 (CET)
  - Summer (DST): UTC+2 (CEST)
- Postal code: 47250 Duga Resa
- Area code: +385 (0)47

Gorinci is a village in Croatia, under the Generalski Stol township, in Karlovac County.

== Demographics ==
Village of Gorinci: Population trends 1857–2021
v

population	148	182	197	180	169			169	180	176	164	139	124	173	115	91	78
	1857	1869	1880	1890	1900	1910	1921	1931	1948	1953	1961	1971	1981	1991	2001	2011	2021

Note:Do 1900. iskazivano pod imenom Lešće. U 1910. i 1921. podaci sadržani u naselju Skukani. Sources: Croatian Bureau of Statistics publications

== Governance ==
=== National ===
At the 1920 Kingdom of Serbs, Croats and Slovenes Constitutional Assembly election in Modruš-Rijeka County, Lešće voted mainly for the Croatian People's Peasant Party.

Results at the poll in Lešće
Year	Voters	Electors	NRS	DSD	KPJ	HPSS	Independent	SS	HSP	HZ
1920	757	412	1		1	395	2			13

=== Local ===
It is the seat of its own local committee.

== Name ==
Lešće was recorded as Lestsi on the 1673 map of Stjepan Glavač.

== Climate ==
Since records began in 2002, the highest temperature recorded at the local weather station was 41.4 °C (106.5 °F), on 8 August 2013. The coldest temperature was −20.3 °C (−4.5 °F), on 1 January 2015.

== Bibliography ==
- Melem Hajdarović, Mihela (2023-06-14). "Glavačeva karta Hrvatske iz 1673. – njezini toponimi, geografski sadržaj i historijskogeografski kontekst" [Glavač’s map of Croatia from 1673: Its toponyms, geographical content, and historical-geographical context]. Studia lexicographica. 17 (32): 47–78. doi:10.33604/sl.17.32.2. eISSN 2459-5578.
