= Otok Oštarijski =

Otok Oštarijski Оток Оштаријски
- Location within Croatia
- Coordinates: 45°14′10″N 15°15′14″E
- Country: Croatia
- County: Karlovac
- City: Ogulin

Area
  - Total: 8.2 km^{2} (3.2 sq mi)

Population (2021)
  - Total: 344
  - Density: 42/km^{2} (110/sq mi)
- Time zone: UTC+1 (CET)
  - Summer (DST): UTC+2 (CEST)
- Postal code: 47300 Ogulin
- Area code: +385 (0)47

Otok Oštarijski is a village in Karlovac County, Croatia. It is located in the municipality of Ogulin.

== History ==
In late May 1941, the Ustaše arrested about 30 villagers from Otok Oštarijski and imprisoned them in the Ogulin castle, transferred on 6 June to the Danica concentration camp, and finally the Jadovno concentration camp. None survived.

== Demographics ==
Village of Otok Oštarijski: Population trends 1857–2021
v

| population | 467 | 536 | 407 | 431 | 431 | 417 | 395 | 449 | 364 | 353 | 345 | 456 | 428 | 471 | 446 | 381 | 344 |
| | 1857 | 1869 | 1880 | 1890 | 1900 | 1910 | 1921 | 1931 | 1948 | 1953 | 1961 | 1971 | 1981 | 1991 | 2001 | 2011 | 2021 |

Note:Iskazano pod imenom Otok do 1900., Otok Oštarski od 1910. do 1948. Sources: Croatian Bureau of Statistics publications
