= Zagorje, Ogulin =

Zagorje
- Location within Croatia
- Coordinates: 45.201°N 15.237°E
- Country: Croatia
- County: Karlovac County
- City: Ogulin

Area
  - Total: 2.3 km^{2} (0.89 sq mi)

Population (2021)
  - Total: 102
  - Density: 44/km^{2} (110/sq mi)
- Website: www.ogulin.hr

Zagorje is a settlement in Karlovac County, Croatia, and is a suburb of Ogulin

A village of the same name was mentioned in the Modrus Feudal Law. Zagorje is the traditional name for the valley south of the artificial Lake Sabljaci. However, today, the region is divided into several villages.

Between Zagorje and neighboring village Desmerice is the water source of Zagorska Mrežnica.

According to the population census of 2001, Zagorje consisted of 127 residents and 51 family households.

== Sources ==
- 2001 Ogulin Census
- The Official Website of Ogulin

== Bibliography ==
=== Genealogy ===
- Salopek, Hrvoje (1999). Stari rodovi Ogulinsko - modruške udoline : podrijetlo, povijest, rasprostranjenost, seobe i prezimena stanovništva Ogulina, Oštarija, Josipdola, Zagorja Ogulinskog, Modruša i okolnih naselja (in Serbo-Croatian). Ogulin, Zagreb: Matica hrvatska, Centar za kulturu, Hrvatska matica iseljenika. ISBN 953-6525-18-6. 2nd ed. 2000, ISBN 953-6525-18-6.
- Salopek, Hrvoje (2007). Ogulinsko - modruški rodovi: podrijetlo, povijest, rasprostranjenost, seobe i prezimena stanovništva ogulinskog kraja (in Serbo-Croatian). Ogulin, Zagreb: Matica hrvatska, Hrvatska matica iseljenika, Hrvatsko rodoslovno društvo "Pavao Ritter Vitezović". ISBN 978-953-6525-45-4.

=== History ===
- Lopašić, Radoslav (1894). "Urbar Modruški od g. 1486" [The Modruš Urbarium of the Year 1486]. Hrvatski urbari. Monumenta historico-iuridica Slavorum meridionalium (in Croatian). Vol. 5, 1. pp. 20–81.
  - Republished: Lopašić, Radoslav (1997). Abramović, Ignacije (ed.). Urbar modruški [The Modruš Urbarium] (in Croatian). Ogulin: Ogranak Matice hrvatske. ISBN 953-96393-4-4. Tirage: 500.
