= Vladimir Goldner =

Croatian physician (1933–2017)

- Born: 19 December 1933; Ogulin, Kingdom of Yugoslavia, (now Croatia)
- Died: 13 November 2017 (aged 83); Zagreb, Croatia
- Education: University of Zagreb
- Occupation: Physician

Vladimir Goldner (19 December 1933 – 13 November 2017) was a Croatian physician, academic and professor at the School of Medicine, University of Zagreb.

== Early life ==
Goldner was born in Ogulin, Yugoslavia (now Croatia) to a Jewish family. He attended elementary and high school in Ogulin. During World War II, Goldner was interned in concentration camps in Kraljevica (Italian: Porto Re) and Rab (Italian: Arbe) as part of The Holocaust. He eventually escaped Nazi-controlled territory and traveled to Split, Croatia where he was liberated by Yugoslav Partisans. From 1953 to 1959, Goldner studied medicine at the University of Zagreb. Goldner finished his medical certification training at a hospital in Sisak.

== Career ==
From 1961 to 1964, he worked as a general practitioner at a community health center in Trnje, Zagreb. In 1968 he finished an internal medicine specialization at the general Hospital Josip Kajfeš (now Sveti Duh), Zagreb. From 1968 to 1973, Goldner worked as a physician specializing in internal medicine there and at University Hospital Centre Zagreb. In 1976, with a scholarship from the French government, he finished his training at the Paris cardiology clinics.

Goldner pioneered the medical techniques of electrophysiology and electrostimulation. He was the first doctor to introduce the medical procedure radiofrequency ablation in Croatia. Goldner was one of the first in the world who applied and participated in the teleprogramming of the DDDR pacemaker. Goldner, along with Radovan Ivančić, was the first to publish a paper about the beneficial effects of propafenone in the treatment of atrial fibrillation and ventricular beats. He was the first to publish a complete review of attitudes and guidelines on the work capacity in patients with heart arrhythmias. In 1978, Goldner was awarded the Doctor of Science title and in 1996 he was officially named cardiology subspecialists by the Ministry of Health of the Republic of Croatia.

He was the chairman of the Institute for Heart Diseases and Blood Vessels, and chairman of the clinic for diseases of the heart and blood vessels at the University Hospital Centre Zagreb. Goldner is the author and coauthor of more than 200 papers. He co-owned four patents in the field of electrocardiography. Goldner mentored 10 master theses and doctoral dissertations and guided 10 completed research projects. He was the lecturer and course leader in the postgraduate studies in cardiology, pulmonary medicine, clinical pharmacology and emergency medicine. He was the member of the Croatian Academy of Sciences and Arts, European Society of Cardiology and North American Society of Pacing and Electrophysiology. Goldner was a member of the editorial board at the Acta Medica Croatica and Journal of Clinical and Experimental Cardiology. In 1990, he was awarded the city of Zagreb award for his discovery in the field of electrocardiography and in 1995 with the Strossmayer award for the best scientific work.

== Bibliography ==
- Snješka Knežević, Aleksander Laslo (2011). Židovski Zagreb. Zagreb: AGM, Židovska općina Zagreb. ISBN 978-953-174-393-8.
