= Ribare =

Ribare may refer to:

- Ribare (Kruševac), a village in Serbia
- Ribare (Žagubica), a village in Serbia
- Ribare (Jagodina), a village in Serbia
- Ribare (Svrljig), a village in Serbia

== See also ==
- Ribari (disambiguation)
