= Desmerice =

Settlement in Karlovac County, Croatia

- Settlement
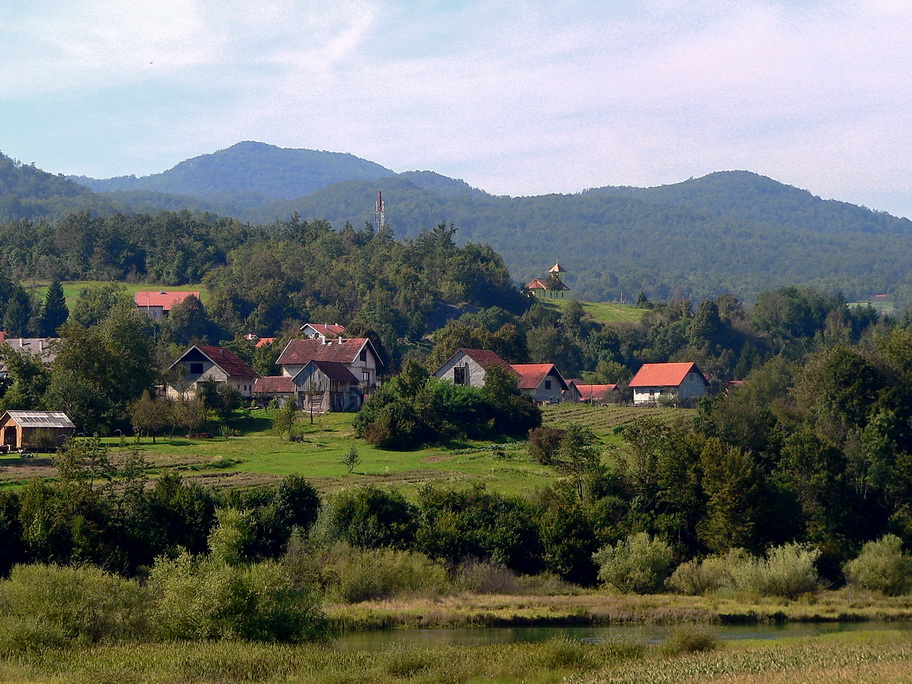
- Desmerice, village near Ogulin, Croatia
- Interactive map of Desmerice
- Location of Desmerice in Croatia
- Coordinates: 45°12′11″N 15°13′08″E
- Country: Croatia
- County: Karlovac County
- City: Ogulin

Area
  - Total: 14.7 km^{2} (5.7 sq mi)

Population (2021)
  - Total: 231
  - Density: 15.7/km^{2} (40.7/sq mi)
- Time zone: UTC+1 (CET)
  - Summer (DST): UTC+2 (CEST)
- Postal code: 47300 Ogulin
- Area code: +385 (0)47

Desmerice is a settlement in the City of Ogulin in Croatia. In 2021, its population was 231.

== Demographics ==
Desmerice: Population trends 1857–2021
v

population	336			437	482	495	482	528	298	531	481	413	340	310	278	262	231
	1857	1869	1880	1890	1900	1910	1921	1931	1948	1953	1961	1971	1981	1991	2001	2011	2021

Sources: Croatian Bureau of Statistics publications
