= Donje Zagorje =

Settlement in Karlovac County, Croatia

- Settlement
- Interactive map of Donje Zagorje
- Location of Donje Zagorje in Croatia
- Coordinates: 45°10′41″N 15°13′34″E
- Country: Croatia
- County: Karlovac County
- City: Ogulin

Area
  - Total: 21.2 km^{2} (8.2 sq mi)

Population (2021)
  - Total: 198
  - Density: 9.34/km^{2} (24.2/sq mi)
- Time zone: UTC+1 (CET)
  - Summer (DST): UTC+2 (CEST)
- Postal code: 47300 Ogulin
- Area code: +385 (0)47

Donje Zagorje is a settlement in the City of Ogulin in Croatia. In 2021, its population was 198.

== Demographics ==
Donje Zagorje: Population trends 1857–2021
v

population	465	426	451	484	517	548	500	466	694	535	487	427	425	279	252	230	198
	1857	1869	1880	1890	1900	1910	1921	1931	1948	1953	1961	1971	1981	1991	2001	2011	2021

Sources: Croatian Bureau of Statistics publications
