= Zagorë, Vushtrri =

Zagorë: Zagorë (Albanian); Zagorje (Serbian)
- Village
- Location within Kosovo
- Coordinates: 42°49′48″N 21°4′48″E
- Location: Kosovo
- District: Mitrovica
- Municipality: Vushtrri

Population (2011)
  - Total: 18
- Time zone: UTC+1 (Central European Time)
  - Summer (DST): UTC+2 (CEST)

Zagorë (post 2002 alternative name: Zogaj; Serbian: Zagorje) is a village located in the Municipality of Vushtrri, District of Mitrovica, Kosovo.

== Geography ==
Village has a close geographical position toward five municipal centres in north-eastern Kosovo: Vushtrri (9 km / 6 mi. W), Podujevë (13 km / 8 mi. NE), Obiliq (16 km / 10 mi. S), Mitrovica (18 km / 11 mi. WNW), Pristina (19 km / 12 mi. SSE).

Zagorje borders with Dumnica e Krasniqes (3 km / 2 mi. SE), Samodreža (3 km / 2 mi. WSW), Cecelia (3 km / 2 mi. WNW), and Lupçi i poshtëm (3 km / 2 mi. NNE).
