= Ribarići, Karlovac County =

Settlement in Karlovac County, Croatia

Ribarići
- Settlement
- Interactive map of Ribarići
- Location of Ribarići in Croatia
- Coordinates: 45°12′40″N 15°13′55″E
- Country: Croatia
- County: Karlovac County
- City: Ogulin

Area
  - Total: 2.7 km^{2} (1.0 sq mi)

Population (2021)
  - Total: 285
  - Density: 110/km^{2} (270/sq mi)
- Time zone: UTC+1 (CET)
  - Summer (DST): UTC+2 (CEST)
- Postal code: 47300 Ogulin
- Area code: +385 (0)47

Ribarići is a settlement in the City of Ogulin in Croatia. In 2021, its population was 285.

== Demographics ==
Ribarići: Population trends 1857–2021
v

population	134			131	132	156	122	162	206	203	207	146			312	337	285
	1857	1869	1880	1890	1900	1910	1921	1931	1948	1953	1961	1971	1981	1991	2001	2011	2021

Sources: Croatian Bureau of Statistics publications

== Bibliography ==
=== History ===
- Lopašić, Radoslav (1894). "Urbar Modruški od g. 1486" [The Modruš Urbarium of the Year 1486]. Hrvatski urbari. Monumenta historico-iuridica Slavorum meridionalium (in Croatian). Vol. 5, 1. pp. 20–81.
  - Republished: Lopašić, Radoslav (1997). Abramović, Ignacije (ed.). Urbar modruški [The Modruš Urbarium] (in Croatian). Ogulin: Ogranak Matice hrvatske. ISBN 953-96393-4-4. Tirage: 500.
