= Ribari, Šabac =

Ribari Рибари (Serbian)
- Town
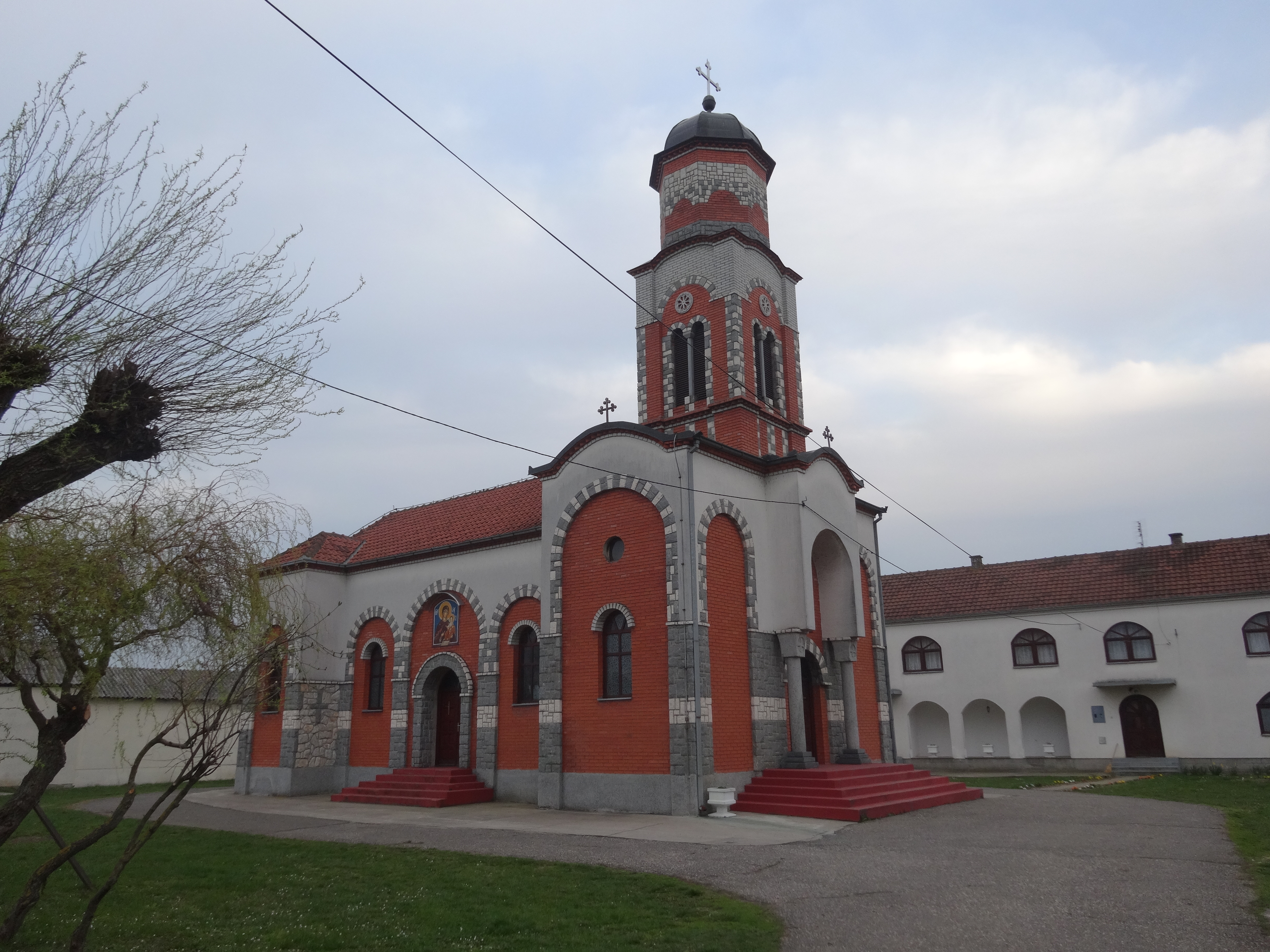

- Location within Serbia
- Coordinates: 44°42′36″N 19°25′26″E
- Country: Serbia
- District: Mačva District
- Municipality: Šabac

Population (2002)
  - Total: 2,131
- Time zone: UTC+1 (CET)
  - Summer (DST): UTC+2 (CEST)

Ribari (Serbian Cyrillic: Рибари) is a town in the municipality of Šabac, Serbia. According to the 2002 census, the town has a population of 2131 people. The village has a Serb ethnic majority.
