= Zagóra =

Zagóra may refer to the following places:

- Zagóra, Gmina Bełżec in Lublin Voivodeship (east Poland)
- Zagóra, Gmina Susiec in Lublin Voivodeship (east Poland)
- Zagóra, Włodawa County in Lublin Voivodeship (east Poland)
- Zagóra, Zamość County in Lublin Voivodeship (east Poland)
- Zagóra, Subcarpathian Voivodeship (south-east Poland)
- Zagóra, Lubusz Voivodeship (west Poland)
