= Gornje Dubrave =

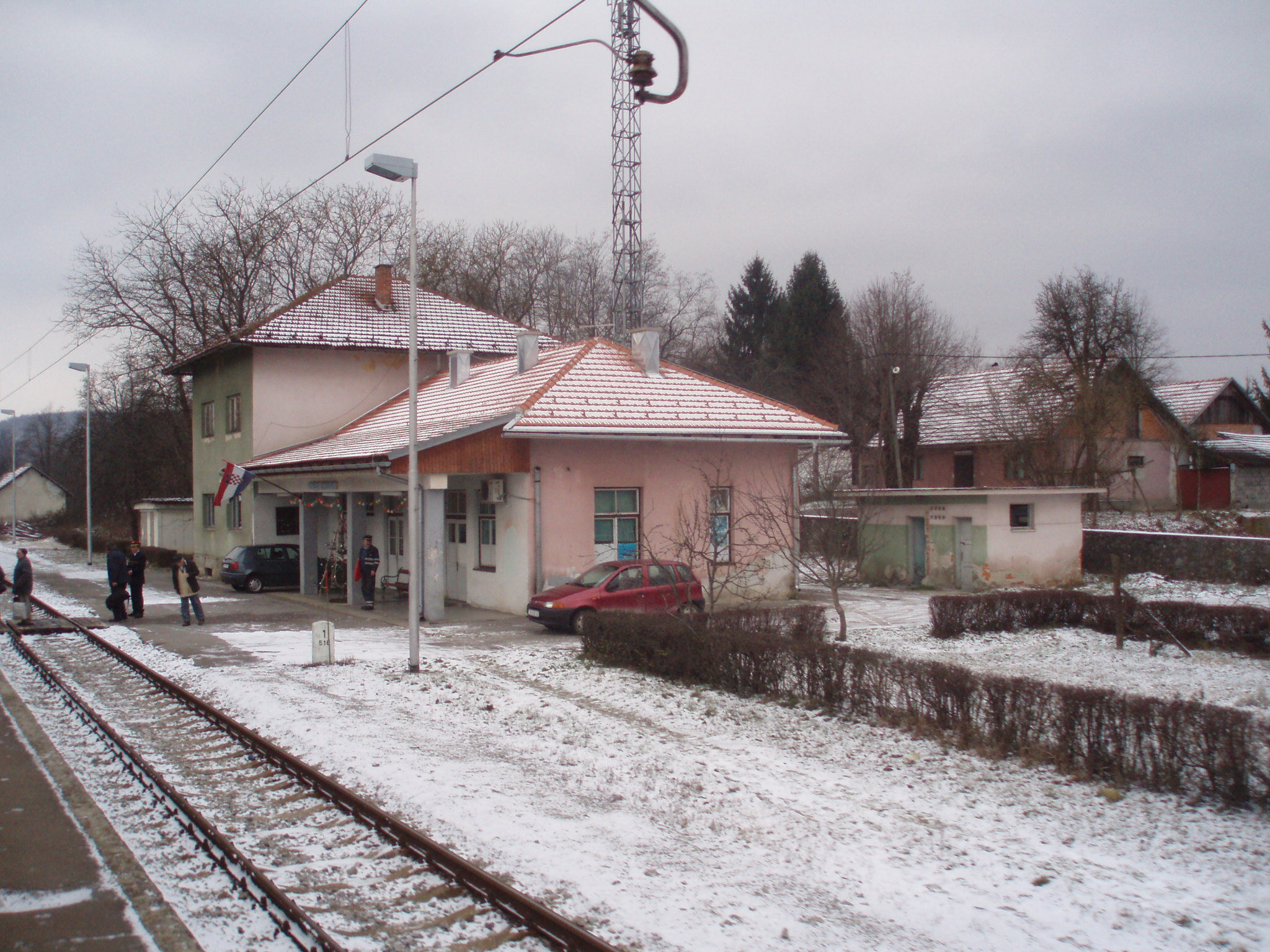
- Gornje Dubrave railway station

- Location within Croatia
- Coordinates: 45°18′29″N 15°18′18″E
- Country: Croatia
- County: Karlovac
- City: Ogulin

Area
  - Total: 22.6 km^{2} (8.7 sq mi)

Population (2021)
  - Total: 63
  - Density: 2.8/km^{2} (7.2/sq mi)
- Time zone: UTC+1 (CET)
  - Summer (DST): UTC+2 (CEST)

Gornje Dubrave is a village in Karlovac County, Croatia. It is located in the municipality of Ogulin.

== History ==
=== WWII ===
==== 1941 ====
On 23 May 1941, the Ustaše raided Gornje Dubrave and carried away 29 of its residents, including the priest, railway workers, farmers, teachers and the innkeeper. Only a male and female teacher ever returned. The female teacher was raped in the Ogulin castle and was subsequently sent off to the Psychiatric Hospital "Sveti Ivan" in Stenjevec.

In June 1941, all Serbs employed in Gornje Dubrave received the news from the kotar administration at Ogulin that they were fired. These Serbian employees had been the ones to relay to Dubrave the message to turn in their Yugoslav military uniforms and arms, which only a minority, for example Lazo Janjanin, actually did. In their stead, Croats were hired: a local Croat, Franjo Stipetić, became the new municipal president (Croatian: općinski načelnik), while one from Posavina was chosen as the new notary.

After the mass arrests began, the father of railway worker Miloš Zatezalo fled to the GMS for safety, remaining there the entire war, leaving his wife and children behind.

In late June or early July 1941, the priest in Gornje Dubrave was arrested. In early July, he had not yet been sent away. As of a 15 July document, all he had been sent to a concentration camp.

A 2 July was issued order for all Velike župe, including that of Modruš (with seat in Ogulin), to make room for 2500 Slovenes each, who were to occupy the homes of 2500 Serbs, to be deported to the GMS, prioritising businessmen and merchants. Gornje Dubrave was to accommodate 350 Slovenes. As of mid-July, there were not enough empty Serb homes to accommodate the exchange.

On 30 July, 16 Serb villagers of Gornje Dubrave were arrested at the market in Ogulin, having come there to sell. Beginning with the next market on 6 August, the Serbs stopped coming out of fear that it would happen a third time.

==== 1942 ====
At 10:00 on 24 February 1942, a group of about 300 "Communists" with automatic weapons arrived in the area of Ogulin and above Hreljin and Kučaj. Until 14:00, they blocked the road to Ogulin, after which they retreated to Gomirje. For 3–4 days they appeared from time to time in the area of Ogulin, Hreljin, Vrbovsko and Gomirje, then Gornje Dubrave, Gomirje and Jasenak.

At 14:42 on 19 June, a freight train with an Italian military guard carrying 26 cisterns and 1 flour wagon between Gornje Dubrave and Zdenac hit an extracted track, derailing as a result. The wagon loaded with flour caught on fire, partly burned and partly carried away by Partisans of the 1st battalion of the Second Kordun Detachment who had laid the barrier. The Partisans shot up the cisterns, which were later plugged up in Gornje Dubrave. Traffic on the line was stopped, and one Italian soldier was killed. The conductor and two fuellers were taken by the Partisans, and their fate remained unknown.

On 8 July 1942, a train derailed between Donje and Gornje Dubrave was derailed by a section of destroyed track, destroying both its locomotives. The armoured train could not come to its assistance because on the same day, another passenger train was derailed between Generalski Stol and Donje Dubrave. Partisans emptied 2 wagons. Among the dead there were 2 Ustaše, while the fate of another officer and soldier who had been on board remained unknown.

On the 15th, a Partisan attack on the railway station was repelled.

== Demographics ==
In 1895, the obćina of Dubrave (court at Gornje Dubrave), with an area of 96 square kilometres (37 mi^{2}), belonged to the kotar of Ogulin (Ogulin court and electoral district) in the županija of Modruš-Rieka (Ogulin high court and financial board). There were 568 houses, with a population of 3748. Its 27 villages and 19 hamlets were divided for taxation purposes into 4 porezne obćine, under the Ogulin office.

Village of Gornje Dubrave: Population trends 1857–2021
v

population	1766	1907	1145	872	851	786	687	816	430	432	349	287	211	147	119	90	63
	1857	1869	1880	1890	1900	1910	1921	1931	1948	1953	1961	1971	1981	1991	2001	2011	2021

Note:Naselja pod imenom Donje Dubrave i Gornje Dubrave iskazuju se od 1880. U 1857. i 1869. iskazano je naselje pod imenom Dubrave. Za to bivše naselje sadrži podatke u 1857. i 1869., kao i dio podataka za naselje Trošmarija od 1857. do 1880. U 2001. povećano za područje naselja Janjani, Mikašinovići, Perići, Višnjić Brdo i Vucelići koja su prestala postojati. Za ta bivša naselja sadrži podatke od 1890. do 1991. Sources: Croatian Bureau of Statistics publications

== Bibliography ==
- Trgo, Fabijan, ed. (1964). Zbornik dokumenata i podataka o Narodno-oslobodilačkom ratu Jugoslovenskih naroda. Vol. V, 32.
