= Gornje Zagorje =

Settlement in Karlovac County, Croatia

- Settlement
- Interactive map of Gornje Zagorje
- Location of Gornje Zagorje in Croatia
- Coordinates: 45°10′59″N 15°14′13″E
- Country: Croatia
- County: Karlovac County
- City: Ogulin

Area
  - Total: 6.2 km^{2} (2.4 sq mi)

Population (2021)
  - Total: 270
  - Density: 44/km^{2} (110/sq mi)
- Time zone: UTC+1 (CET)
  - Summer (DST): UTC+2 (CEST)
- Postal code: 47300 Ogulin
- Area code: +385 (0)47

Gornje Zagorje is a settlement in the City of Ogulin in Croatia. In 2021, its population was 270.

== Demographics ==
Gornje Zagorje: Population trends 1857–2021
v

population	303	386	406	441	475	456	419	430	652	525	442	421	464	415	325	297	270
	1857	1869	1880	1890	1900	1910	1921	1931	1948	1953	1961	1971	1981	1991	2001	2011	2021

Sources: Croatian Bureau of Statistics publications
