= Generalski Stol =

- Location within Croatia
- Coordinates: 45°20′24″N 15°22′48″E
- Country: Croatia
- County: Karlovac County

Area
  - Total: 100.0 km^{2} (38.6 sq mi)

Population (2021)
  - Total: 2,171
  - Density: 21.71/km^{2} (56.23/sq mi)
- Time zone: UTC+1 (CET)
  - Summer (DST): UTC+2 (CEST)
- Website: generalski-stol.hr

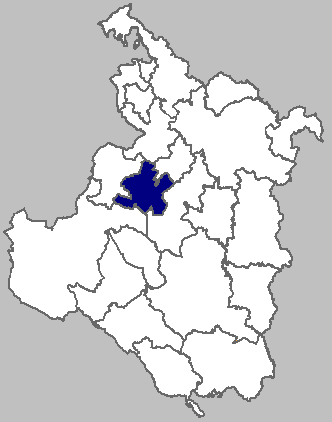
Image of Generalski Stol municipality within Karlovac County

Generalski Stol is a village and a municipality in Karlovac County, Croatia.

== Name ==
Generalski Stol played a historically important role in defending Croatia and western Europe by preventing Ottoman incursions further west. The settlement's name (literally, "the General's Table") is a reference to the generals that planned their defense strategy here.

== History ==
A 2 July 1941 order was made for all Velike župe, including that of Modruš (with seat in Ogulin), to make room for 2500 Slovenes each, who were to occupy the homes of 2500 Serbs, to be deported to the GMS, prioritising businessmen and merchants. In connection with these measures, the kotarski predstojnik of Ogulin planned to settle 2 Slovene merchants in Generalski Stol to replace the Serb merchants. As of mid-July, there were not enough empty Serb homes to accommodate the exchange.

On 5 July 1942, an armoured train leaving Generalski Stol came across a destroyed section and 2 wagons derailed. The track was quickly repaired. Another train derailed on the 8th between Generalski Stol and Donje Dubrave, resulting in the destruction of 3 wagons and 2 locomotives. On the 10th, another passenger train was derailed between Generalski Stol and Donje Dubrave in part to block the armoured train from arriving to aid the train derailed the same day between Gornje and Donje Dubrave. Partisans emptied 2 wagons. Among the dead there were 2 Ustaše, while the fate of another officer and soldier who had been on board remained unknown.

== Demographics ==
In 1895, the obćina of Generalski Stol (court at Generalski Stol), with an area of 55 square kilometres (21 mi^{2}), belonged to the kotar of Ogulin (Ogulin court and electoral district except Mateško Selo which fell under Vojnić electoral district) in the županija of Modruš-Rieka (Ogulin high court and financial board). There were 417 houses, with a population of 2742. Its 11 villages and 17 hamlets were divided for taxation purposes into 3 porezne obćine, under the Ogulin office.

In the 2011 census, there were 2,642 inhabitants, in the following settlements:

- Brcković Draga, population 30
- Crno Kamanje, population 16
- Dobrenići, population 305
- Donje Bukovlje, population 98
- Duga Gora, population 61
- Erdelj, population 369
- Generalski Stol, population 589
- Goričice Dobranske, population 47
- Gorinci, population 91
- Gornje Bukovlje, population 232
- Gornji Zvečaj, population 187
- Gradišće, population 53
- Jankovo Selište, population 77
- Keići, population 40
- Lipa, population 39
- Lipov Pesak, population 36
- Mateško Selo, population 35
- Mrežnički Brest, population 41
- Petrunići, population 20
- Protulipa, population 51
- Radočaji, population 77
- Sarovo, population 11
- Skukani, population 56
- Tomašići, population 68
- Trnovo, population 13

In the same census, 99% were Croats.

== Governance ==
On 1 January 1893, Mateško Selo was annexed by Generalski Stol obćina, having formerly been under Perjasica obćina.

== Infrastructure ==
In 1913, there were 8 gendarmeries in Delnice kotar: Ogulin, Drežnica, Generalski Stol, Jasenak, Saborsko, Josipdol, Modruš and Plaški.

== Bibliography ==
- Trgo, Fabijan, ed. (1964). Zbornik dokumenata i podataka o Narodno-oslobodilačkom ratu Jugoslovenskih naroda. Vol. V, 32.
