= Bukovník =

- Municipality
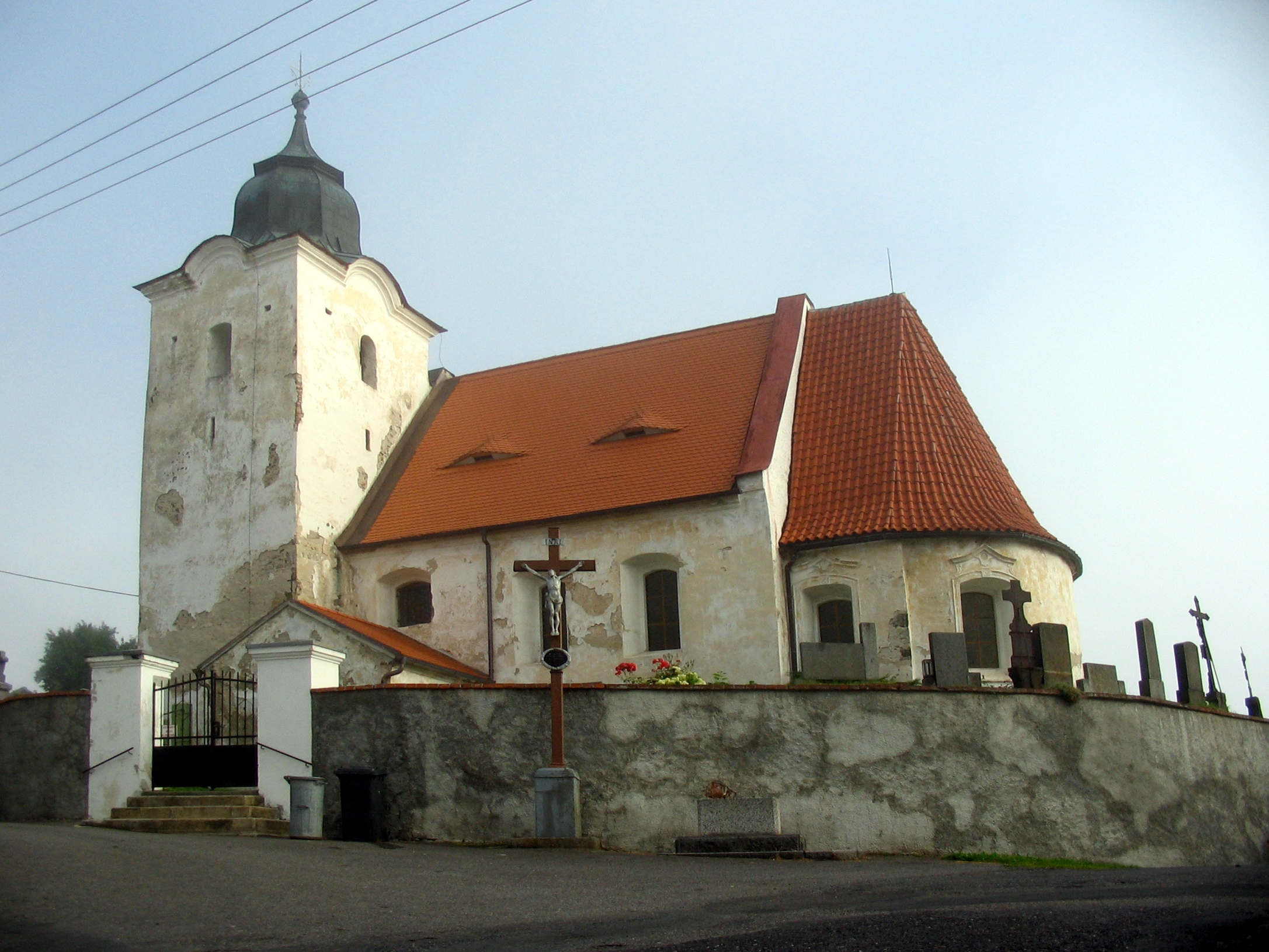
- Church of Saint Wenceslaus

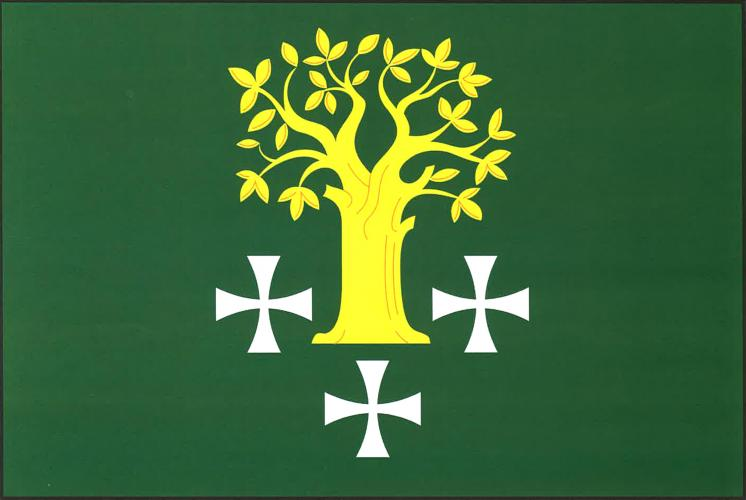
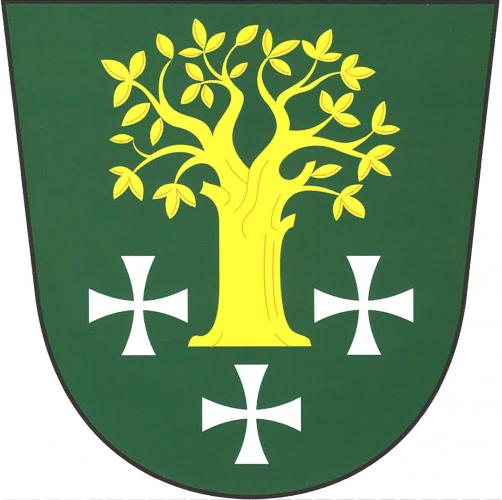
- Flag Coat of arms

- Location in the Czech Republic
- Coordinates: 49°13′21″N 13°39′41″E
- Country: Czech Republic
- Region: Plzeň
- District: Klatovy
- First mentioned: 1251

Area
  - Total: 4.09 km^{2} (1.58 sq mi)
- Elevation: 615 m (2,018 ft)

Population (2026-01-01)
  - Total: 67
  - Density: 16/km^{2} (42/sq mi)
- Time zone: UTC+1 (CET)
  - Summer (DST): UTC+2 (CEST)
- Postal code: 342 01
- Website: www.bukovnik.cz

Bukovník is a municipality and village in Klatovy District in the Plzeň Region of the Czech Republic. It has about 70 inhabitants.

Bukovník lies approximately 34 kilometres (21 mi) southeast of Klatovy, 63 km (39 mi) south of Plzeň, and 111 km (69 mi) southwest of Prague.

== Demographics ==
Historical population
Year	Pop.	±%
1869	347	—
1880	357	+2.9%
1890	385	+7.8%
1900	390	+1.3%
1910	386	−1.0%
1921	325	−15.8%
1930	275	−15.4%
1950	170	−38.2%
1961	171	+0.6%
1970	126	−26.3%
1980	121	−4.0%
1991	98	−19.0%
2001	72	−26.5%
2011	78	+8.3%
2021	57	−26.9%
Source: Censuses
