= Ribarice =

Ribarice Рибарице (Serbian)
- Village (Selo)
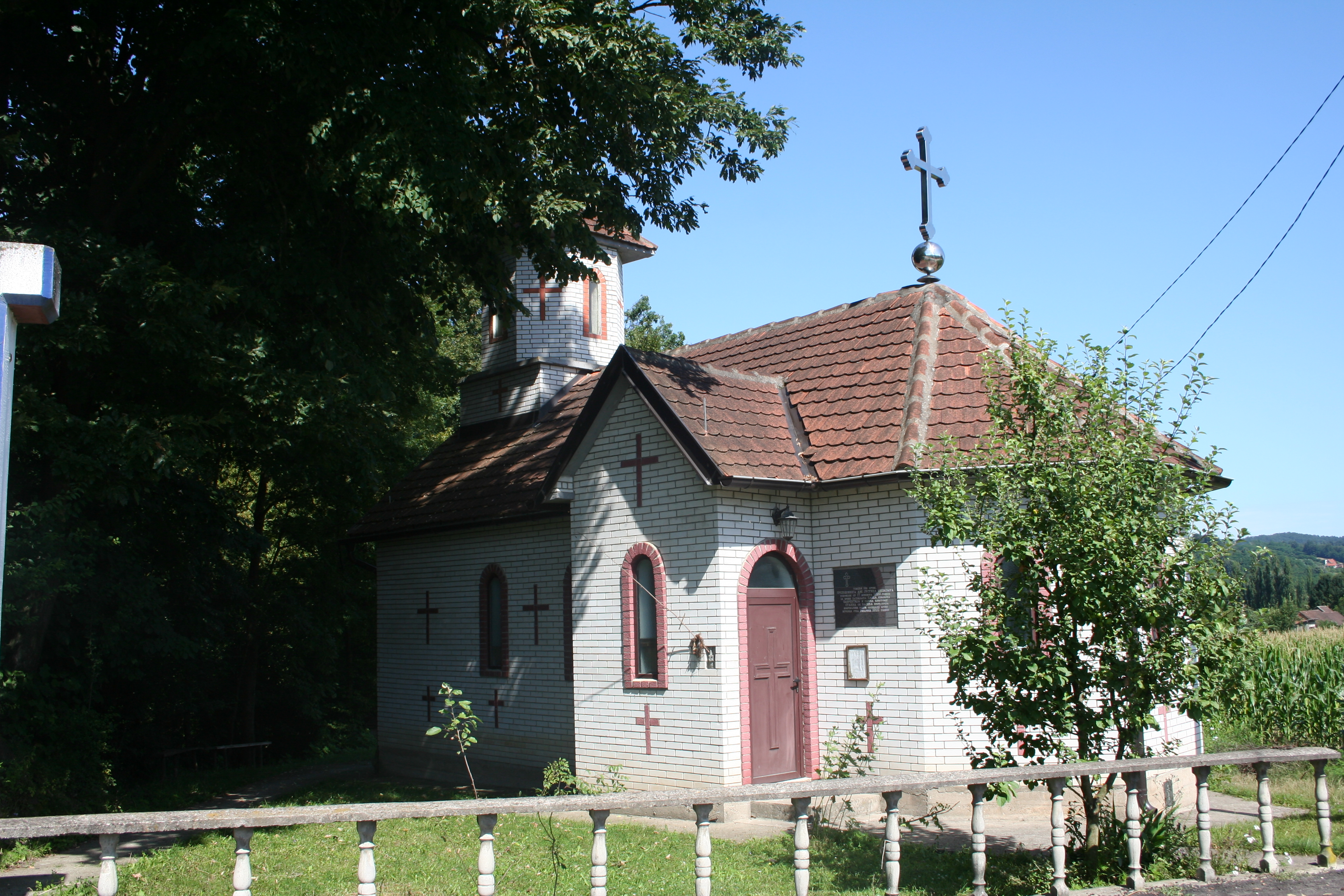

- Location within Serbia
- Coordinates: 44°33′N 19°27′E
- Country: Serbia
- District: Mačva District
- Municipality: Loznica

Population (2002)
  - Total: 407
- Time zone: UTC+1 (CET)
  - Summer (DST): UTC+2 (CEST)

Ribarice (Serbian Cyrillic: Рибарице) is a village in the municipality of Loznica, Serbia. According to the 2002 census, the village has a population of 407 people.
