= Siege of Sokolac =

1493 siege of Sokolac castle

- Part of Conflict between Frankopans and royal authority
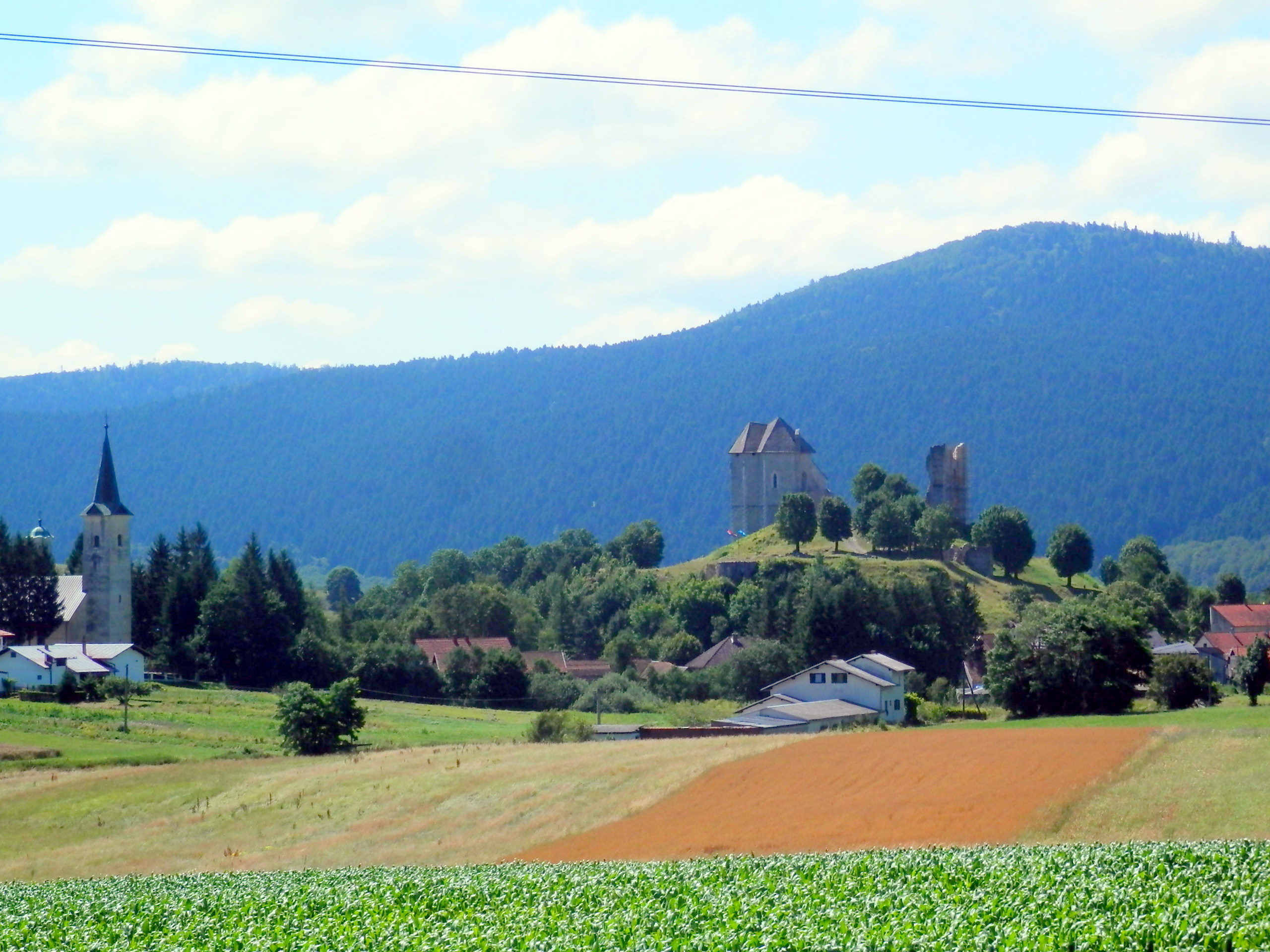
- Present day view of Sokolac Castle
Date	August 1493
Location	Brinje, Kingdom of Croatia
Result	Ivan Both killed; Siege abandoned

Belligerents
Bans of Croatia	Frankopan noble family

Commanders and leaders
Emerik Derenčin Ivan Both of Bajna †	Anž Frankopan

Strength
4,000 horsemen 2,000 infantry	Unknown

Casualties and losses
At least one	Unknown

The siege of Sokolac was a siege of Sokolac Castle in Brinje, Kingdom of Croatia, in August 1493, by the joint bans of Croatia John Both de Bajna and Emerik Derenčin, against the Frankopan family, due to the Frankopans' attempt to regain control over the town of Senj. John Both was killed during the siege, and it was eventually abandoned after Derenčin received news of an approaching Ottoman army. The two sides made truce, and fought the Ottomans together at the Battle of Krbava Field the following month.

== Background ==
After the death of Hungarian king Matthias Corvinus, the Frankopan noble family attempted to reassert their control over the town of Senj. The Hungarian king earlier confiscated this town from them in order to form a Senj capitancy whose objective was to defend the region from both the Ottomans and Venice. In spite of Frankopan's attempts to take the city, the citizens of Senj themselves did not want to come under Frankopan rule, for which they complained to the pope, as well as the king, who promised them help. Emerik Derenčin and Ivan both were soon appointed bans of Croatia, with the task of deterring Frankopans from taking Senj.

== Siege ==
Upon learning that the ban's army was on its way to relieve Senj, Frankopans cancelled their attempts to take Senj and withdrew to their castle of Sokolac. Two Croatian bans came after them to Sokolac. As the bans were inspecting around the castle to find weak spots in its walls, both approached too close to the castle walls and got struck by gunfire which killed them. Both of their deaths enraged other commanders, who decided to undertake a much larger siege and ordered construction of siege engines.

== Leaving the siege ==
In the meantime, Derenčin received information that an Ottoman army entered Croatian lands. Ottoman sources also claim that Anž Frankopan invited the Ottomans to Croatia, because the ban's army ravaged his possessions. Derenčin therefore quickly made peace with most of the Frankopans (except for Anž Frankopan), so they could together confront the Ottoman army. The events that followed led to the Battle of Krbava field.

== See also ==
- Battle of Krbava Field
