= Burchard-Bélaváry family =

Artistocratic family

House of Both
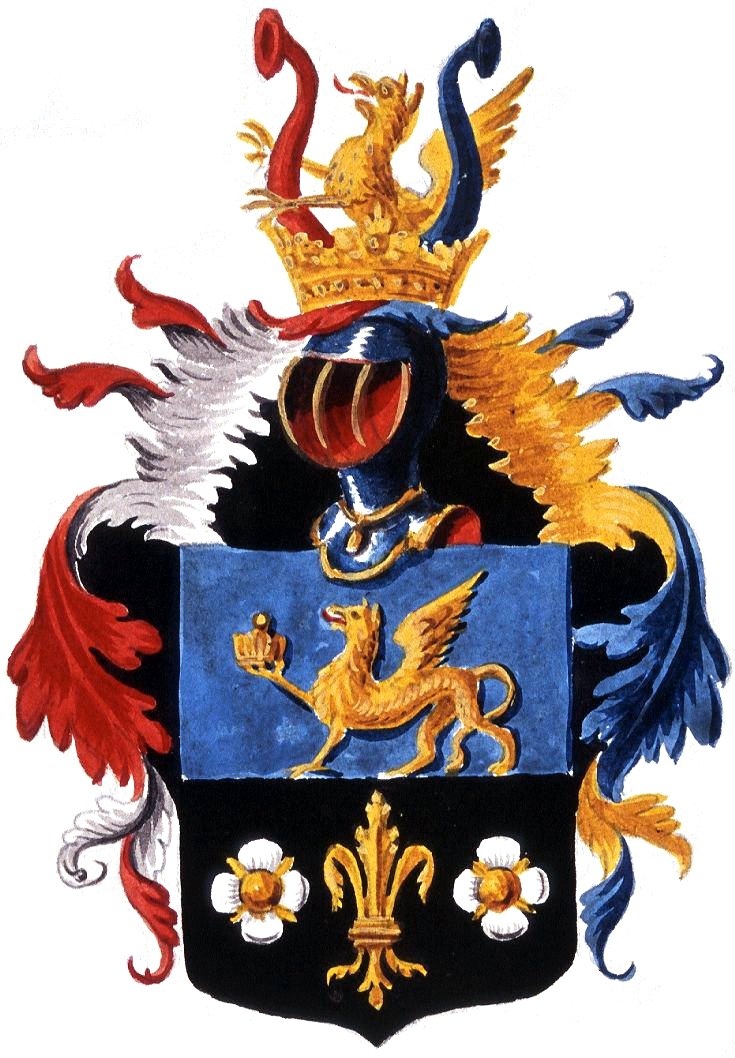
- Parent house: Both family
- Country: Kingdom of Hungary
- Founded: 15th century

The Burchard-Bélaváry family (Szikavai és Bélaváry Both/Burchard in Hungarian; Burchard von Bellawary de Sycava in German) is an aristocratic family of Hungarian origin who gave many personalities. Its comes from the Both de Bajna branch of the Both family, family Magnates of Hungary whose records date back to 1282. Its name was originally Both de Szikava et Bélavár.

== Members ==
- Johann I Burchart von Bélaváry (1546-1616), who gave a famous dynasty of pharmacists in Tallinn, in Estonia, in the Raeapteek (from Johann I. to Johann X.; 1582 – 1911).
- György Both de Szikava et Bélavár († 1588), magistrate (udvarbíró), governor of fortresses (várnagy) including the Devín Castle.
- Dávid Bélaváry de Szikava (ca. 1580), diplomat and high official of the Kingdom of Hungary.
- Miklós Bélavary, son of Dávid, Grand Treasurer of Upper Hungary (1655), military governor of Upper Hungary (1666). Blood court (1655).
- Dávid Belleváry II, grandson of David and son of Miklós. Officer in the Chamber of Kassa, collecting royal taxes (tricesimator in Latin) and Imperial Commissioner (császárí Biztos in Hungarian), he became later a kuruc hero in the Rákóczi's War of Independence (1703–1711).
- Gottlieb Johann (aka Ivan) Burchard von Bélaváry (1756-1825), Lord of Brandten, Russian commander, Husband of Augusta von Knorring (1750-1823), sister of generals baron Gotthard Johann von Knorring and Karl von Knorring.
- Gottlieb II Burchard von Bélaváry (1757-1807), killed as Russian commander (major) at Oczakov during the Russo-Turkish War (1806–1812). Son of Gottlieb (1721-1759), lord of Munnalas, councilor of Tallinn and Elder of the Great Guild and of Dorothé von zur Mühlen (1726-1776), daughter of the mayor of Tallinn.
- Johann Conrad Burchard von Bélaváry (1777–1871), Russian commander (major), knight of the Order of St. George.
- Fromhold Johann Burchard-Bélaváry (1777°), captain 1st rank (1830) in the Imperial Russian Navy, knight of the orders of Saint Vladimir and St. George.
- Jan Konrad Burchard (1748, Tallinn- 1828, Poland), captain of the Warsaw militia, diplomat, captain-aide-de-camp of general Kościuszko (1794), pharmacist in Warsaw and Radom, mayor of Radom. Integrated into the Polish nobility within the Jastrzębiec clan (1790).
- Konrád Bélaváry de Sikava (18th century – 19th century), General, governor of Nubia, his was an Ottoman pasha.
- Konrád Burchard-Bélaváry (1837–1916), member of the hungarian House of Magnates, business magnate consul general of Brazilia in Budapest.
- Rudolf/Rezsö von Burchard-Bélavary (1870 -), son of Konrad. PhD in economics and political science, business magnate and Councillor and Chef de service to the Ministry of the Interior (miniszteri titkár).
- Andor Burchard-Bélaváry (1880–1947). PhD in economics and political science, businessman, he has the title of Senior Councillor of the Government (kormányfőtanácsos).
- Julius-Konrad Gyula Burchard-Bélaváry (1820–1917), mining engineer, captain of Hussar during the Hungarian Revolution in 1848, he was next to his friend general count Henryk Dembiński. He later became the CEO of the French champagne Delbeck and president of the Union of Great Brands (Syndicat de Grandes Marques), in Reims.
- István Burchard-Bélaváry (1864–1933), artist.
- Marcel Burchard-Bélaváry (1864–1914), French commandant, writer, he is killed in the beginnings of the First World War. Knight of the Legion of Honour.

== Gallery ==
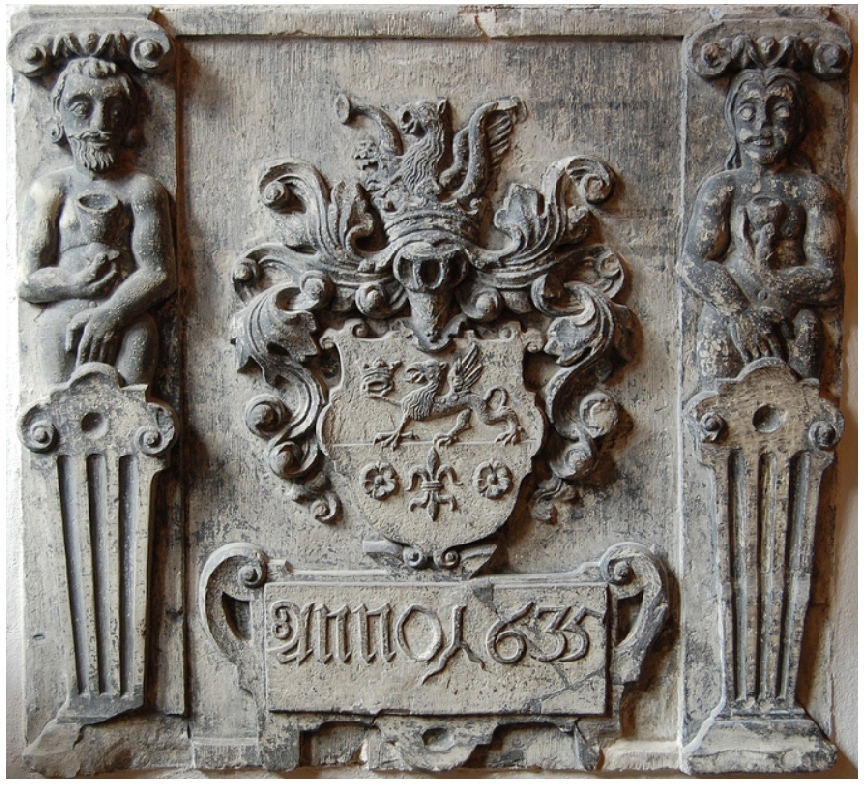
Coat of arms of the family in the Raeapteek, Tallinn (1635)

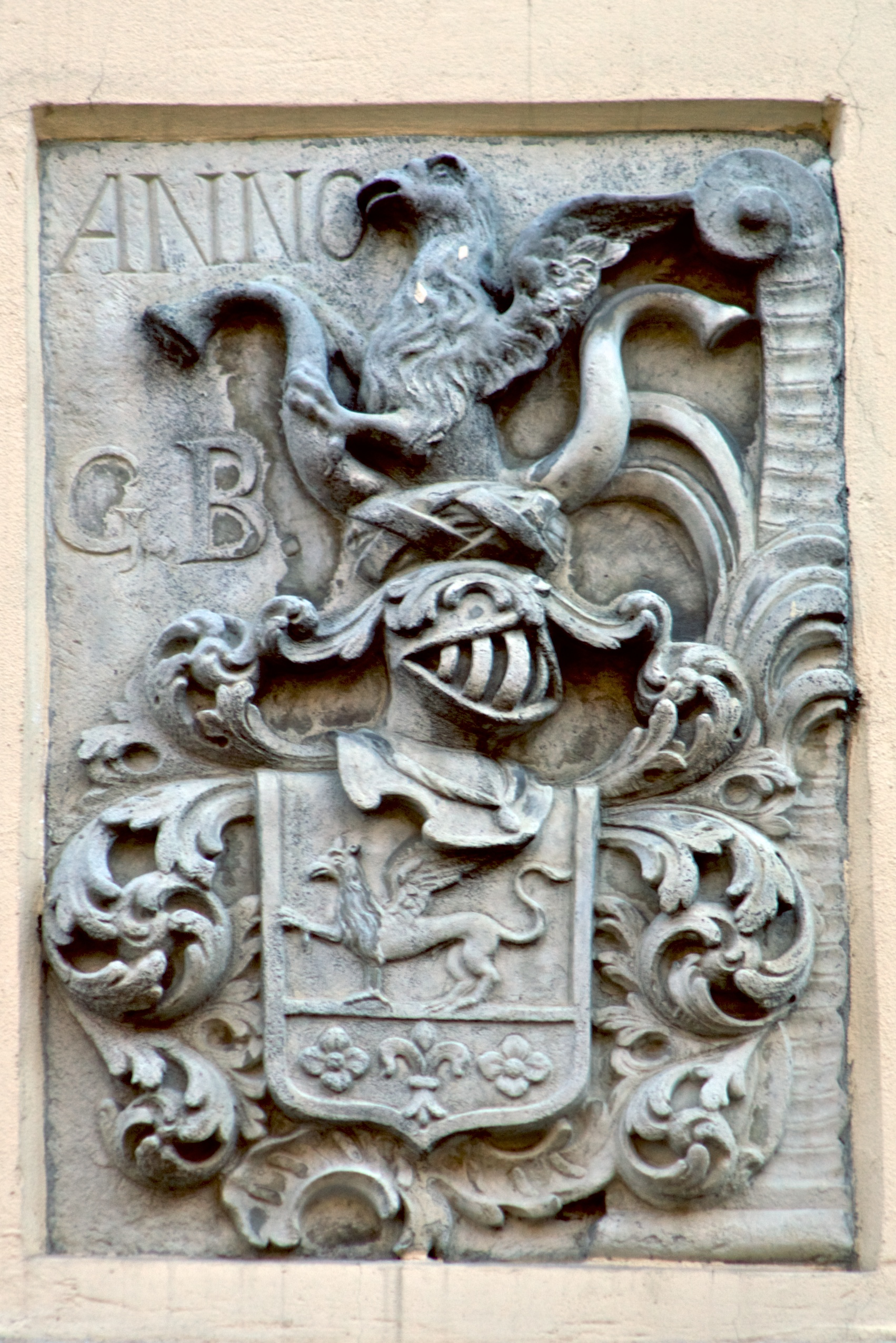
Coat of arms of Gottlieb Bellawary (1721-1759) on the front of the Brotherhood of Blackheads, Tallinn

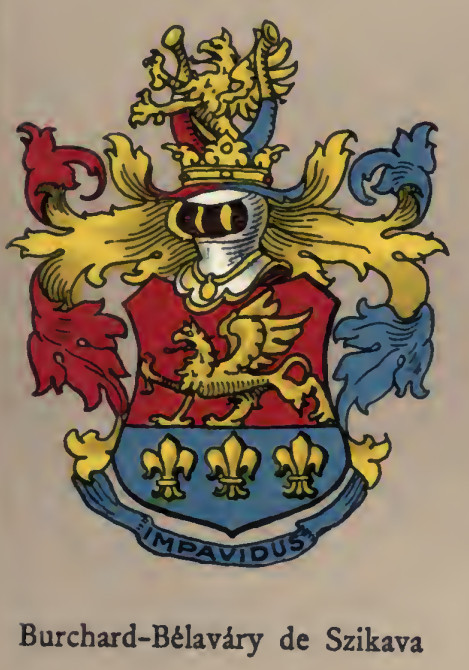

== See also ==
- Nobility and royalty of the Kingdom of Hungary
- Hungarian heraldry
- Austria-Hungary

== Sources ==
- Magyar Heraldikai és Geneológiai Társaság, Budapest, 1894, 1899, 1901, 1902, 1926
- Récits de famille, Histoire de la Famille Burchard-Bélavàry, by Cdt Marcel Burchard-Bélavary, Berger-Levrault et Cie, Nancy, 1906; La Hulpe, Bruxelles, 2001
- A Bothfalvi B. -család címere by Meliorisz B., Turul, 1901 (netlexicon.hu)
- Nagykanizsa – Romlottvár, by George Szekér dipl. Architecte, 2007, Budapest
- The Business Strategy of Fathers and Sons:A Hungarian Family in the 19th and 20th Centuries, Klement Judit, ed. in AETAS – Journal of history and related disciplines (1-2/2005) pdf
