= Lipice =

Lipice may refer to:

- Lipice, Croatia, a village in the region of Lika.
- Lipice, Poland, a village in west-central Poland.
- Lipice, Czech Republic, an area in the town of Pelhřimov.
