= Johann Burchart =

Pharmacist of Tallinn, Estonia

Johannes Burchart I (1546–1616), born János Both Bélaváry de Szikava (Hungarian: Szikavai és Bélaváry Both János), was a pharmacist and druggist and the first of a line of doctors and pharmacists who owned the Raeapteek in Reval (Tallinn, Estonia), from 1582 to 1911. He also owned large lande estates and the manors of Haabneeme and Vanamõisa in northern Estonia.

== Biography ==
He was born in Pozsony in the Kingdom of Hungary, son of Ambrose, where his ancestors were lords and barons of the kingdom of Hungary, including John Both de Bajna (d. 1493), ban of Croatia.

János (Johann) left the kingdom of Hungary after the Battle of Kerelőszentpál in 1575, after which Stephen Báthory ascended the throne of Transylvania and proscribed supporters of Gáspár Bekes. He took refuge successively in Salzburg (1575-1578) and Munich (1578-1580), then went to Jelgava in Latvia, and finally settled in Tallinn, then in the kingdom of Sweden, in 1580 under the name Burchart. With the permission of the Council of Tallinn, he became on 30 April 1583 the official pharmacist of the city by taking over the Raeapteek, founded by the city in around 1420.

He married Anna von Kampferbeck (d. 1603), daughter of Johann (d. 1562), counselor then Mayor of Tallinn, and granddaughter of Heinrich von Dellingshausen (d. 1525), alderman of Tallinn (1508-1511). His name, Johannes, was given to the eldest son of each succeeding generation, down to Johann Burchart X.

== Sources ==
- Peeter Tarvel, Eesti biograafilise lesikoi täiendusköide, Kirjastus osaühing "Loodus", 1940
- Gustavson. H., Tallinna vanadest apteekidest. Tallinn 1972 sur raeapteek.ee
- Sitiniisberiekte, 1912, Riga, 1914
