= Raeapteek =

One of Europe's longest-lived pharmacies

Coordinates: 59°26′16.1″N 24°44′45.64″E

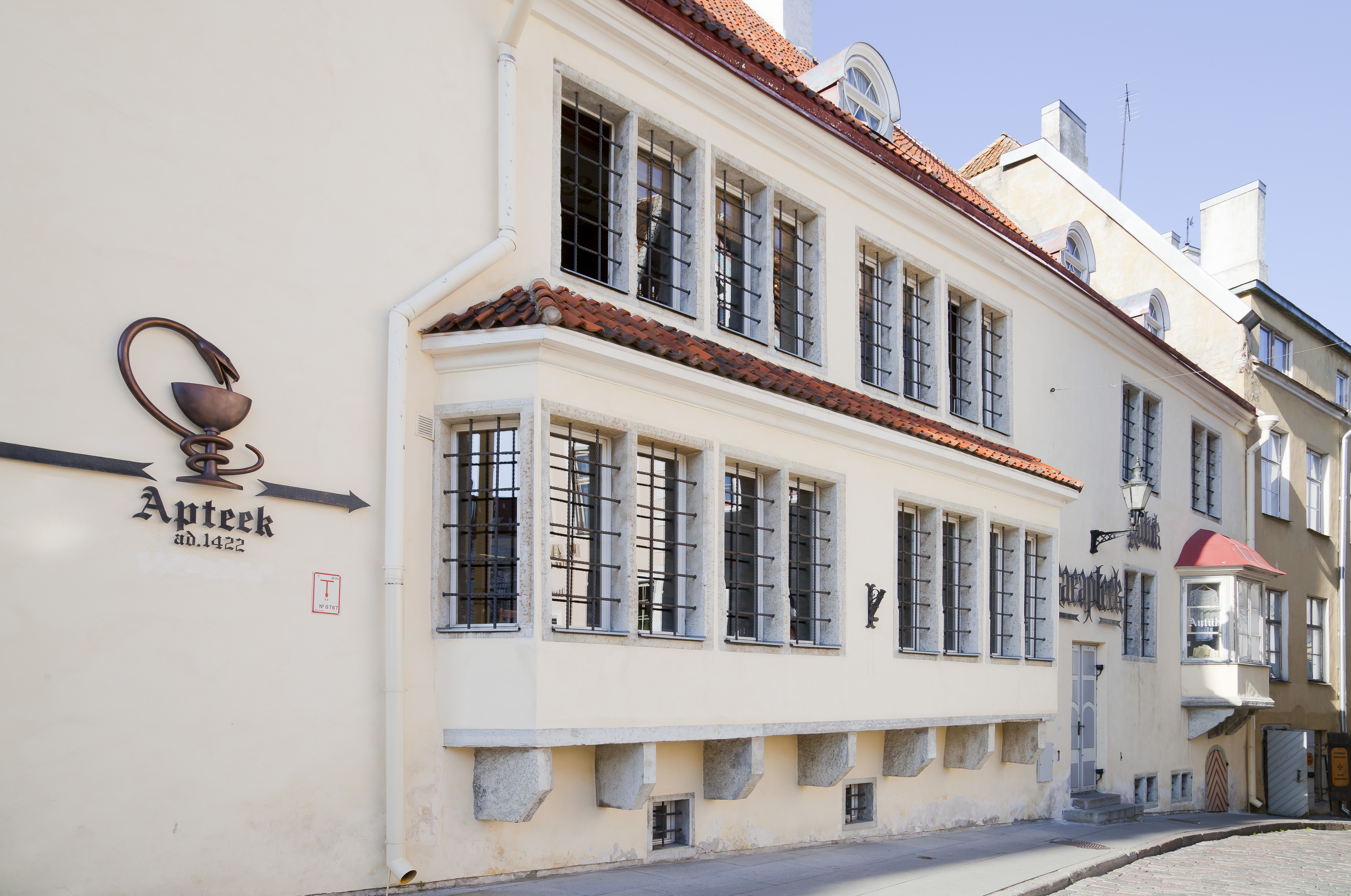
The Raeapteek

The Raeapteek (English: Town Hall Pharmacy; German: Ratsapotheke) is a pharmacy in the center of Tallinn, Estonia.

Opposite the Tallinn Town Hall, at 11 Raekoja plats, it is one of the oldest continuously running pharmacies in Europe, having always been in business in the same house since the early 15th century. It is also the oldest commercial enterprise and the oldest medical establishment in Tallinn.

The first known image of the Town Hall Pharmacy is an oil painting by Gustav Adolph Oldekop, showing Tallinn's Town Hall Square in 1800. The first photos of the building date from 1889.

== History ==
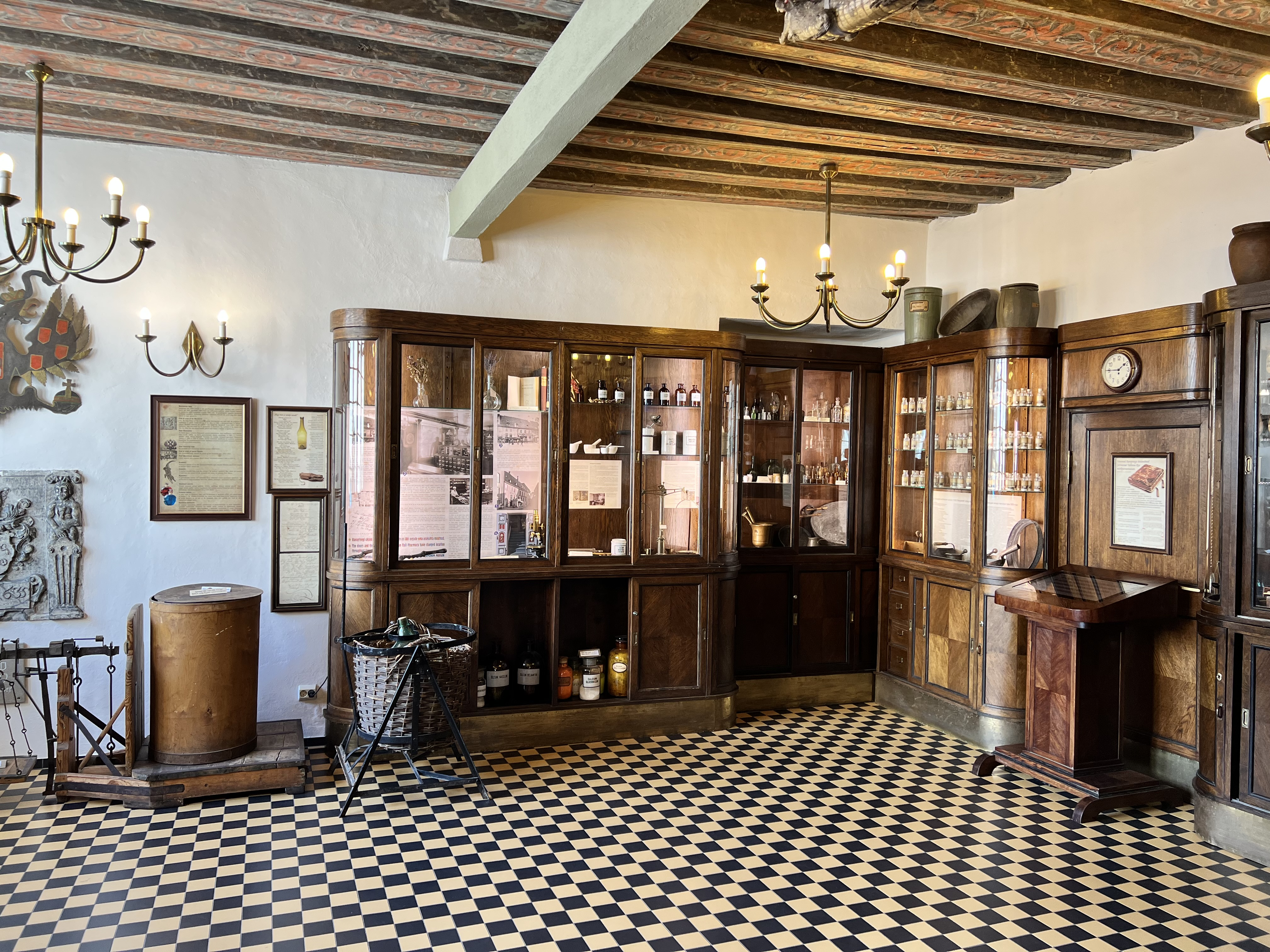
Interior of Raeapteek

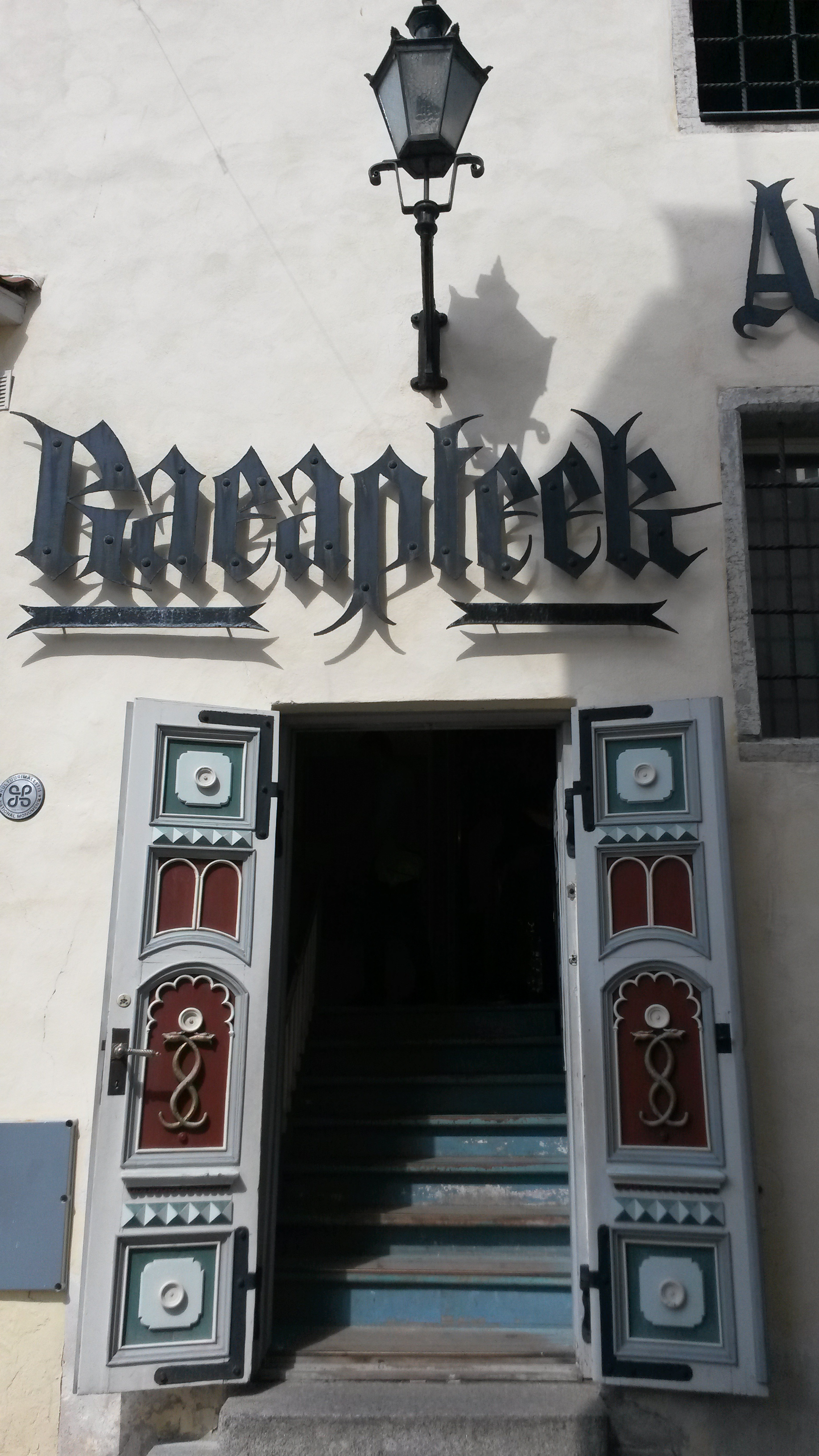
Entrance of Raeapteek

Historians have not been able to determine when exactly the pharmacy opened, but the oldest records available show that the Raeapteek was already on its third owner in 1422. Some scholars consider the opening year to be 1415.

In a town council's notebook, there is an entry by a chemist named Nuclawes who stated that the owners of the pharmacy are 10 honourable men, the majority of whom are aldermen. Other documents dated after 1422 refer that the first chemist here was Johann Molner and that medicines were already being sold at the pharmacy in the second half of the 15th century.

=== The Burchart (Burchard) family: 1582–1911 ===
The Burchart (Burchard) family are those most closely associated with the pharmacy's history, having run the business for over 10 generations, spanning over 325 years from around 1582 to 1911.

Between 1579 and 1581, a Hungarian immigrant named Johann Burchart Both Belavary de Sykava, moved to Tallinn from his hometown of Pressburg (present day Bratislava) and obtained a lease from the city council to run the business of the pharmacy. He was to be the first in a long dynasty of pharmacists that were to run the Raeapteek.

He also started the family tradition of giving the firstborn son the name "Johann" who was always expected to carry on the family business. This tradition was carried on for eight further generations, until the late 19th century with the birth of the tenth firstborn son in 1843 called Johann X Burchart.

The Burcharts were well-educated and often were not only pharmacists but also doctors. They played a significant role in the life of the town.

In 1688, Johann Burchart the IV finally was able to purchase the pharmacy from the city council for 600 thalers. In 1690, the Burchart dynasty and Town Hall Apothecary's rights and obligations were confirmed with a privilege written by the ruling king Charles XI of Sweden.

In 1710, Johann Burchart V started his career while Tallinn was being ravaged by the Black Plague. When Tallinn capitulated to the Russian army in the Great Northern War, he was one of the first to provide the Russian army with medicines. In 1716, he became the town doctor and the doctor of the garrison and the naval hospital.

The fame of the Burchart family became so great that in 1725 even the Russian Tsar Peter the Great supposedly called for Johann Burchart V to attend to him on his deathbed, but he died before Burchart reached St. Petersburg.

In 1802, Johann Burchart VIII established a private museum of local life and curiosities, calling it "Mon faible". Several items from his collection are now displayed in the Estonian History Museum. In 1802, he organized the first art exhibition in Tallinn.

From 1880 to 1885 the first Estonian-speaking pharmacist with a degree from University of Tartu, Oskar Mildebrath, was hired by the Pharmacy.

The last two Burcharts were men of ill health, who could not supervise the pharmacy and leased it out to others again. The Burcharts rule over the pharmacy came to an end in the 1890s with the death of the last male heir of the named Johann X Burchart. The sisters of Johann X sold the property in 1911 to C. R. Lehbert, ending the family-run business which had lasted for ten generations.

=== 1944–1991 ===
During the second Soviet occupation of the Baltic States, the pharmacy was nationalized.

=== 1991 to present ===
After 1990, the entire pharmacy underwent extensive refurbishment, as the building had been neglected for almost 50 years. This refurbishment lasted over a decade until 2003.

Presently the main part of the pharmacy is located on the first floor and sells most modern medicines, including aspirin, and even supplies condoms.

There is an antiques shop on the first floor and in 1999 a garlic restaurant called "Balthasar" was opened on the second floor.

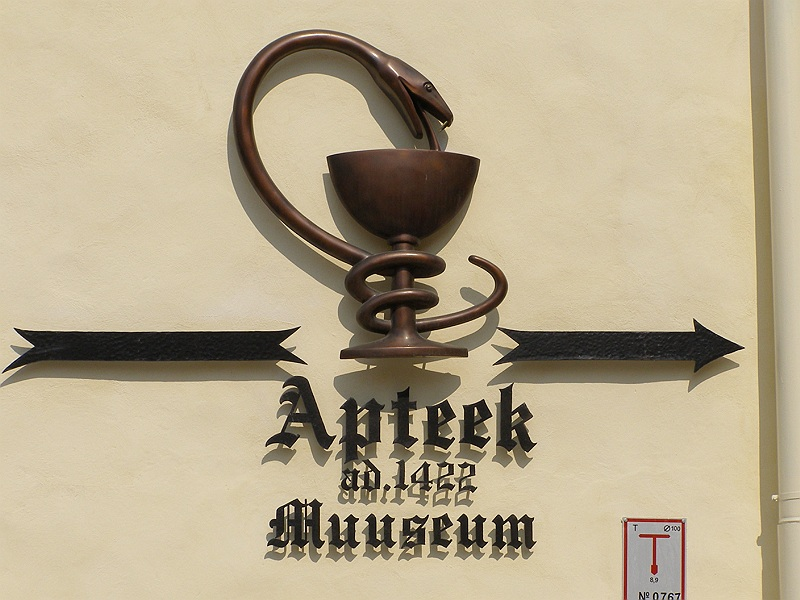
Sign of the Raeapteek

== Features ==
Near the modern pharmacy on the first floor there is a small museum displaying old medical instruments, historical chemist tools and other curiosities. Set in the wall, the museum also contains a large stone coat of arms of the Burchart family, dating from 1635. It shows a griffin with a crown and underneath a rose between lilies.

On the second floor, there is a pillar on which a stonemason has carved the date 1663 together with Burchart's coat of arms.

== Products sold throughout history ==
In medieval times patients could buy mummy juice (powder made of oversea mummies mixed with liquid), burnt hedgehogs powder, burnt bees, bat powder, snakeskin potion and unicorn horn powder for treatments.

Also, available were earthworms, swallow's nests and various herbs and spirits, distilled at the spot.

Food was also sold such as candies, cookies, preserves and marzipan and jellied peel. Spicy cookies called "morsells" were a specialty.

One could even find a glass of Klaret (a locally sugared and spiced Rhine-wine wine). Later, the pharmacy acquired the privilege to import around 400 liters of French cognac tax-free on an annual basis.

The pharmacy also sold paper, ink, sealing-wax, dyes, gunpowder, pellets, spices, candles and torches. When tobacco was brought to Europe and eventually to Estonia, the pharmacy was the first to sell it.

== See also ==
- Apothecary
- Baltic Germans
- History of pharmacy
- Both family, Burchart dynasty.
- List of oldest companies

== Sources ==
- Seuberlich, Erich: Liv- und Estlands älteste Apotheken. Beiträge zu deren Geschichte gesammelt und bearbeitet von Erich Seuberlich. Riga, Druck von F.W. Häcker 1912
- Website of the restaurant "Balthasar" on the second floor. Includes a short history of the pharmacy
- History of the Pharmacy
- R. Sõukand, A. Raal: Data on medicinal plants in Estonian folk medicine: collection, formation and overview of previous researches
- Miljan, Toivo, 2004: Historical Dictionary of Estonia. (limited preview)
- Website of the pharmacy
