= John Both =

John Both may refer to:

- Jan Dirksz Both (c. 1610–1652), Dutch painter, draughtsman, and etcher
- John Both de Bajna (died 1493), Hungarian nobleman
