= Both family =

Hungarian family

House of Both
- Country: Kingdom of Hungary: Kingdom of Croatia
- Founded: 13th century
- Cadet branches: Bothfalva branch Bajna branch Szikava and Bélavár branch: House of Bélaváry; House of Burchard-Bélaváry

The Both family is a Hungarian aristocratic family who gave many personalities. Its members were Magnats Magnificus and medieval barons of the Kingdom of Hungary since the 13th century. This family is issue from Osl de genere Csorna, who had seven sons. The Osl family were one of the clans of the seven Magyar tribes, who received the task of colonizing the actual Győr-Moson-Sopron County. The oldest archives of the Both family date from 1282.

== History ==
It gave different branches:

- Both de Bothfalva (bodafalvai Both).
  - Bot (Bod, Bud) de Kistarnóc, Felsősebes lord, son of Gotthard (or Lothard) of Csorna. He received in 1285 the castle and lands of Kistarnóc from the King Ladislaus IV of Hungary, and Panatarnóca by Charles I of Hungary in 1310, that area becomes Budfalva (now Ботфалва in Ukraine).
  - Péter Both Botfalvai († c. 1417), főispán (supremus comes) of Ugocsa.
  - György Both de Botfalvai († c. 1451) főispán de Ung.
  - Both Gyula von Bothfalva (18th–19th century), Chief Justice of Upper Hungary (oberster der Richter oberungarischen in German).
  - Menyhert I. Both von Bothfalva (†1882), royal prosecutor (Königlicher Ankläger in German).
  - Vitéz botfalvi Both Gyula, major in the Royal Hussars (huszárőrnagy in Hungarian) during World War II.
- Both de Bajna (bajnai Both, from the precedent) :
  - János Both de Bajna († 1493), ban of Croatia in 1493. He was the son of Stephen Both de Bajna, and had three brothers: Andrew, Ambrus, and Imre.
  - András Both de Bajna († 1511), his brother, Ban of Croatia repeatedly (1482; 12 October 1504 – 1507 and 1510 – 13 September 1511).
  - Magdolna Both de Bajna, daughter of Ambrus, lord of Ászár (1456–1495), she is the wife of János Korotnay (†1494), Palatine of Hungary.
  - Ferencz Both Bajna († 1526), ban. Husband of Agnes Batthyány, daughter of Boldizsár I. Batthyány, chamberlain of the king of Hungary (1462–1520).
  - János Both de Bajna, vice-ban of Croatia, captain of Belgrade. He was the son of János Both de Bajna and Apollonia Chapy. His wife was Margit Bánffy de Alsólendva, Miklós' daughter. They had a son, Gábor Both the Bajna, who lives in 1560, but in 1564 is mentioned as dead.
  - George Both de Bajna (1508- †1552), son of Ferencz, grandson of János Both de Bajna and Apollonia Chapy. George's wife was Borbala Hásshagy, daughter of Dénes Hásshagy captain of the castle of Kanizsa, and Katalin Kerecheny de Kányaföld.
  - Elisabeth Both de Bajna, daughter of George Both de Bajna and Borbála Hásshágy. Elisabeth first married Márk Horváth de Karnicsaczy in 1560, who died in 1561. After her husband's death, she became the wife of Miklós Istvánffy (1558–1615), historian, vice-Palatine of Hungary.
  - Margit Both de Bajna, daughter of George Both de Bajna and Borbála Hásshágy. She was the wife of Paul Paksy de Pakos, who was son of Job Paksy de Pakos, captain of the fortress of Tokaj, landowner and Justina Hagymássy de Beregszó.
  - Bálint Both de Bajna, főispán of Arad in 1550.
- Both de Sycava and Bélavar (szikavai és bélavári Both, from the precedent), next Burchard von Bélavary de Sicava.
  See the main article Burchard-Bélaváry family.

== Main alliances ==
Csapy (c. 1465), Csáky (16th century), Bánffy de Alsólindva (15th–16th century), Batthyány (1508), Horváth (c. 1555), Istvánffy (c. 1560), Hassaghi (16th), Hagymássy (15th), von Canferbeck (c. 1580), von Spreckelsen (c. 1630), Viczmándy de Izbugya (c. 1630), Dessewffy (1663), von Thieren (1649, 1698), von Wistinghausen (1678, 1747), von Cahl (1679), von Knorring (c. 1748), von zur Mühlen (1757), Rausch de Traubenberg (c. 1770), von Rosenberg (1774), von Kursell (c. 1785), Krakus-Mayerin (1786), von Smitten (c. 1800), Wiemuth (c. 1822), Bukowski von Stolzenburg (c. 1820), von Glehn (1823, 1831), Oláh de Landser (ca 1850), Wojakowski (1824), von Wimpffe (de) (19th–20th)), Delbeck) (1857), Henriot (1887), Noël (1887, 1896), Pallavicini (1901), du Authier (c. 1905).

== Gallery ==

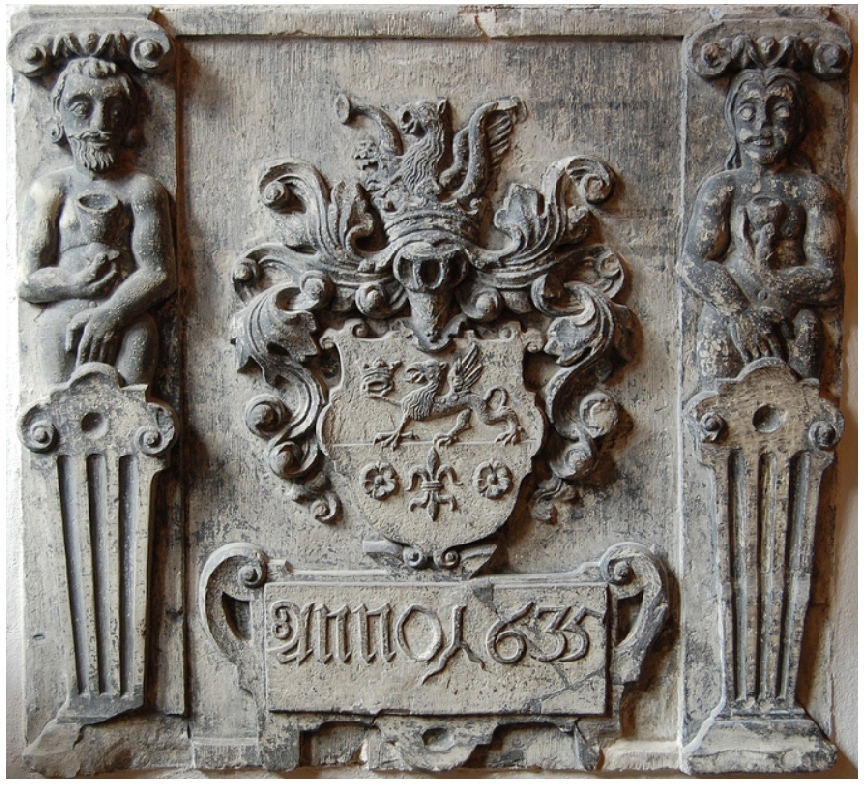

== See also ==
- Austria-Hungary
- Hungarian heraldry
- List of titled noble families in the Kingdom of Hungary
- Nobility and royalty of the Kingdom of Hungary

== Sources ==
- Béla Meliorisz. A Bothfalvi Both család címere, Turul, 1901
- Iván Nagy. Magyarország családai, Pest, 1857-1868
- Samu Borovszky. Magyarország vármegyéi és városai, Pest, 1896-1911
- Klement Judit. The Business Strategy of Fathers and Sons:A Hungarian Family in the 19th and 20th Centuries, ed. in AETAS – Journal of history and related disciplines (1-2/2005)
- Krisztina Tóth. Bajna. A Both nemzetség falut teremt, István Bárdos Ed.
- Magyar Heraldikai és Geneológiai Társaság, Budapest, 1894, 1899, 1901, 1902, 1926
- Marcel Burchard-Bélavary. Récits de famille, Histoire de la Famille Burchard-Bélaváry, Berger-Levrault & Cie, Nancy, 1906; La Hulpe, Bruxelles, 2001
- George Szekér. Nagykanizsa – Romlottvár, dipl. Architecte, 2007, Budapest
