= Rapain Klanac =

- Village
- Interactive map of Rapain Klanac
- Location within Croatia
- Coordinates: 44.96408°N 15.08757°E
- Country: Croatia
- County: Lika-Senj
- Municipality: Brinje

Area
  - Total: 2.6 sq mi (6.8 km^{2})

Population (2021)
  - Total: 6
  - Density: 2.3/sq mi (0.88/km^{2})
- Time zone: UTC+1 (CET)
  - Summer (DST): UTC+2 (CEST)

Rapain Klanac is a village in Brinje, Croatia. It is connected by the D50 road.
