= Dávid Bélaváry =

17th-century diplomat and high official of Hungary

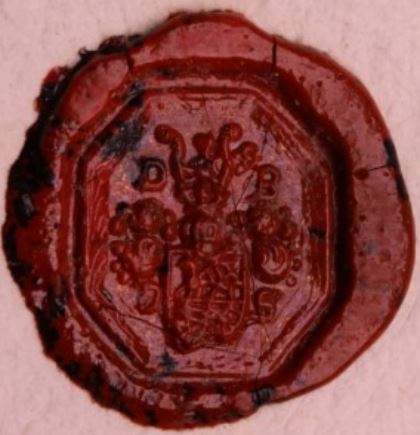

President of the Chamber of Upper Hungary
- In office 1621–1629
- Preceded by: Menyhért Rajner
- Succeeded by: Zsigmond Péchy

Prefect of Prince Gabriel Bethlen
- In office 1620–1629

Personal details
- Born: circa 1580; Kingdom of Hungary
- Died: Kingdom of Hungary
- Profession: economist, politician

Dávid Bélaváry de Szikava (born c. 1580) (szikavai és Bélaváry Dávid in Hungarian; David Belevari/Belavary in Latin; Давид Шикован-Біловарі [David Shykovan-Bilovari] in Ukrainian) was a diplomat and high official of the Kingdom of Hungary during the seventeenth century.

== Biography ==
Member of the Bélaváry family, he is the son on György Both Bélaváry de Szikava and Fruzsina Vizkelety. Dávid is quoted in 1600 as the prefect and judge of the court (udvarbíró) of several places, as the house of the Archdiocese of Esztergom in Körmöcbánya. In 1604, he attended István Bocskai during the anti-Habsburg uprising (1604–1606). He was also governor of Galgocz and Likava and governor of the domains of the primate of Hungary (cited in 1618 and 1620).

He appears in the entourage of Prince Gabriel Bethlen in 1619 and becomes January 23, 1620 the administrator of his property and income (universorum bonorum administrator). Thereby Dávid Bélaváry is the prefect of the prince, his economic policy maker and his economic expert in Upper Hungary.

An influential councillor, he became in 1621 the president and administrator of the Chamber of Upper Hungary (also called "Chamber of Szepes" or "Chamber of Kassa") - supreme institution for the finances and economy of Upper Hungary - until the death of Bethlen in 1629. Delegated commissioner of his Excellency, he is quoted as "supreme prefect of the Chamber, councilor and supreme prefect of the region of cis- and ultra Tybiscanus" (camerae supremus praefectus, consiliarius necnon omnium artium cis and ultra Tibiscanorum supremus praefectus in Latin). As example the region of Cis-Tybiscanus including the following counties: Abaujvariensis, Bereghiensis, Borsodiensis, Gömöriensis, Hevesiensis et Szolnok mediocris, Sarosiensis, Scepusiensis, Tornensis, Unghvariensis and Zempliniensis.

He was lord of Vörösvár, Kovászó, Bene, Konaszo, etc.
