= Vodoteč =

- Village
- Interactive map of Vodoteč
- Location within Croatia
- Coordinates: 45.04401°N 15.08517°E
- Country: Croatia
- County: Lika-Senj
- Municipality: Brinje

Area
  - Total: 30.5 sq mi (78.9 km^{2})

Population (2021)
  - Total: 32
  - Density: 1.1/sq mi (0.41/km^{2})
- Time zone: UTC+1 (CET)
  - Summer (DST): UTC+2 (CEST)

Vodoteč is a village in Brinje, Croatia. It is connected by the D23 road.
