= Konrád Burchard-Bélaváry =

Hungarian businessman and diplomat (1837 - 1916)

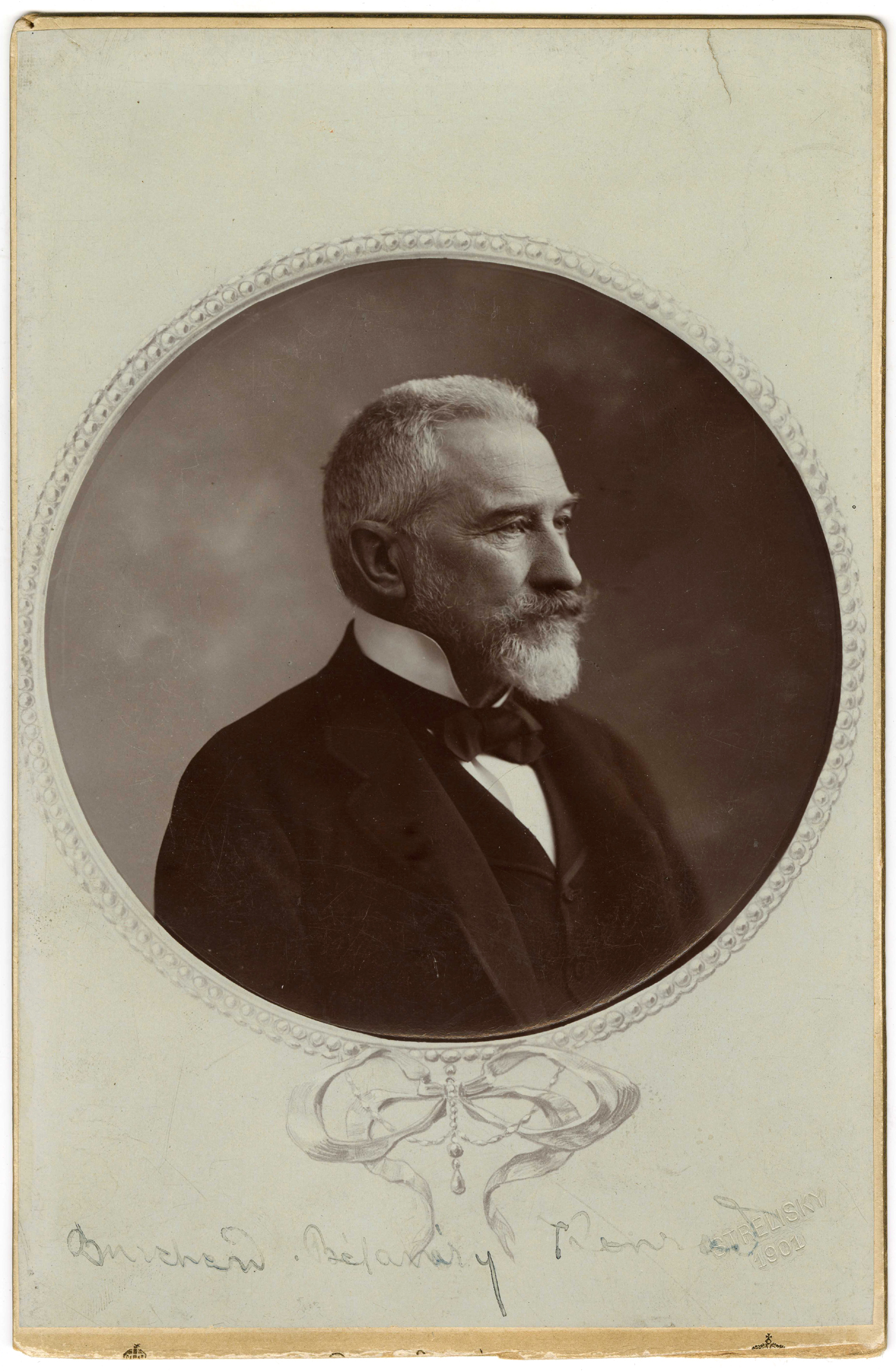
- Born: 1837; Eperjes, Austrian Empire
- Died: 1916; Budapest, Austria-Hungary

Konrád Burchard-Bélaváry (1837–1916), was a Hungarian Business magnate and diplomat.

Formed at the Berlin University of Commerce, he became CEO of the Gristmill of Pest (Pesti Hengermalom Társaság), vice-CEO and member of the board of directors of various companies :Adria (Shipping Company), Hotel Royal, National Union of Cooperatives of Credits, etc. Burchard-Bélaváry was the first major Hungarian industrialist to be appointed a life member of the House of Magnates, in 1885. He was also Consul general of Brazil in Budapest for fourteen years (1884–98).
He was knight of the Order of Franz Joseph (1882) and of the Imperial Order of Leopold (1916). He was also a recipient of orders from Brazil, Spain and Belgium. Member of the National Casino of Budapest from 1896.

Member of the Burchard-Bélaváry family, he married Auguszta Fuchs (1846–1903), daughter of Rudolf Fuchs (1809–1892), an industrial who was president of the Chamber of Commerce of Budapest (1857–59), great-niece of Johann Samuel Fuchs (1770–1817), Lutheran Bishop of Lemberg, and sister-in-law of Professor Vilmos Schulek. Konrád took over the education of his nephew Gusztav von Oláh, who was orphaned at the age of two. He is also himself a cousin of Józef Paczoski.
