= Stajnica =

- Village
- Interactive map of Stajnica
- Location within Croatia
- Coordinates: 45.03521°N 15.25440°E
- Country: Croatia
- County: Lika-Senj
- Municipality: Brinje

Area
  - Total: 14.8 sq mi (38.4 km^{2})

Population (2021)
  - Total: 166
  - Density: 11.2/sq mi (4.32/km^{2})
- Time zone: UTC+1 (CET)
  - Summer (DST): UTC+2 (CEST)

Stajnica is a village in Brinje, Croatia. It is connected by the D23 road.
