= Križpolje =

- Village
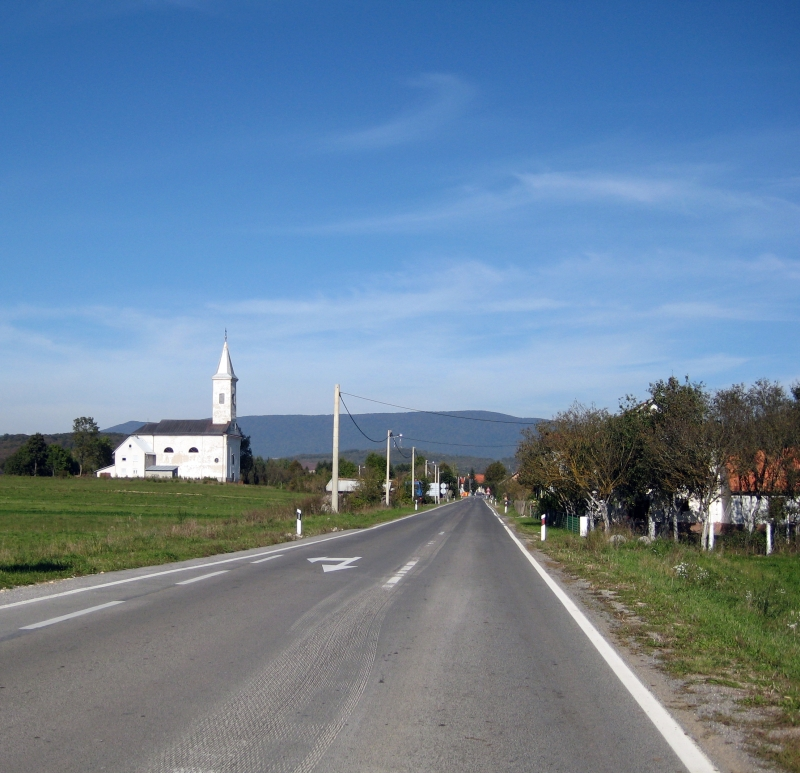
- Church of the Holy Cross, built in 1820

- Location within Croatia
- Coordinates: 45°01′34″N 15°09′49″E
- Country: Croatia
- Region: Lika
- County: Lika-Senj
- Municipality: Brinje

Area
  - Total: 30.6 km^{2} (11.8 sq mi)
- Elevation: 548 m (1,798 ft)

Population (2021)
  - Total: 392
  - Density: 12.8/km^{2} (33.2/sq mi)
- Time zone: UTC+1 (CET)
  - Summer (DST): UTC+2 (CEST)
- Postal code: 53261
- Area code: 053
- Vehicle registration: GS

Križpolje is a village in the Lika-Senj County, Croatia. The settlement is administered as a part of Brinje municipality. According to national census of 2001, population of the settlement is 655.

== Bibliography ==
=== Biology ===
- Šašić, Martina; Nahirnić, Ana; Tarmann, Gerhard M. (2016-12-31). "Zygaenidae (Lepidoptera) in the Lepidoptera collections of the Croatian Natural History Museum". Natura Croatica: Periodicum Musei Historiae Naturalis Croatici. 25 (2): 233–248. doi:10.20302/NC.2016.25.19. eISSN 1848-7386.
