= István Burchard-Bélaváry =

Hungarian painter (1864–1933)

Istvan Burchard Bélaváry
- Born: February 4, 1864
- Died: October 21, 1933 (aged 69)
- Occupation: Painter

Signature
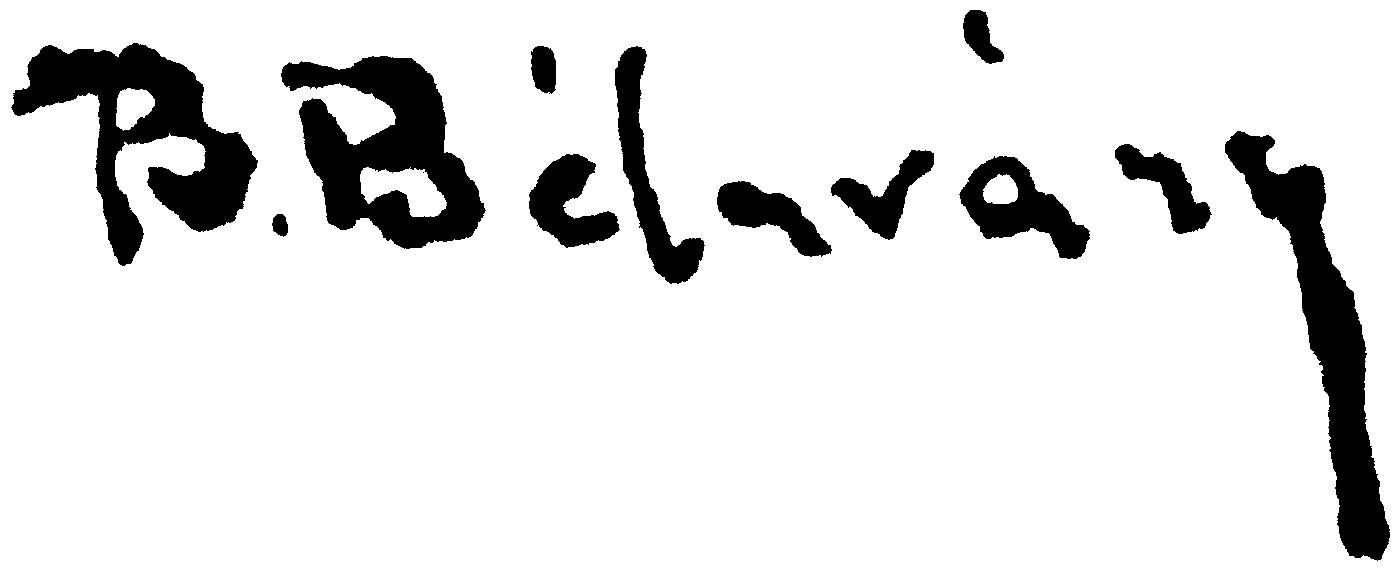

István Burchard-Bélaváry (February 4, 1864 – October 21, 1933) was a Hungarian painter.

== Biography ==
He was born in Mád, Zemplén County, Austrian Empire. He was the son of Gustave Burchard-Bélavary of Bélavar and Szikava (1829 Eperjes – 1903 Budapest), officer, professor of economics and commercial law, writer and painter, and Louise von Bukowski Stolzenburg (died 1913).

After schooling at Theresianum in Vienna, he turned to the arts. He lived eight years from 1887 in the United States. He contributed humorous illustrations to a California newspaper, "The Weekly Jonah" and then studied at the San Francisco Art Institute (1889–1890) and worked independently. He painted still lifes, genre scenes, landscapes and portraits. He returned to Europe in 1894. His masters were Anton Ažbe in Munich (1895–1896) and Filippo Colarossi at the Académie Colarossi in Paris (1897–1898). He invented in 1899 a special technique: "Glycerin distemper". He sold its patent in 1907 to Reeves and Sons which reports the process in UK under the name "Bélaváry pasteloid colors". Then he made a long stay in Italy and married in Florence in 1899.

He moved with his family to Pozsony in 1904. He led his own school of painting and was elected director of the Association of Fine Arts of Pozsony then director of the Salon of Pozsony in 1911. It organized various exhibitions, including one in London in 1907. He moved to Budapest in 1918. He was active in Budapest and Debrecen.

He married Enrica Coppini (1872–1960), who was a painter. He died in Pestszentlőrinc, Budapest.

== Gallery ==
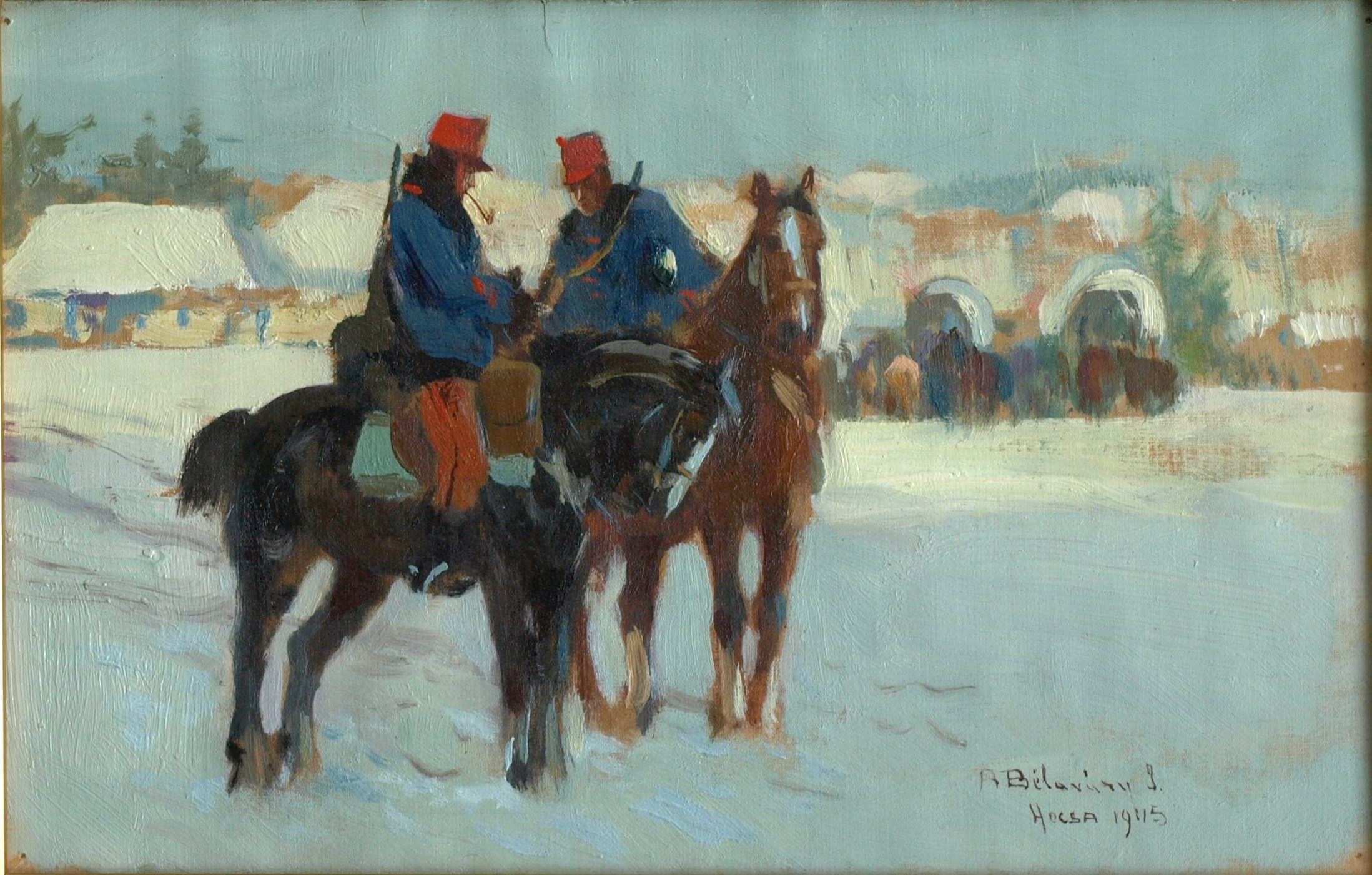
Hussards (Huszárok), 1911

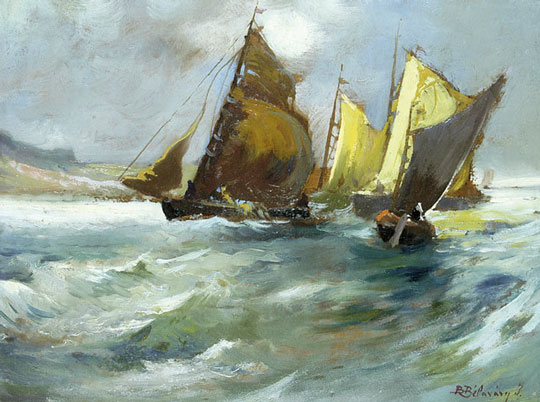
Sailboats (Tengeri vitorlások)

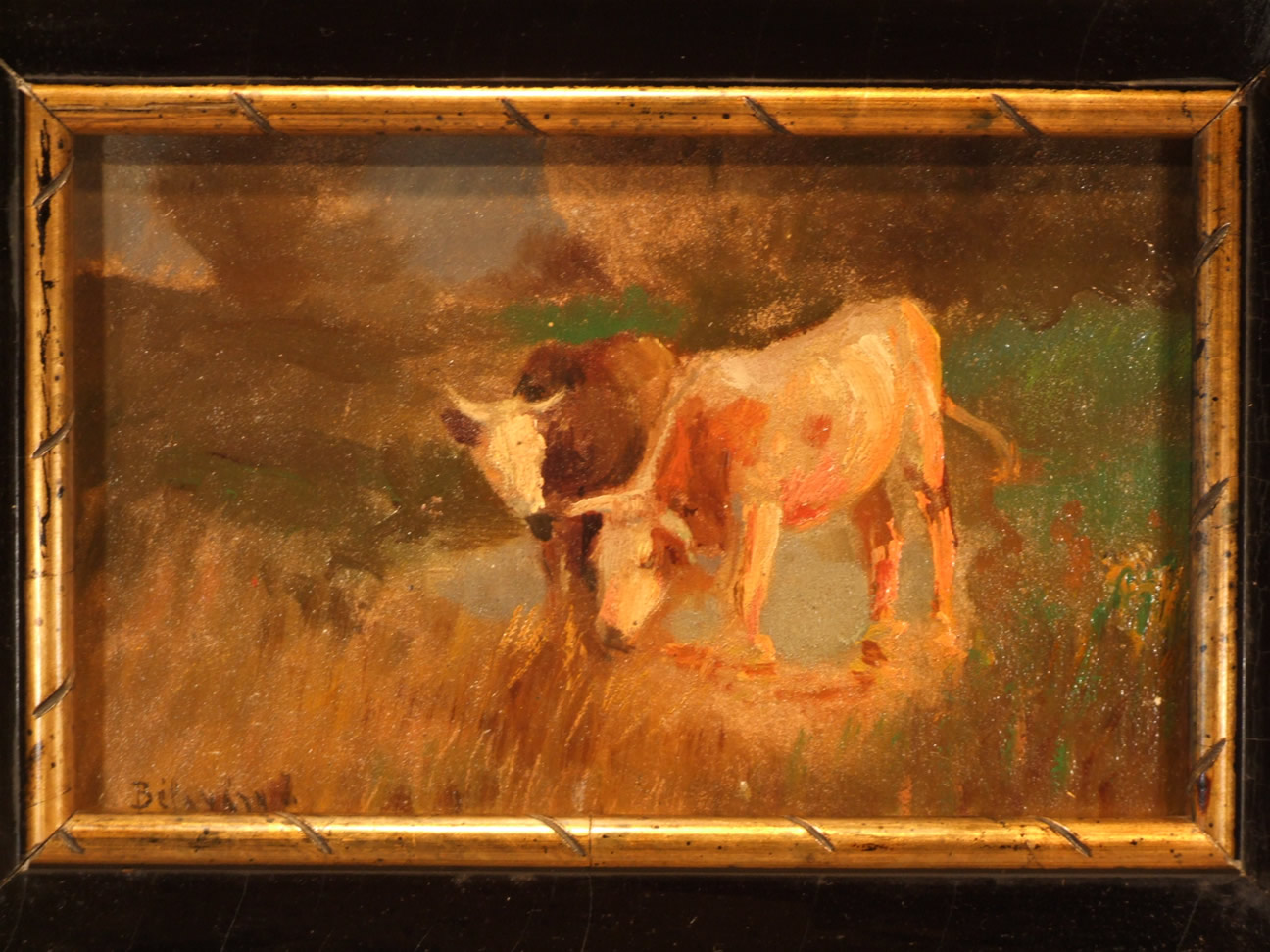

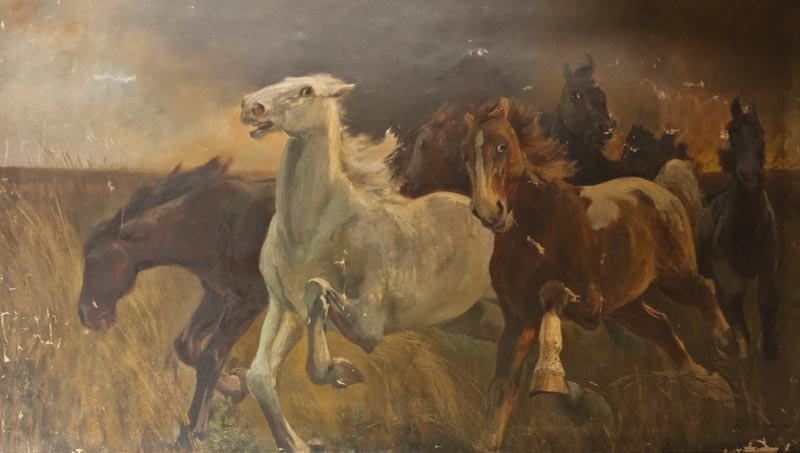
Galloping horses (Vágtató ménes)

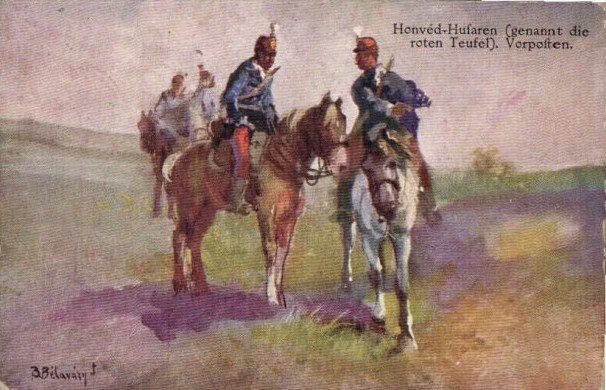
Hussards, said the "Red Devils". Vanguard. Postcard from aquarelle.

== Bibliography ==
- Éber László, Művészeti Lexikon - Győző Andor Kiadása, Budapest, 1933
- Akadémiai Kiadó, Művészeti Lexikon, Budapest, 1966
- Dr. Szabó - Kállai, Magyar festők és grafikusok életrajzi lexikona, Nyíregyháza, 1997
