= Glibodol =

- Village
- Interactive map of Glibodol
- Location within Croatia
- Coordinates: 44.99406°N 15.33015°E
- Country: Croatia
- County: Lika-Senj
- Municipality: Brinje

Area
  - Total: 2.05 sq mi (5.30 km^{2})

Population (2021)
  - Total: 7
  - Density: 3.4/sq mi (1.3/km^{2})
- Time zone: UTC+1 (CET)
  - Summer (DST): UTC+2 (CEST)

Glibodol is a village in Brinje, Croatia. It is connected by the D42 and D23 roads.
