= Lipice, Croatia =

Lipice Lipovo
- Village
- Interactive map of Lipice
- Location within Croatia
- Coordinates: 45.033°N 15.16°E
- Country: Croatia
- County: Lika-Senj
- Municipality: Brinje

Area
  - Total: 15.2 km^{2} (5.9 sq mi)

Population (2021)
  - Total: 94
  - Density: 6.2/km^{2} (16/sq mi)
- Time zone: UTC+1 (CET)
  - Summer (DST): UTC+2 (CEST)

Lipice is a village in the Lika-Senj County of Croatia, approximately 35 miles from the county's administrative center of Gospić. According to the 2021 census, Lipice had 98 inhabitants, all Croats.

== History ==
Lipice was first mentioned in writing in 1638.

== Population ==
The population of Lipice peaked in the early 20th century.

Year of counting	Population
1857	625
1869	815
1880	846
1890	870
1900	982
1910	1.051
1921	972
1948	1.025
1953	985
1961	898
1971	835
1981	555
1991	417
2001	254
