= Osli =

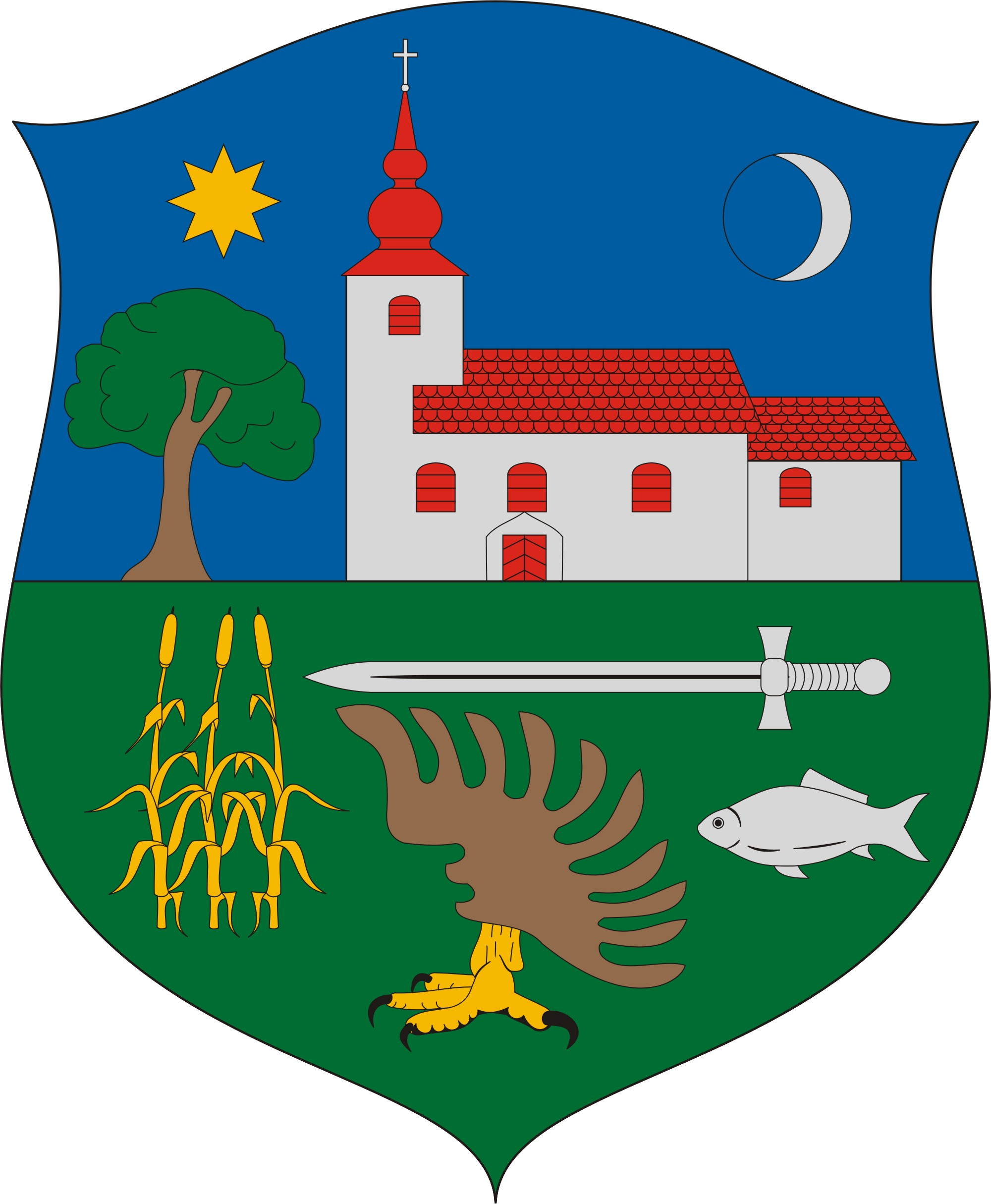
- Coat of arms

- Location of Győr-Moson-Sopron county in Hungary

- Location of Osli
- Coordinates: 47.63804°N 17.07796°E
- Country: Hungary
- County: Győr-Moson-Sopron

Area
  - Total: 18.81 km^{2} (7.26 sq mi)

Population (2023)
  - Total: 878
  - Density: 45.8/km^{2} (119/sq mi)
- Time zone: UTC+1 (CET)
  - Summer (DST): UTC+2 (CEST)
- Postal code: 9354
- Area code: 96

Osli is a village in Győr-Moson-Sopron county, Hungary.

== Gallery ==
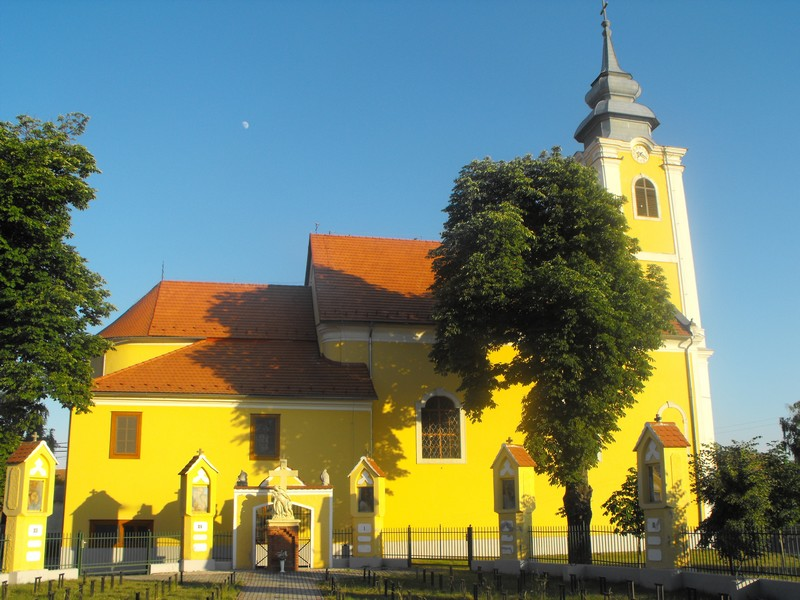
The catholic church

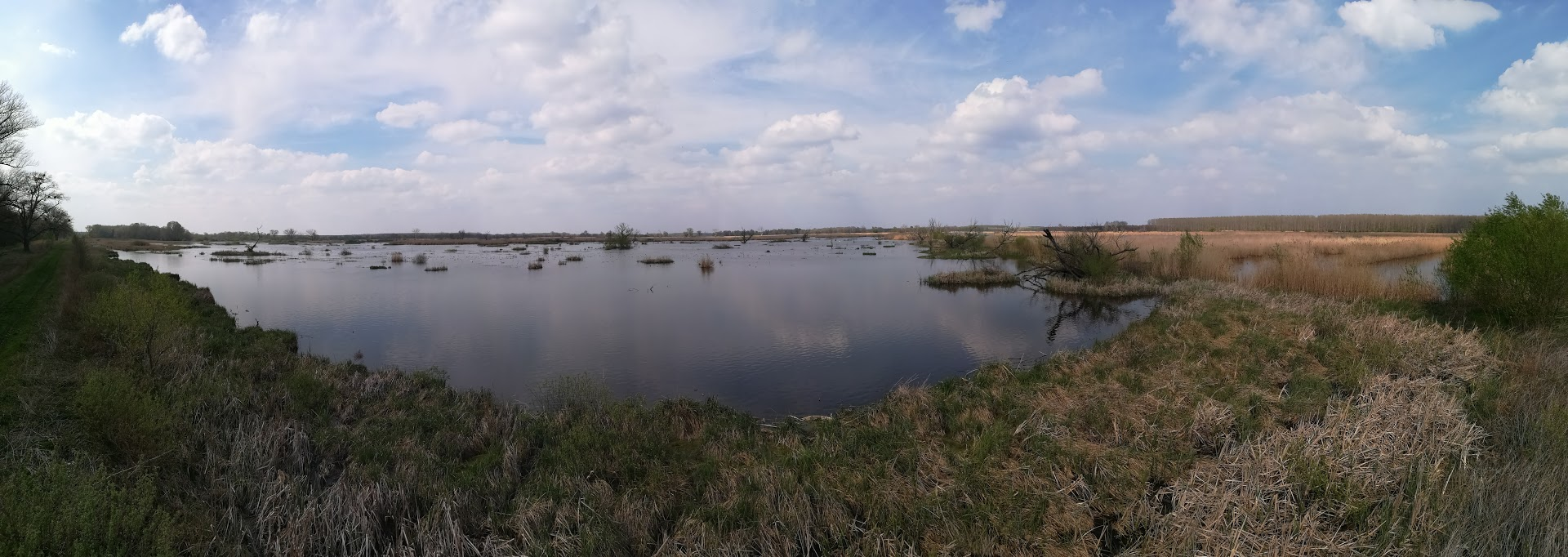
The "Hany", the part of the Fertő-Hanság National Park

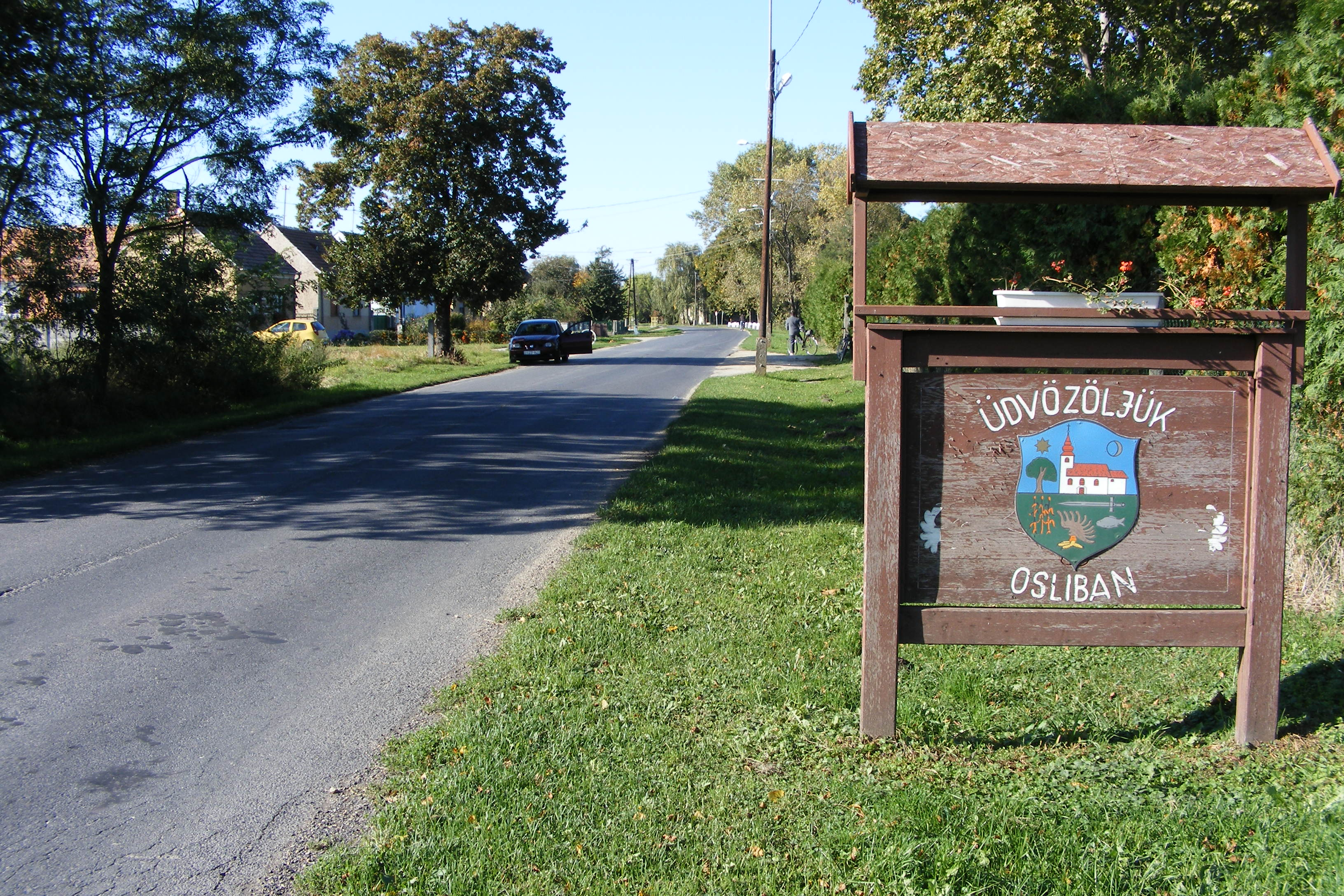
A part of the village

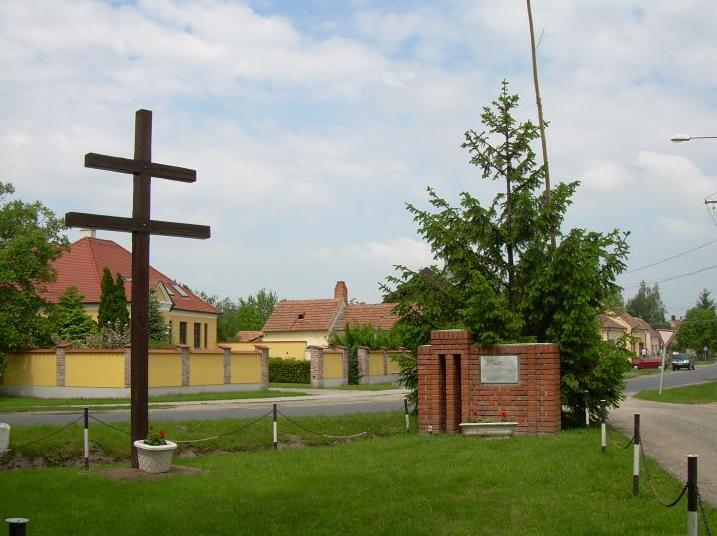
The Memorial Park

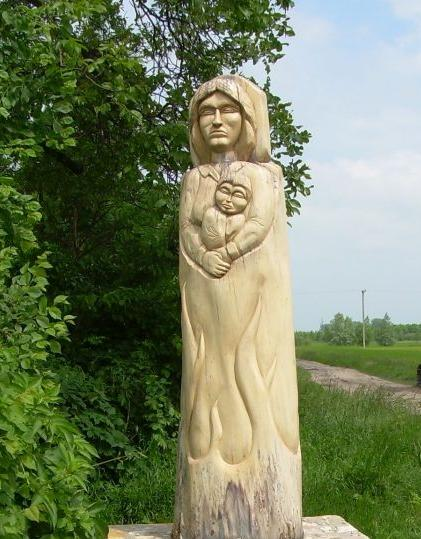
Memorial of the Revolution of 1956

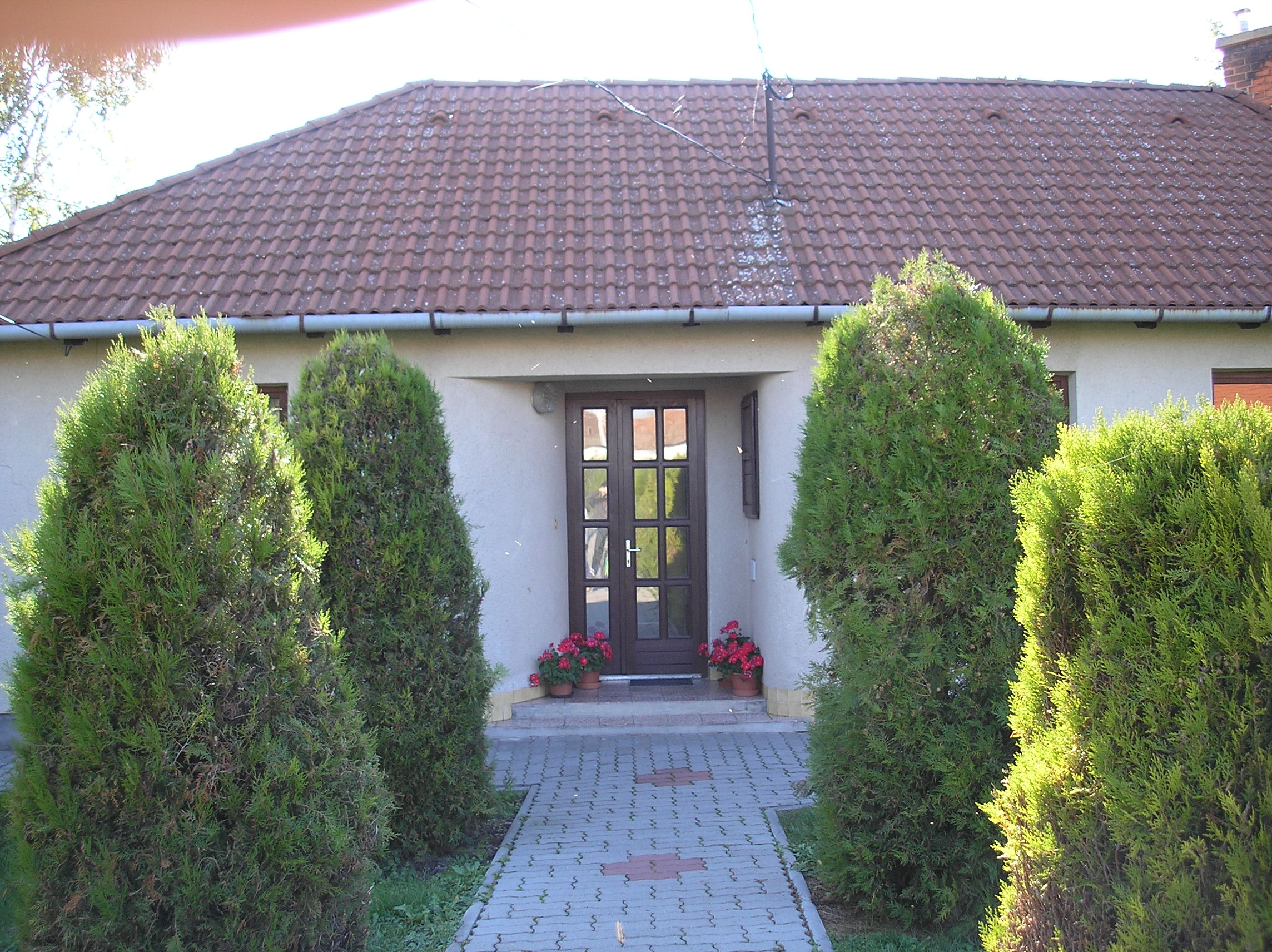
The building of the local government

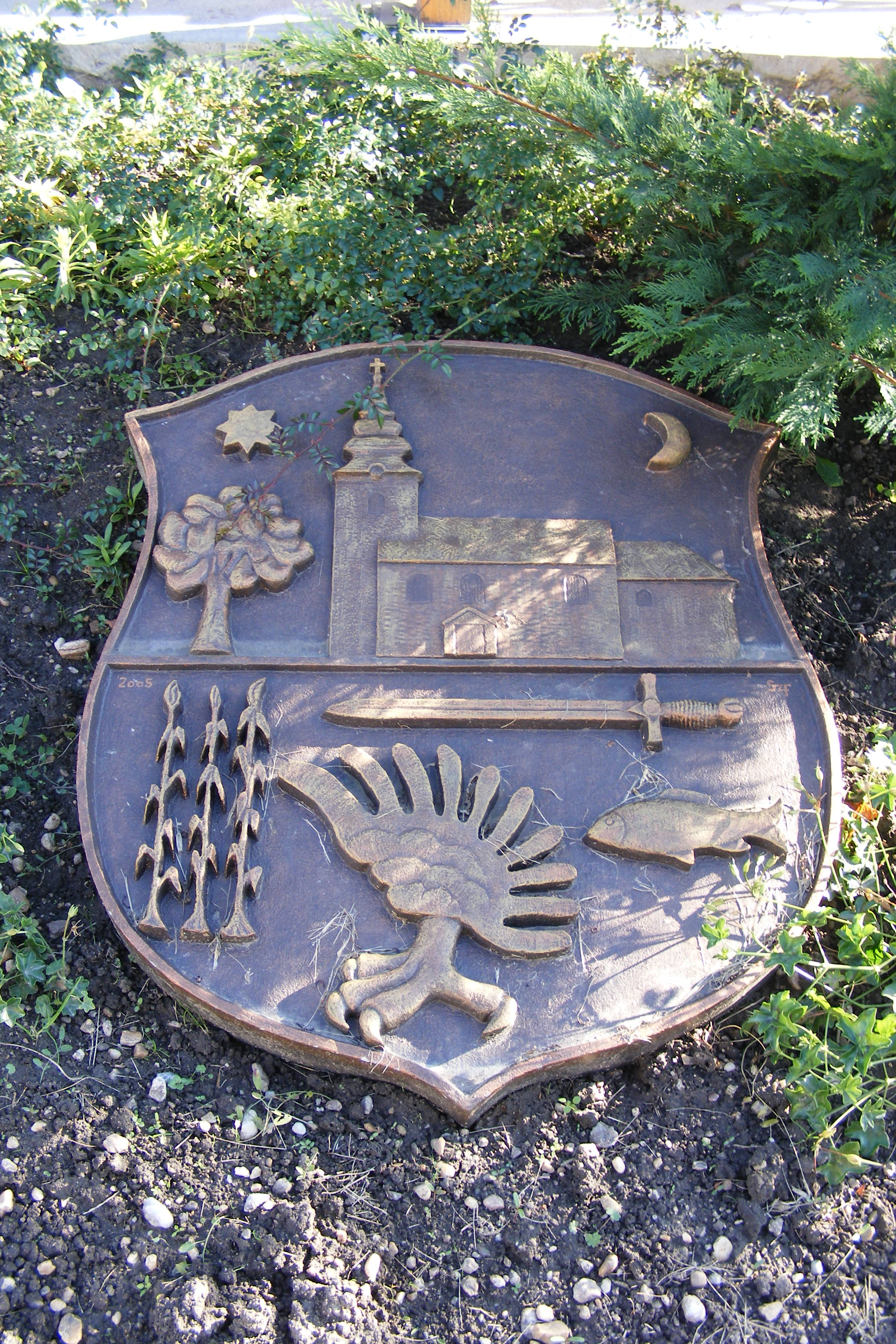
The crest

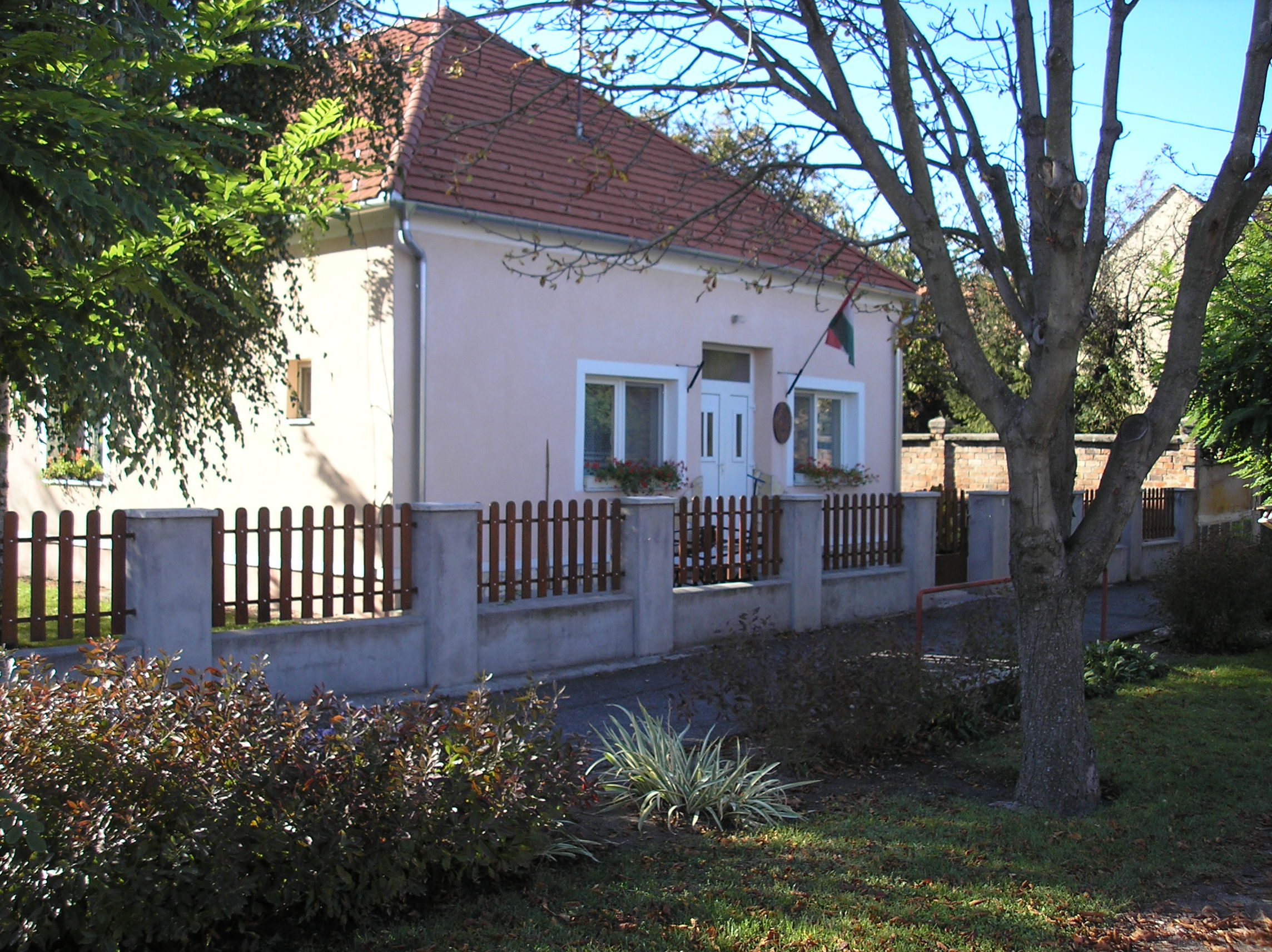
The kindergarten

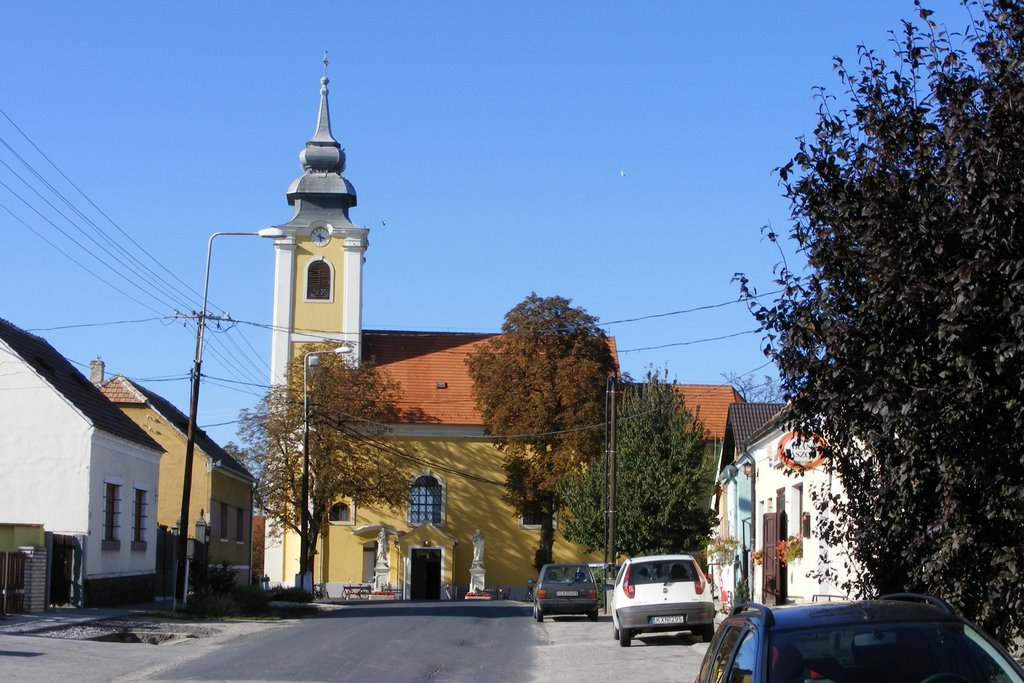
The main street with the church

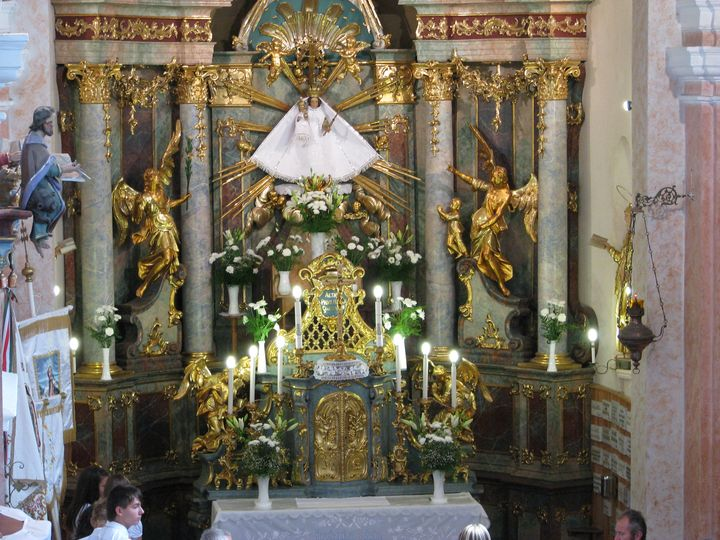
The altar in the church

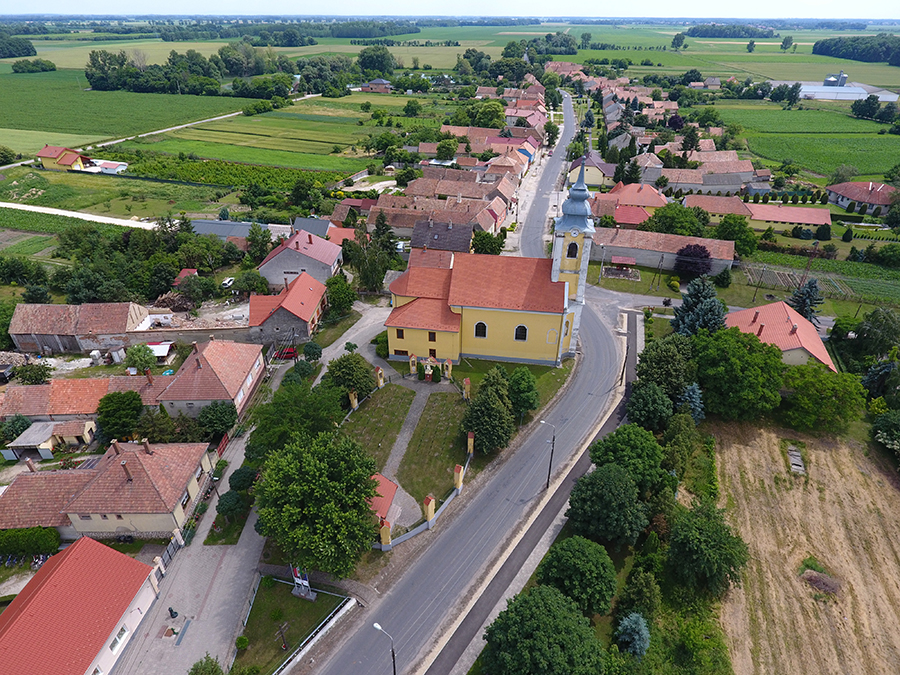
The church in the middle of the village

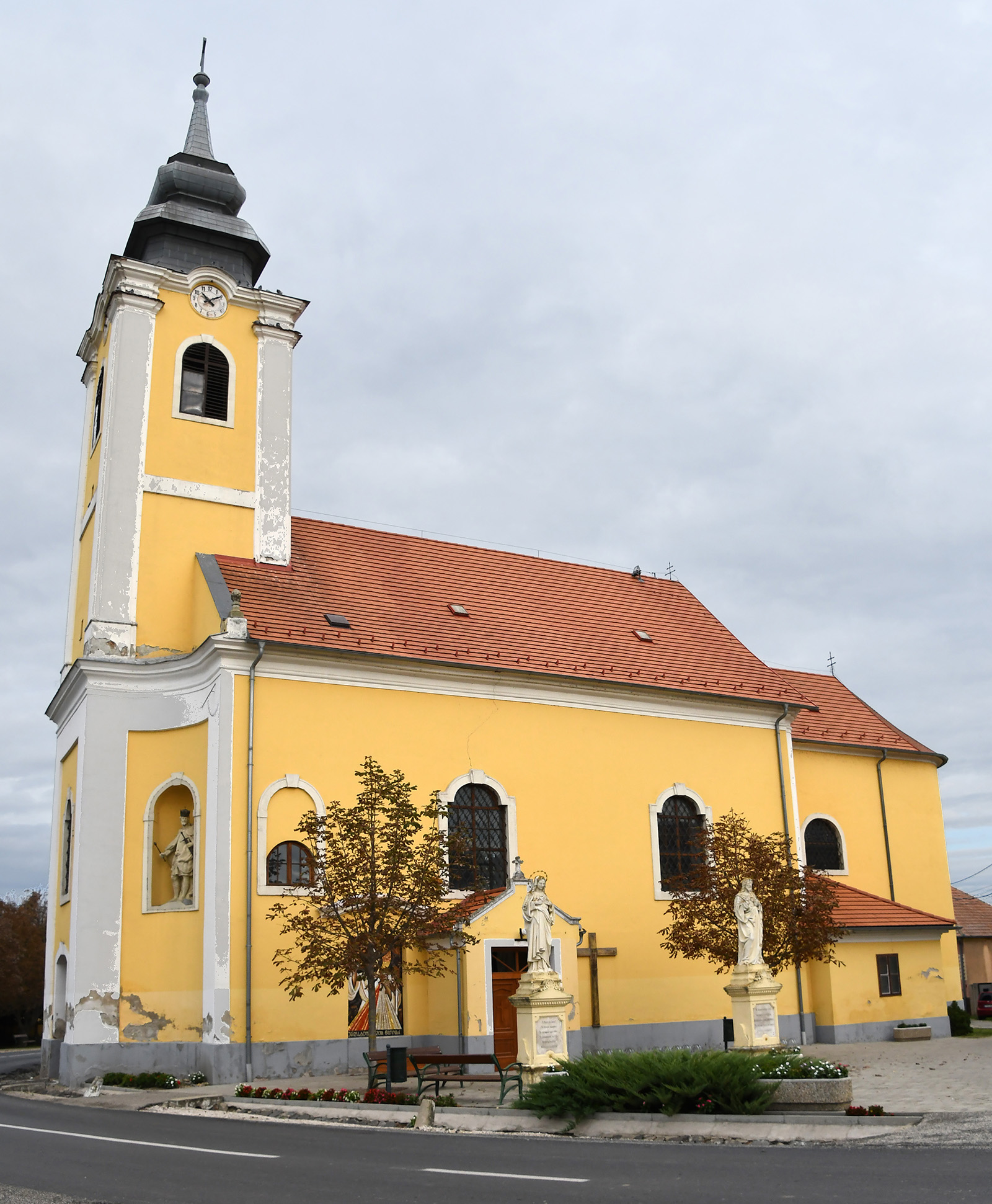
The Roman Catholic church
