= Sokolac (fortress near Brinje) =

- Brinje, in Lika-Senj County; Croatia
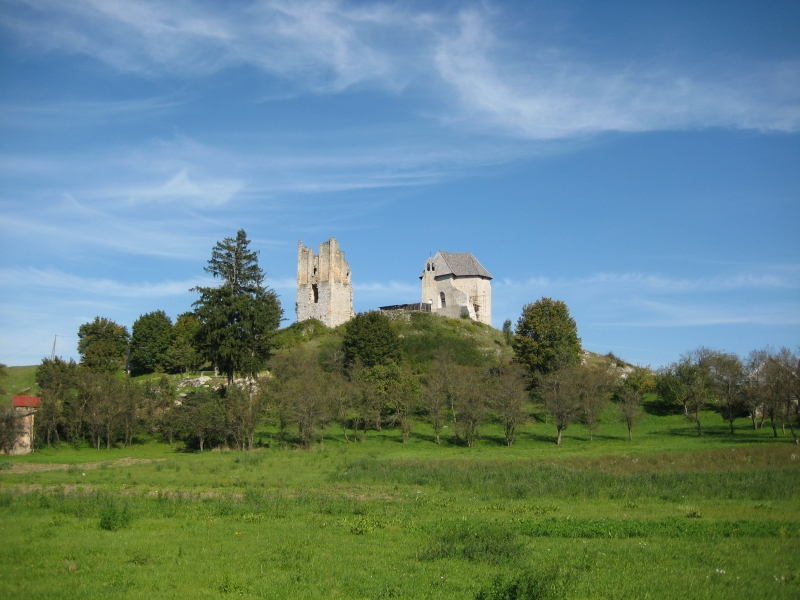
- Sokolac Castle

Site information
- Type: Castle
- Controlled by: Frankopan and Gorjanski families

Location
- Coordinates: 44.998°N 15.131°E

Site history
- Materials: Limestone

Sokolac (Croatian: Gradina Sokolac) is a medieval fortification in Brinje, Croatia. It is named after the Croatian word for falcon (sokol), which appears on the town's coat of arms.

== History ==
It dates back to medieval times built under King Ladislaus IV of Hungary, while the town was held by the noble Frankopan and Gorjanski families. The castle was part of an important medieval fortified city held by Frankopan family.

Sokolac Castle was an extremely grand building, dominated by the powerful perpendiculars of the entry tower, and the Chapel of the Holy Trinity. The entry into the burg was through a square, three-storey tower, the façades of which were relieved with lesenes linked at the top with blind arcades, making it a unique specimen in the whole of Central Europe.

== Gallery ==
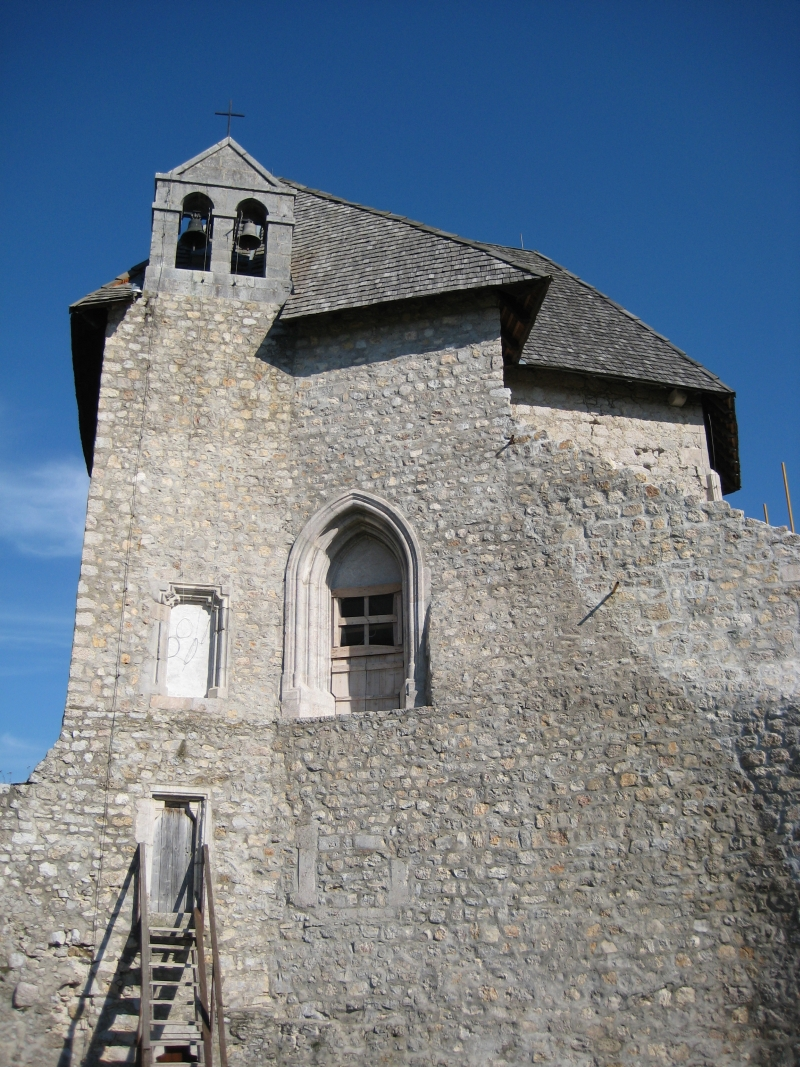

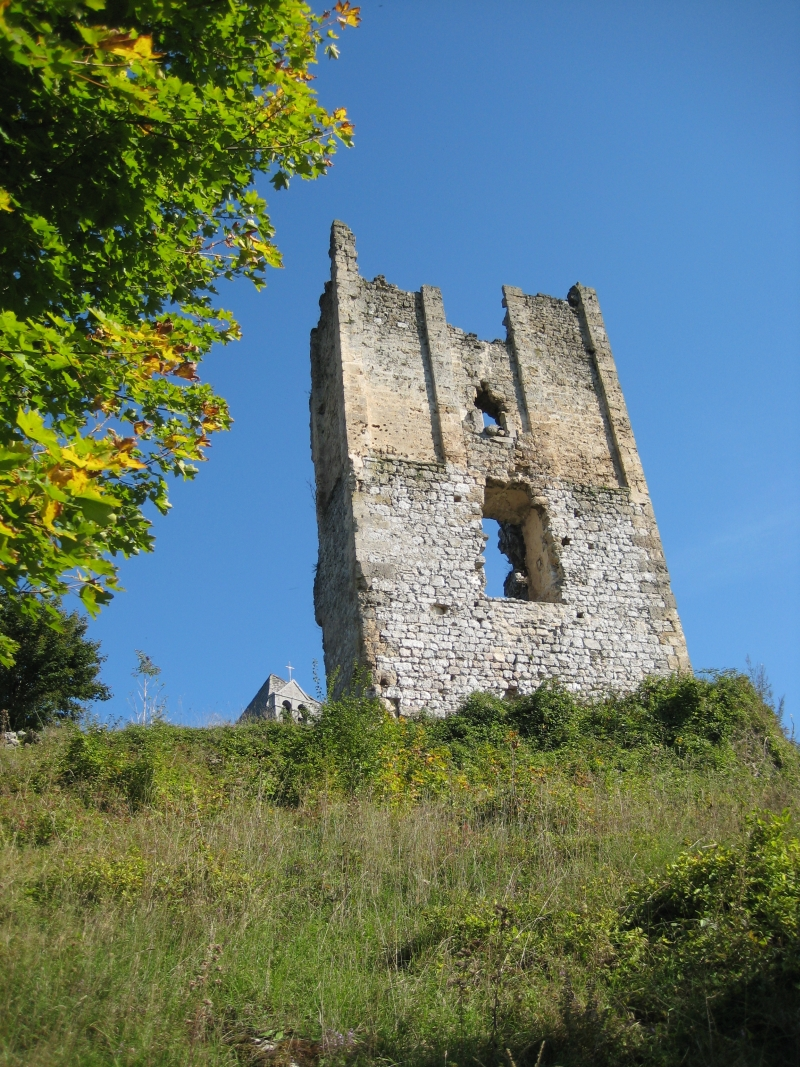

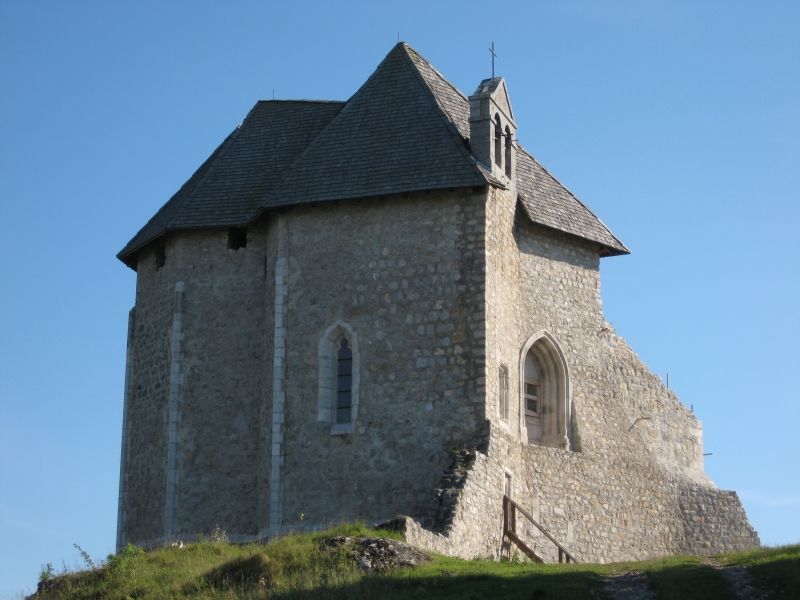

== See also ==
- Brinje
- List of castles in Croatia
- Frankopan
- Gorjanski
- Fortification

== Bibliography ==
- Pilar, Martin (1885). Cappelle auf der Burg "Sokolac" in Brinj, Kroatien. Signatures HR-ZaNSK GZAH 2712 pil 13, HR-ZaNSK GZAH 2707 pil 8, HR-ZaNSK GZAH 2713 pil 14, HR-ZaNSK GZAH 2703 pil 4. A series of architectural blueprints of the chapel.
