= Emerik Derenčin =

Hungarian-Croatian nobleman

Emerik Derenčin Imre Derencsényi

Ban of Croatia
- In office April 1493 – 9 September 1493
- Preceded by: Ladislav of Egervár
- Succeeded by: Ladislaus Kanizsai

Personal details
- Spouse: Ursula Zapolya
- Parent: János Derencsényi

Military service
- Battles/wars: Battle of Krbava Field (1493)

Emerik Derenčin (Hungarian: Imre Derencsényi, Croatian: Mirko Derenčin) was a Hungarian-Croatian nobleman remembered as the commander of the Croatian troops in the 1493 Battle of Krbava Field.

He was a member of the Derencsényi family from the kindred of Balog. Prior to becoming the ban, Derenčin was the military captain of Senj, and the ban of Jajce.

Derencsényi and John Both were named the Ban of Croatia and Dalmatia and Ban of Slavonia in 1493. In the Battle of Krbava Field, the Croats under Derenčin suffered a devastating loss, and Derenčin himself was taken captive and killed.

== Family ==
Derencsényi married Orsolya Zápolya, sister of Stephen Zápolya, the Palatine of Hungary. They had two sons and, probably, a daughter.

Political offices
Preceded by Ladislaus Egervári	Ban of Croatia alongside John Both de Bajna; 1493	Succeeded by Ladislaus Kanizsai
