= Žikava =

Žikava Zsikva
- Municipality
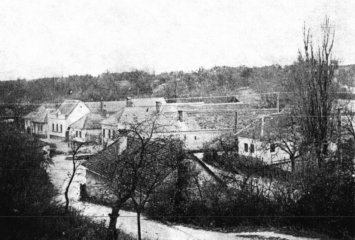
- Žikava in 1950

- Flag

- Location of Žikava in the Nitra Region Location of Žikava in Slovakia
- Coordinates: 48.44°N 18.38°E
- Country: Slovakia
- Region: Nitra Region
- District: Zlaté Moravce District
- First mentioned: 1075

Area
  - Total: 11.29 km^{2} (4.36 sq mi)
- Elevation: 274 m (899 ft)

Population (2025)
  - Total: 534
- Time zone: UTC+1 (CET)
  - Summer (DST): UTC+2 (CEST)
- Postal code: 951 92
- Area code: +421 37
- Vehicle registration plate (until 2022): ZM
- Website: www.obec-zikava.sk

Žikava (Hungarian: Zsikva) is a village and municipality in Zlaté Moravce District of the Nitra Region, in western-central Slovakia. In 2011 it had a population of 514 inhabitants.

== History ==
In historical records the village was first mentioned in 1075 : Sikula or Sichoua, Sichoa (in 1209), Sitva (1293), Zikawa (1773), Žikawa (1808). The Hungarian name is Zsikva (Phonetics : Sykava).

The village belongs to John Both de Bajna in 1492. A branch of this family will take the name of this village : the Both, next Burchad, Bélavary de Sykava.

== Geography ==
The municipality lies at an altitude of 274 metres (899 ft) and covers an area of 11.29 km^{2} (4.36 sq mi) (2025).

== Population ==
Population statistic (10 years)
Year	1995	2005	2015	2025
Count	595	538	516	534
Difference		−9.57%	−4.08%	+3.48%

Population statistic
Year	2024	2025
Count	534	534
Difference		+0%

It has a population of 534 people (31 December 2025).

=== Ethnicity ===
Census 2021 (1+ %)
Ethnicity	Number	Fraction
Slovak	504	95.45%
Not found out	19	3.59%
Total	528	

In year 2021 was 528 people by ethnicity 504 as Slovak, 19 as Not found out, 4 as Czech, 3 as Austrian, 2 as Romani, 2 as Canadian, 2 as Other, 1 as Russian, 1 as Polish and 1 as Hungarian.

Note on population: The difference values of population numbers in the table "Population statistic" and in the sections "Ethnicity" & "Religion" is caused by the use of various statistical methods.

=== Religion ===
Census 2021 (1+ %)
Religion	Number	Fraction
Roman Catholic Church	436	82.58%
None	53	10.04%
Not found out	23	4.36%
Apostolic Church	7	1.33%
Total	528	

In year 2021 was 528 people by religion 436 from Roman Catholic Church, 53 from None, 23 from Not found out, 7 from Apostolic Church, 4 from Greek Catholic Church, 2 from Other, 1 from Calvinist Church, 1 from Other and not ascertained christian church and 1 from Ad hoc movements.
