= Vyšná Šebastová =

Village and municipality in Slovakia

- Municipality
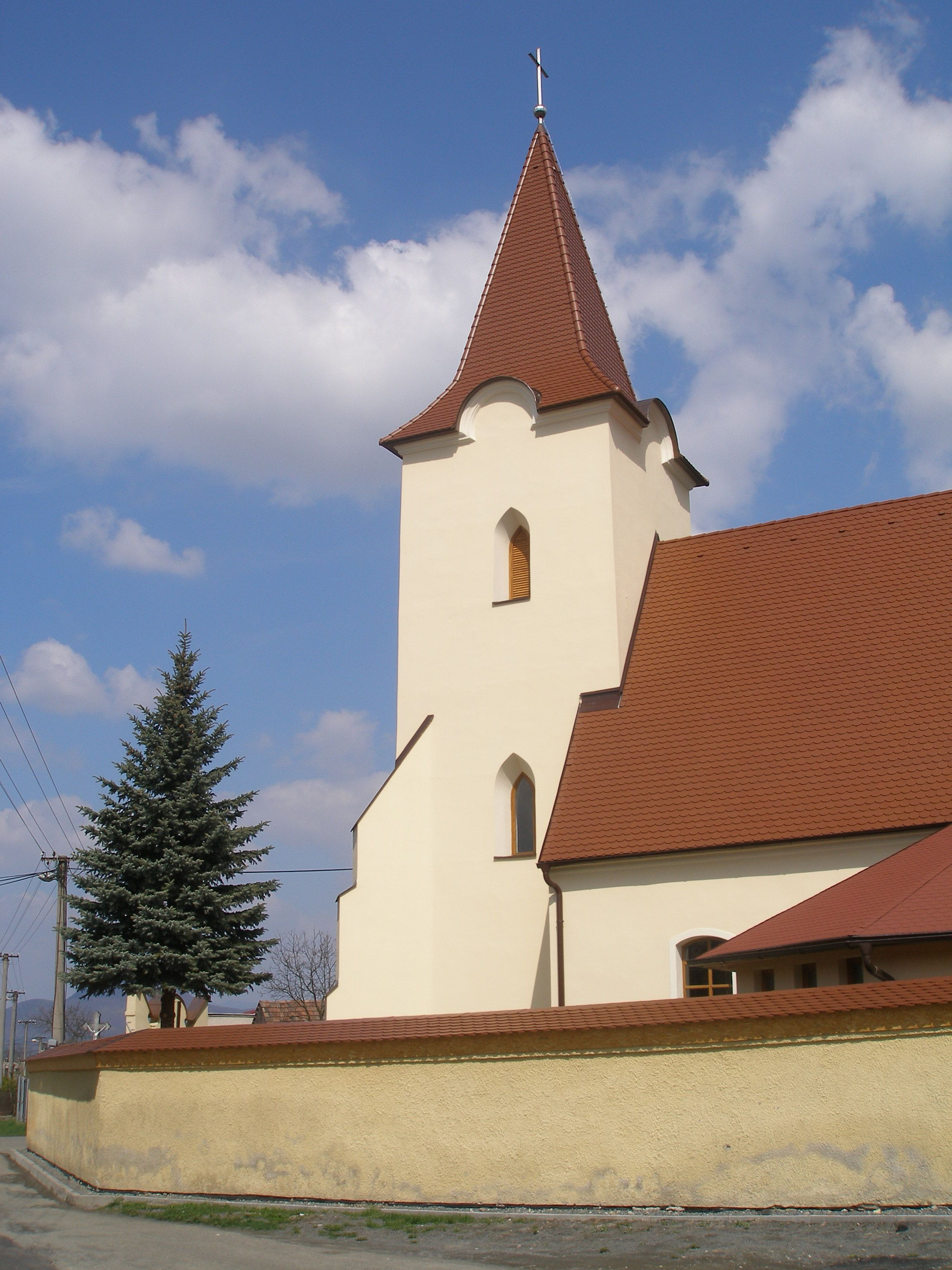

- Flag

- Location of Vyšná Šebastová in the Prešov Region Location of Vyšná Šebastová in Slovakia
- Coordinates: 49.02°N 21.33°E
- Country: Slovakia
- Region: Prešov Region
- District: Prešov District
- First mentioned: 1272

Area
  - Total: 9.82 km^{2} (3.79 sq mi)
- Elevation: 372 m (1,220 ft)

Population (2025)
  - Total: 1,347
- Time zone: UTC+1 (CET)
  - Summer (DST): UTC+2 (CEST)
- Postal code: 800 6
- Area code: +421 51
- Vehicle registration plate (until 2022): PO
- Website: www.vysnasebastova.sk

Vyšná Šebastová (}) is a village and municipality in Prešov District in the Prešov Region of eastern Slovakia.

== History ==
In historical records the village was first mentioned in 1272.

== Geography ==
The municipality lies at an altitude of 372 metres (1,220 ft) and covers an area of 9.82 km^{2} (3.79 sq mi) (2025).

== Population ==
Population statistic (10 years)
Year	1995	2005	2015	2025
Count	961	1031	1199	1347
Difference		+7.28%	+16.29%	+12.34%

Population statistic
Year	2024	2025
Count	1349	1347
Difference		−0.14%

It has a population of 1347 people (31 December 2025).

=== Ethnicity ===
Census 2021 (1+ %)
Ethnicity	Number	Fraction
Slovak	1307	97.9%
Rusyn	20	1.49%
Not found out	18	1.34%
Total	1335	

In year 2021 was 1335 people by ethnicity 1307 as Slovak, 20 as Rusyn, 18 as Not found out, 11 as Other, 5 as Ukrainian, 4 as Hungarian, 2 as Irish, 2 as Romani, 2 as English and 1 as Moravian.

Note on population: The difference values of population numbers in the table "Population statistic" and in the sections "Ethnicity" & "Religion" is caused by the use of various statistical methods.

=== Religion ===
Census 2021 (1+ %)
Religion	Number	Fraction
Roman Catholic Church	1023	76.63%
None	108	8.09%
Greek Catholic Church	76	5.69%
Evangelical Church	74	5.54%
Eastern Orthodox Church	19	1.42%
Not found out	15	1.12%
Total	1335	

In year 2021 was 1335 people by religion 1023 from Roman Catholic Church, 108 from None, 76 from Greek Catholic Church, 74 from Evangelical Church, 19 from Eastern Orthodox Church, 15 from Not found out, 5 from Other, 5 from Ad hoc movements, 3 from Jehovah's Witnesses, 2 from Calvinist Church, 1 from Paganism and natural spirituality, 1 from Hinduism, 1 from United Methodist Church, 1 from Buddhism and 1 from Apostolic Church.
