= Brinje =

Municipality in Lika-Senj, Croatia

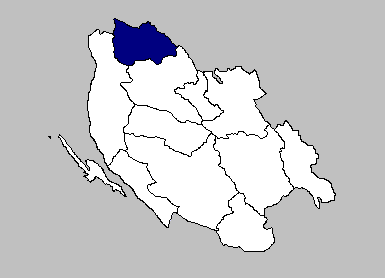
- Brinje municipality within Lika-Senj County
- Interactive map of Brinje
- Location of Brinje in Croatia
- Coordinates: 45°N 15.1308°E
- Country: Croatia
- County: Lika-Senj County

Government
  - Mayor: Zlatko Fumić (HDZ)

Area
  - Total: 48.8 km^{2} (18.8 sq mi)

Population (2022)
  - Total: 2,471
  - Density: 50.6/km^{2} (131/sq mi)
- Time zone: UTC+1 (Central European Time)
- Postal code: 53260 Brinje

Brinje is a settlement and a municipality in Lika-Senj County, Croatia. It is located about 20 kilometres (12 mi) east of Senj and 60 kilometres (37 mi) north of Gospić.

== Geography ==
The town is formed around a castle called Sokolac, which contains one of the most well preserved Gothic chapels in Croatia, St. Marys, which dates back to the 14th century. Sokolac Castle in the town is named after the Croatian word for falcon (sokol), which appears on the town's coat of arms.

== Climate ==
Since records began in 1997, the highest temperature recorded at the local weather station was 38.0 °C (100.4 °F), on 3 August 2017. The coldest temperature was −27.5 °C (−17.5 °F), on 13 January 2003.

== History ==
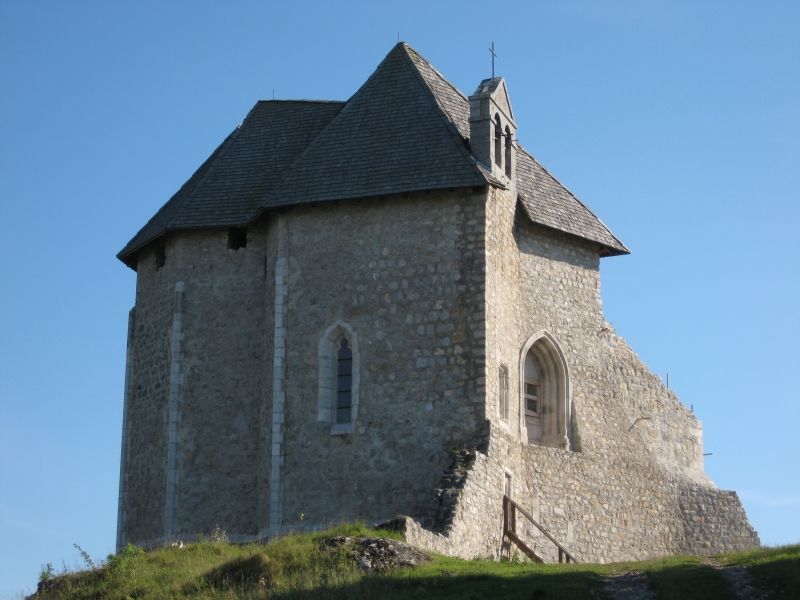
Sokolac Castle

Brinje's history dates back to medieval times, while the town was held by the noble Frankopan and Gorjanski families. Brinje was important medieval fortified city held by Frenkopan family.

In 1507, the monk Bartol of Brinje left a graffito on the wall of the Sv. Antona church in Bale.

In the 16th century, Brinje became a part of the Austrian Military Frontier Known commanders of Brinje in that period include:

1. Juraj Gusić (1542)
2. Franjo Mudrovčić (1550)
3. Gašpar Starešinić (1602–1620)
4. Tomica Holjevac (1644–1653), burgrave
5. Andrija Semenić (1689)
6. Gabro Aichelburg (1702)
7. Franjo Aichelburg (1717–1723)
8. Ivan Mihael Floriančić (1732)

In the late 19th century and early 20th century, Brinje was part of the Lika-Krbava County of the Kingdom of Croatia-Slavonia.

It is some 60 km north of Gospić, on once important road, the "Josephina", passing from the hinterland through the Kapela pass towards the coast in Senj. The new highway that is built brought much needed prosperity to Brinje.

== Population ==
In 2021, the municipality had 2,563 residents in the following 12 settlements:

- Brinje, population 1250
- Glibodol, population 7
- Jezerane, population 270
- Križ Kamenica, population 173
- Križpolje, population 392
- Letinac, population 95
- Lipice, population 94
- Prokike, population 63
- Rapain Klanac, population 6
- Stajnica, population 164
- Vodoteč, population 33
- Žuta Lokva, population 16
Brinje: Population trends 1857–2021
v

population	15382	15440	15239	16319	17747	18253	17113	16102	13117	11961	9726	8519	6564	6035	4108	3256	2563
	1857	1869	1880	1890	1900	1910	1921	1931	1948	1953	1961	1971	1981	1991	2001	2011	2021

Sources: Croatian Bureau of Statistics publications

By ethnicity, 93% were Croats, 6% Serbs (census 2011).

== Culture ==
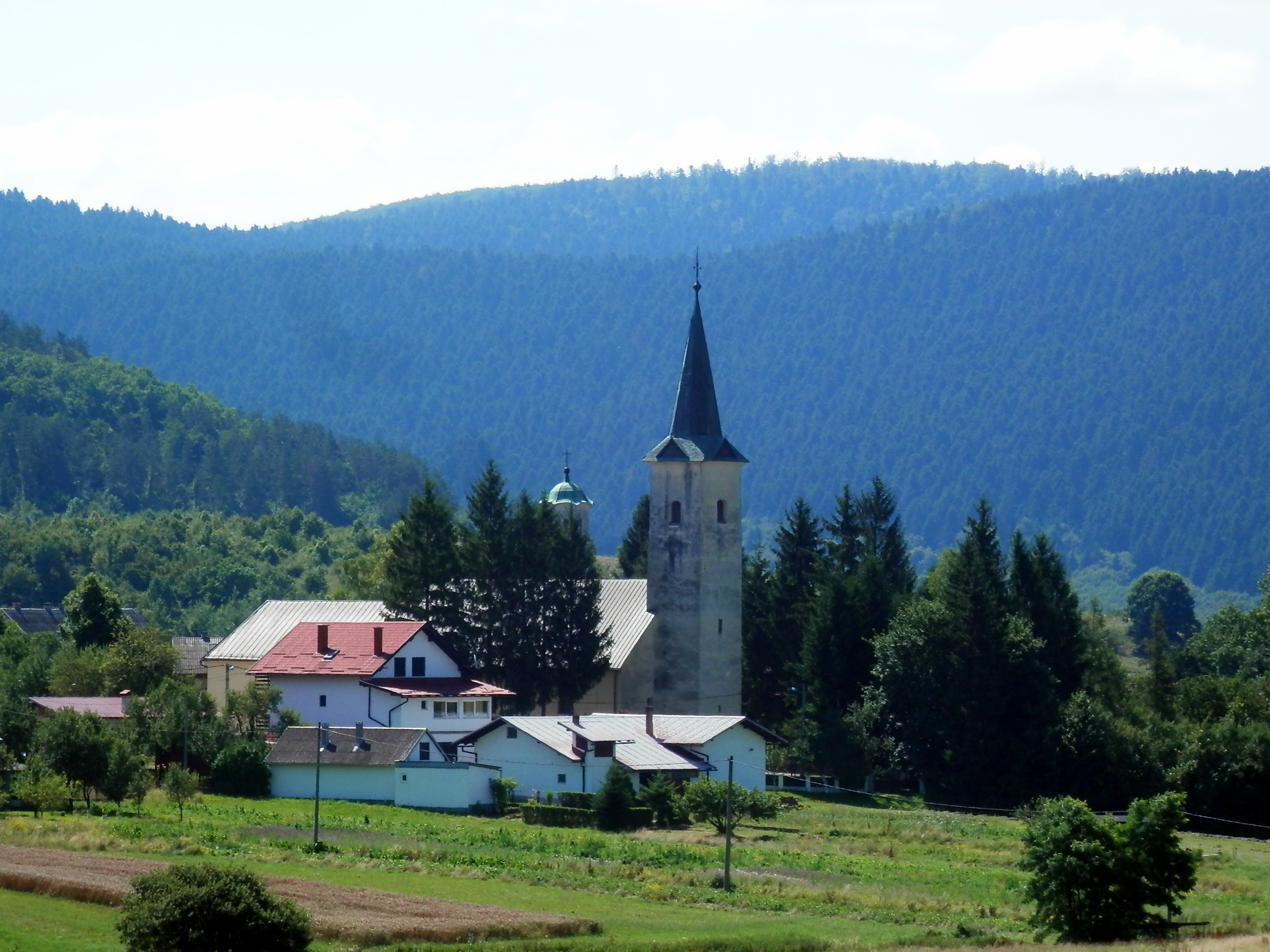
View of Brinje

The municipality is one of several in the Lika region where Čakavian dialect is spoken.

== Attractions ==
=== Gravestone of Matijaš Čubranić ===
There is a Glagolitic gravestone dated 15 May 1518, commemorating Matijaš Čubranić. According to its first publisher Ivan Kukuljević Sakcinski, there was a tradition that it was originally in the Sv. Vida church before being brought to the current parish church, Blažene Djevice Marije. The gravestone was destroyed in World War II and now only a fragment remains, found in 1958 by parish priest Ivan Kranjčec.

Ⱍ Ⱇ Ⰷ Ⰹ ⰮⰋⰔⰅⰜⰀ ⰮⰀⰡ
ⰐⰀ ⰄⰀⰐ ·Ⰴ·Ⰹ· ⰁⰋ ⰒⰑⰔⰕⰀⰂⰎⰅⰐⰀ
ⰞⰍⰓⰋⰎⰬ·ⰐⰀ ⰃⰓⰑⰁ·ⰍⰐⰅⰈⰀ ⰮⰀⰕⰋⰡⰞⰀ
ⰝⰖⰁⰓⰀⰐⰋⰛⰀ·ⰂⰅⰓⰐⰑⰃⰀ ⰍⰐⰅⰈⰖ ⰀⰐⰕⰋ
Ⰰ ⰕⰑ·ⰖⰝⰋⰐⰋ·ⰐⰅⰃⰑⰂⰀ ⰃⰑⰔⰒⰀ ⰮⰀⰓ
ⰃⰀⰓⰋⰕⰀ·ⰋⰐⰅⰃⰑⰂⰬ ⰔⰋⰐⰑⰂⰀⰜ ⰞⰋⰮⰖⰐ

In the inscription, ⰃⰓ (GR) is written as a ligature. Branko Fučić published a reproduction of the inscription in 1982.

== Sports ==
The local chapter of the HPS is HPD "Škamnica", which had 24 members in 1936 under the Josip Frölich presidency. Membership was the same in 1937. Membership fell to 21 in 1938, remaining the same in 1939.

== Politics ==
=== Minority councils and representatives ===
Directly elected minority councils and representatives are tasked with consulting tasks for the local or regional authorities in which they are advocating for minority rights and interests, integration into public life and participation in the management of local affairs. At the 2023 Croatian national minorities councils and representatives elections Serbs of Croatia fulfilled legal requirements to elect 10 members minority council of the Municipality of Brinje but the elections were not held due to the absence of candidatures.

== Notable natives and residents ==
- Josif Rajačić
- Franjo Brozinčević
- Davor Lasić

== Bibliography ==
- Grahovac-Pražić, Vesna; Vrcić-Mataija, Sanja (2010). "Ojkonimi gospićkog područja" (PDF). Folia Onomastica Croatica (in Croatian) (19): 81–96.
- Fras, Franz Julius (1835). "Bründler-Kompagnie" [Brinje Company]. Vollständige Topographie der Karlstädter-Militärgrenze mit besonderer Rücksicht auf die Beschreibung der Schlösser, Ruinen, Inscriptionen und andern dergleichen Ueberbleibseln von Antiquitäten: nach Anschauung und aus den zuverlässigsten Quellen dargestellt für reisende, und zur Förderung der Vaterlandsliebe (in German). Zagreb: Franz Suppan. pp. 285–289.
