= John Both de Bajna =

Hungarian nobleman

Baron John Both de Bajna (Croatian: Ivan Bot od Bajne, Hungarian: bajnai Both János ; ? – 1493) was a Hungarian nobleman from the Both family, who served as, alongside Emeric Derencsényi, Ban of Croatia, Slavonia and Dalmatia in 1493. His brother, Andrew Both also acted as ban from 1504 to 1507. Lord of Sykava in 1492, John was killed in the siege of Brinje in 1493.

He married Apollonia Csapy, daughter of the nobleman Andrew Csapy, captain of the castle of Szentgyörgy in the Zala County between approx. 1441, and 1448. The familyname of Apollonia Csapy's mother is unknown, as in all the charts she appears only as "Helene". Apollonia's sister, Helen Csapy, married George Forster de Szenterzsébet. From John Both and Apollonia Csapy's union comes János Both of Bajna (†1521), Vice-Ban of Croatia, captain of the fortress of Belgrade (nándorfehérvári vicebáró); he is killed by the army of Suleiman the Magnificent August 29, 1521.

Political offices
Preceded by Ladislaus Egervári	Ban of Croatia alongside Emeric Derencsényi; 1493	Succeeded by Ladislaus Kanizsai
