= Ledenice, Croatia =

Ledenice
- Village
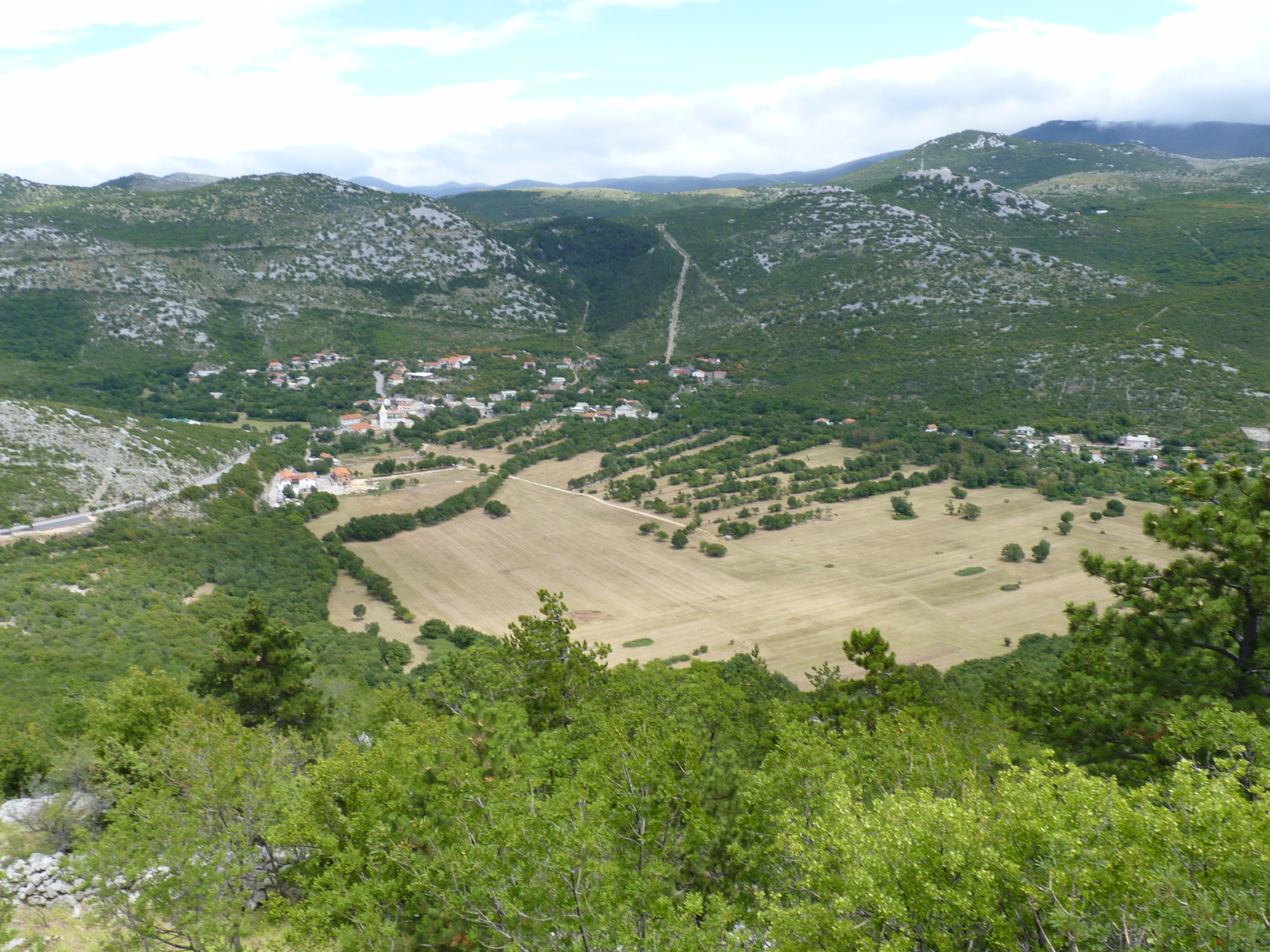
- A view of Ledenice from Ledenice Castle

- Location within Croatia
- Coordinates: 45.142°N 15.843°E
- Country: Croatia
- County: Primorje-Gorski Kotar County
- City: Novi Vinodolski

Area
  - Total: 7 km^{2} (2.7 sq mi)

Population (2021)
  - Total: 164
  - Density: 23/km^{2} (61/sq mi)
- Time zone: UTC+1 (CET)
  - Summer (DST): UTC+2 (CEST)
- Postal code: 51250
- Area code: +385 051

Ledenice is a village in Croatia, under the Novi Vinodolski township, in Primorje-Gorski Kotar County.

== History ==
Franz Julius Fras speculated, without corroborating evidence, that the castle had been built during the First Mongol invasion of Hungary in 1241, and so doubted the sources that stated it was built by Stjepan III Frankopan Modruški in 1450.

Ledenice was mentioned on 22 February 1481 in a document freeing the citizens of Grič from tariffs in Ledenice and elsewhere.

Along with Senj, Fras suggested the castle of Ledenice contributed greatly to the defence of Vinodol from the Turkish invasions.

Relative safety returned after the reconquest of Lika in 1689, following which the significantly drier Velebit/Kapela mountains were depopulated as people moved into the valleys with their numerous springs. Ledenice remained the seat of a Captainate under Senj, but after the last known burgrave, Skradiniani, the castle fell into disrepair.

The castle of Ledenice was in ruins by 1835.

== Demographics ==
Village of Ledenice: Population trends 1857–2021
v

population	537	1474	605	658	723	695	631	568	468	449	379	317	214	181	172	173	164
	1857	1869	1880	1890	1900	1910	1921	1931	1948	1953	1961	1971	1981	1991	2001	2011	2021

Note:Includes in 1869 data for the village of Bater, and partially so for 1880. In 1857 and 1869 it includes data for the village of Breze, and partially so for 1880. In 1869 it included data for the villages of Crno and Klenovica. From 1910 to 1931, part of its data is under Crno. Sources: Croatian Bureau of Statistics publications

In 1835, Ledenice belonged to Krmpote. It had 97 houses, with a population of 969. Its residents were Catholic.

== Governance ==
=== Local ===
It is the seat of the Local Committee of Ledenice, encompassing itself, Bater, Breze and Crno.

== Infrastructure ==
An old road used to run from Vitunj over Lumbarda mountain through Bjelsko (by Potok Musulinski) and Gvozd to Drežnica, and from there to Ledenica and Bribir.

== Gallery ==
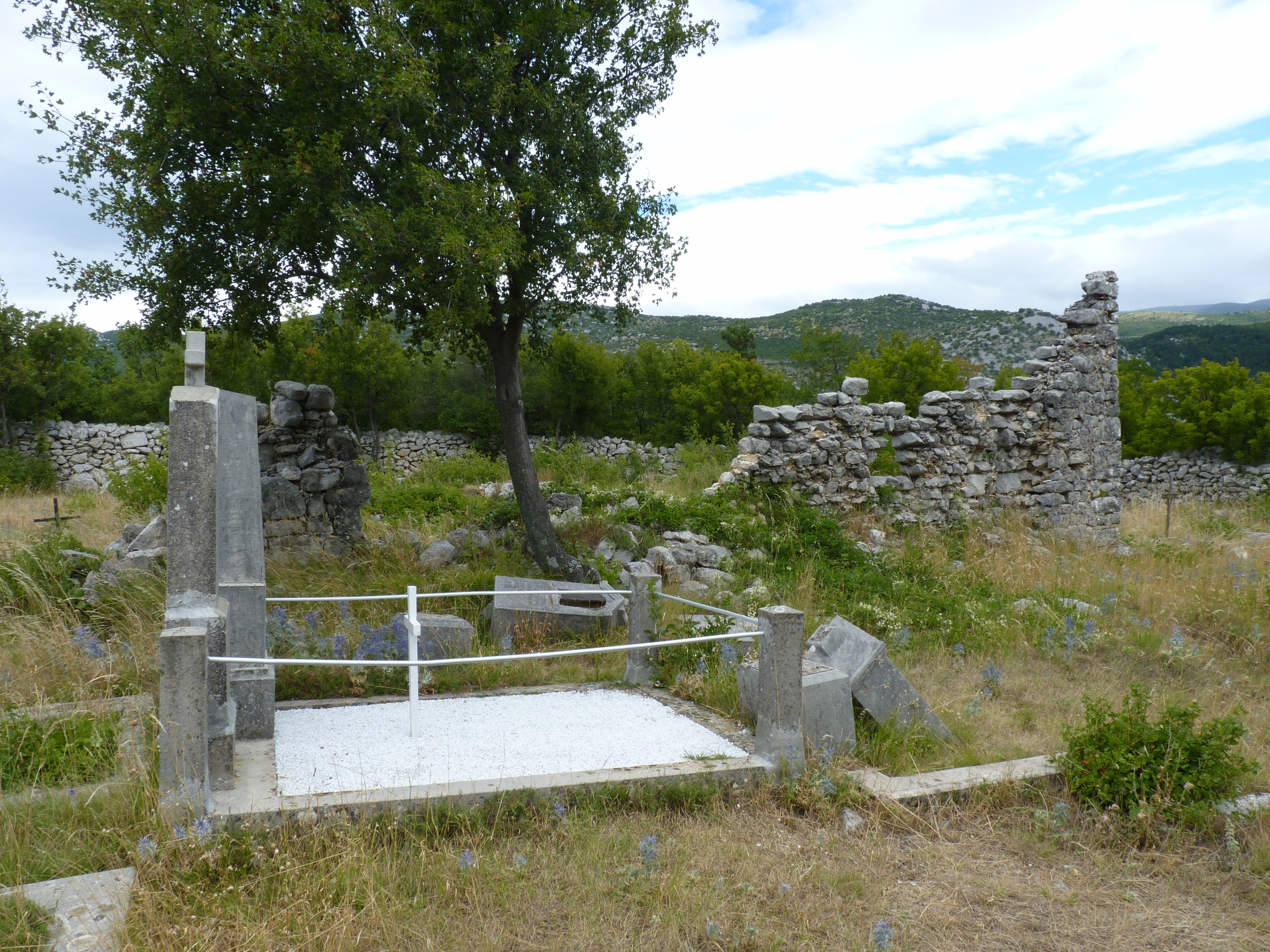
Cemetery
