= Zagon =

Zagon may refer to:

- Zagon, Covasna, a commune in Covasna County, Romania
- Zagon (river), a tributary of the Covasna in Romania
- Zagon, Postojna, a village in Slovenia
- Miklós Zágon (1920–1984), Hungarian rower
- S3V Zagon, a Russian torpedo
- Donji Zagon, a village near Novi Vinodolski, Croatia
- Gornji Zagon, a village near Novi Vinodolski, Croatia
