= Smokvica =

Smokvica may refer to:

- Smokvica, Korčula, a village and municipality in Dubrovnik-Neretva County, Croatia
- Smokvica, Gevgelija, a village in North Macedonia
- Smokvica, Koper, a village in the City Municipality of Koper, Slovenia
- Smokvica, Pag, a village in Zadar County, Croatia
- Smokvica Krmpotska, a village near Novi Vinodolski, Croatia
