= Bater =

Bater may refer to:

== People ==
- Bater (surname)
- Bagatur (born 1955), Chinese politician

== Places ==
- Bater, Croatia, a village near Novi Vinodolski
- Bater, Lebanon, a municipality of Lebanon
