= Klek mountain, Croatia =

Mountain

Klek
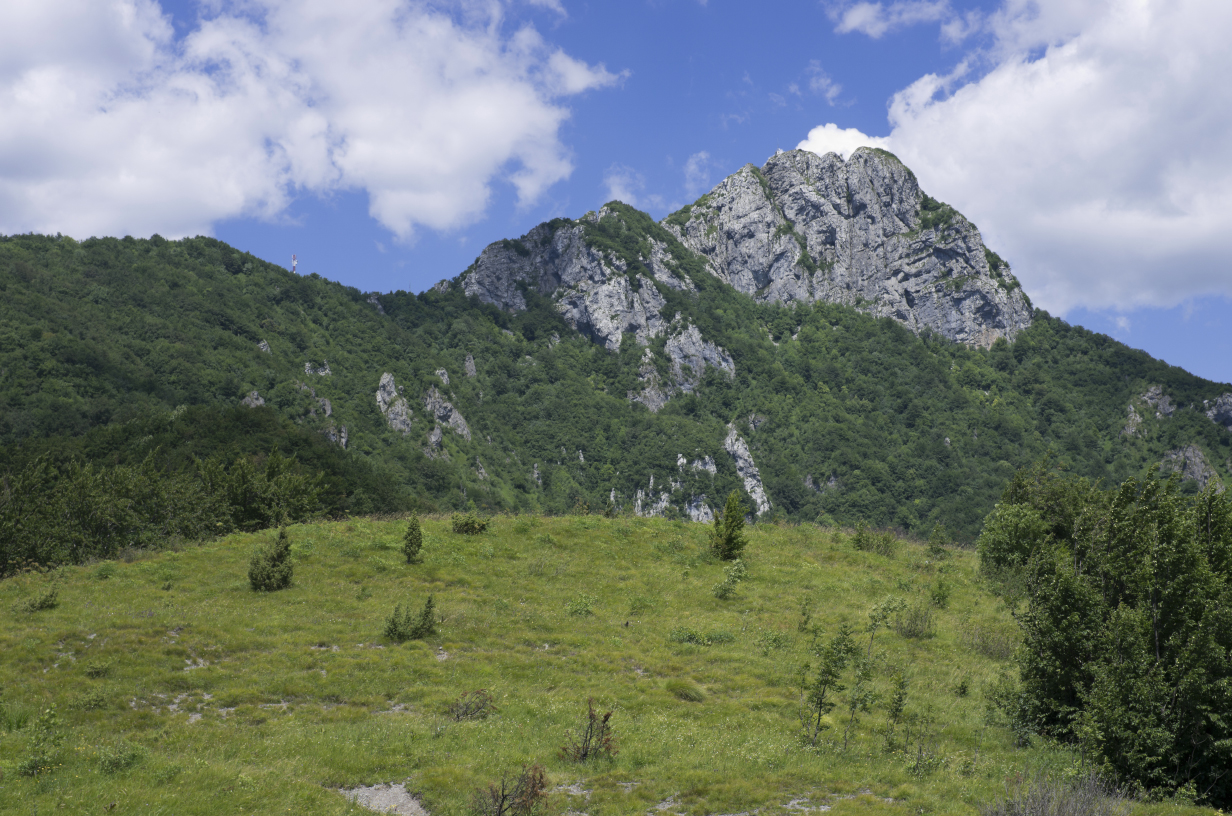
- Mt. Klek as seen from the southeast

Highest point
- Elevation: 1,181 m (3,875 ft)
- Coordinates: 45°15′31″N 15°8′44″E

Geography
- Location within Croatia
- Location: Croatia
- Parent range: Velika Kapela, Dinaric Alps

Climbing
- Easiest route: Hike

Klek is a mountain in north-western Croatia, near Ogulin in Karlovac County. It is the easternmost mountain of the Velika Kapela range of the Dinaric Alps.

This mountain is one of the best-known Croatian botanist reserves and home to a number of protected species of mountain flora.

From its summit, the entire Ogulin-Plaški valley is visible.

According to the 17th century tale, during the nights of storm, the summit of Klek is a midnight gathering point for witches and fairies.

In the early 20th century, Klek's east and south face nurtured numerous rock climbers. The longest route is 150 metres (490 ft), with difficulty up to 7b+ (5.12c).

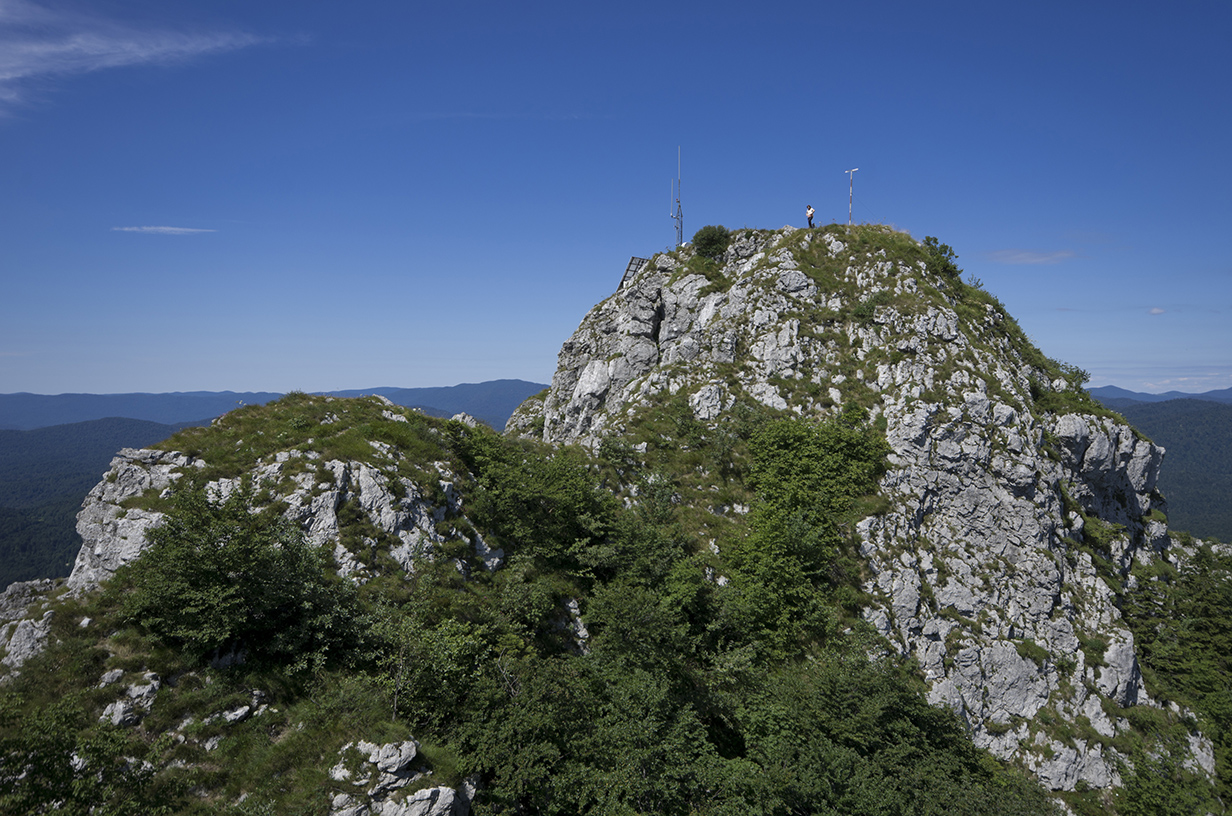
Peak of Klek mountain

== Geography and geology ==
Klek is positioned as a prominent ridge on the eastern tips of Velika Kapela, and its slopes descend toward Ogulin and the valley of Dobra. The peaks are steep and rocky, and there are two most important ones, Klečica/Klečice or Mali Klek (1058 m), and Veliki Klek (or just Klek, 1182 m), with its prominent vertical 200 meters high "southern rock".

Klek rose during the Alpine orogeny in Tertiary, and geologically it consists of carbon sediments, i.e. Jurassic limestone and dolomite, while the peak part is made of Cretaceous limestones.

There are several speleological objects on the massif: the Horvat's or Klek cave (Klečka spilja in Croatian), the Half-cave (Polupećina in Croatian), the Jarunčica na Zakopi pit cave, and two pits found in this century, the Witch's pit cave (133 m deep), and another one whose entry is near the peak, at the height of 1162 m.

The climate is mountain with heavy rainfall, which encourages the formation of seeping and torrent streams that gather in Klek's ravine (Klečka draga in Croatian) or Peras' gulch (Perasov jarak in Croatian). Behind Peras' gulch on the northern slope of Klek there is also a ruin of the old Frankopan castle Vitunj, above a village named the same.

== Climate ==
A weather station exists there at an elevation of 1,000 metres (3,300 ft). The minimum recorded temperature for the winter of 2024–2025 was −9.4 °C (15.1 °F), on February 19th.

== Flora ==
In the Podklek, Klek, and Klečica areas there are stretches of Krummholz vegetation.

Species found on Klek include Achillea clavennae, Aconitum napellus, Afragene alpina, Allium carinatum A. ericetorum, Arabis scopoliana, Atadinus pumilus, Athamanta cretensis, Campanula rotundifolia, Cerastium decalvans, Dianthus sternbergii, Edraianthus graminifolius, Gentiana acaulis, Juniperus sabina, Primula kitaibeliana, P. vulgaris, Rhododendron hirsutum, Rosa alpina, Saxifraga paniculata, and Scrophularia laciniata.

== History ==
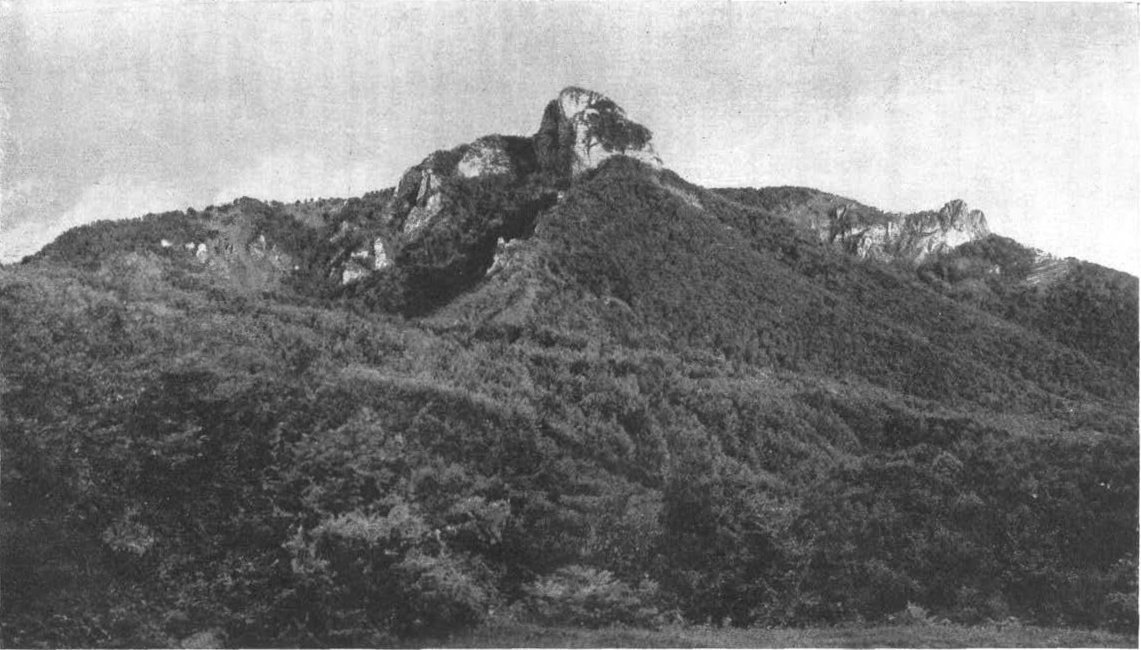
Klek in 1935

When the Vlachs of Gomirje requested a confirmation of their Uskok rights throughout the territory they inhabited in 1605, they listed its boundaries as stretching from Mali Klek – Ustanke (the confluence of the Vitunjčica and the Dobra) – Vrbica – Kamensko – Vrbovsko – Plešivica – Mošenski – Bilek – "Potschovodo" – Topolovica – Okrugljik – Radigojna – Gornji Lazi.

In April 1898, Alberto Weber wrote a poem titled "Klek":

Iznad munjâ, oblakâ i triesa
Orijaški, poput kamen diva,
Sanak vječni spokojno što sniva,
Klek se gordi diže put nebesâ

Veličajan sred mira i biesa,
Časak rujan u sunašcu pliva,
Čas mu glavu našem vidu skriva,
Tmasto velo, leglo urnebesa.

Kršna roda ponosita slika,
Alem kamen hrvatskijeh gorâ,
Ne ima mu ravna taka lika,

Od Crnoga do Jadranskog mora
Sokolovâ timor i slobode,
Na njem vile svoje kolo vode

On 4 June 1898, a botanical and entomological expedition consisting of Dragutin Hirc, Nikola Faller and August Langhoffer left Zagreb with the intent of ascending Klek, among others. In Ogulin, they met up with local guide Josip Magdić Sr., K. Harambašić, (Note: Teacher and editor-in-chief of Ogulinski Viestnik.), forester A. Čop, botanist Antun Heinz and two alpinists from Zagreb. They left for Klek at 5:00 on the 5th, beginning their ascent from the house of Đure Milanović not far from Musulin Potok. They reached the peak by 10:00, remaining there until noon, returning by way of Perasov jarak to the base and from there to Ogulin, where they held a presentation of their findings in the "Frankopan" inn, including before the mjestni načelnik Vukelić and the former predsjednik kraljevskog sudbenog stola in Ogulin. Inspired by the presentation, the župan and veterinarian Fink (Note: Who also equipped the path to Klek with stairs.) joined together with two of his nephews an expedition that climbed Klek on 14 August, consisting of HPS president Miroslav Kulmer Jr., vice president Milan Lenuci, Franjo Marković, Mrs. Seifertova (Note: Wife of županijski nadinžinir Adolf Seifert.) and a certain Severinski as their photographer, guided by A. Čop. This second expedition was written about in Ogulin's Viesnik newspaper.

On 1 October 1900, Antun Heinz and his assistant and a friend went on a botanical expedition to Klek, guided by Ante Kostelić of Sveti Jakov. They left around 7:30, reaching the inn before Musulinski Potok in an hour and reaching Zorin mir around 10:00. They reached the top around 13:00, staying about an hour before descending the same way they had ascended.

Due to its proximity to the capital city of Zagreb, Klek became a popular climbing destination. The first ascents came in 1917.

On 9 April 1927, Etelka Hagenreiter, a young alpinist (since 1924) from Okučani who once lived with her parents in nearby. Plaški, died on the southern Klečica, attempting to climb its cliffs with 2 others. She was supposed to be on the northern Klečica, but appears to have become lost. Once the group on the northern Klečica got her attention, she sat down and watched them, as a certain L. led a group south to get her. They lost sight of her once they reached the saddle between the two. As they prepared their rope to climb, wind and rain hit Klečice, forcing the rescuers to shelter beneath an overhang. From where he was on the northern Klečica, a certain N. Ć. thought he saw her fall from the cliff and rushed to join the rescuers. Upon reaching them, L. informed him that she was not at the top of the southern Klečica any more, and that he presumed she had found a rock shelter in the rain. N. Ć. rapidly scaled the southern Klečica, confirming her absence. Eventually, the group located her body 200 metres (660 ft) below part of the cliff beneath the highest point on the peak, her skull in pieces. She had slipped on wet rock, and fallen to her death. Her body was retrieved by the group with the assistance of 3 villagers and taken by train to Zagreb, where she was buried in the Mirogoj Cemetery.

On 19 February 1939, Ivan Bumba, Slavko Brezovečki and Emilij Laszowski ascended the southeast head of Klek by a new route, HPD, a route repeated in 1940 by a team including the future HPS povjerenik, the Ustaša Slavko Prebendar. In May and June 1939, Marijan Dragman and Brezovečki climbed the southeast head of Klek by two new routes.

In 1941, despite 110 ascents by the Alpinism Division of the HPD "Zagreb", they were only carried out on Klek and Čvrsnica. Already in 1942, even Klek was no longer safe enough, forcing Zagreb's Alpinism Division to climb only on Medvednica, Samoborsko gorje, Zagorje and in the Tatras. In 1943, the HPS was further limited to just West and Central Medvednica.

In 1953, Ivo Babić-Gjalski died on Klek.

In 1954, Drago Belačić died on Klek.

In the spring of 1958, the roof of the mountain hut on Klek was finally finished. The idea to build a mountain hut on Klek came shortly before WWI, but despite continued attempts in the Kingdom of Yugoslavia, the unrealised idea had to be revived after WWII when the PD "Zagreb" built a bivouac beneath a rock shelter near the peak. The PD "Klek" Turković Selo turned the bivouac into a mountain hut. The president of the HPS, Vjećeslav Holjevac, visited the mountain hut for its opening. The mountain hut had a cistern (Croatian: rosnica), and once Bjelsko and Musulin Potok were electrified, it was planned to introduce electric lighting.

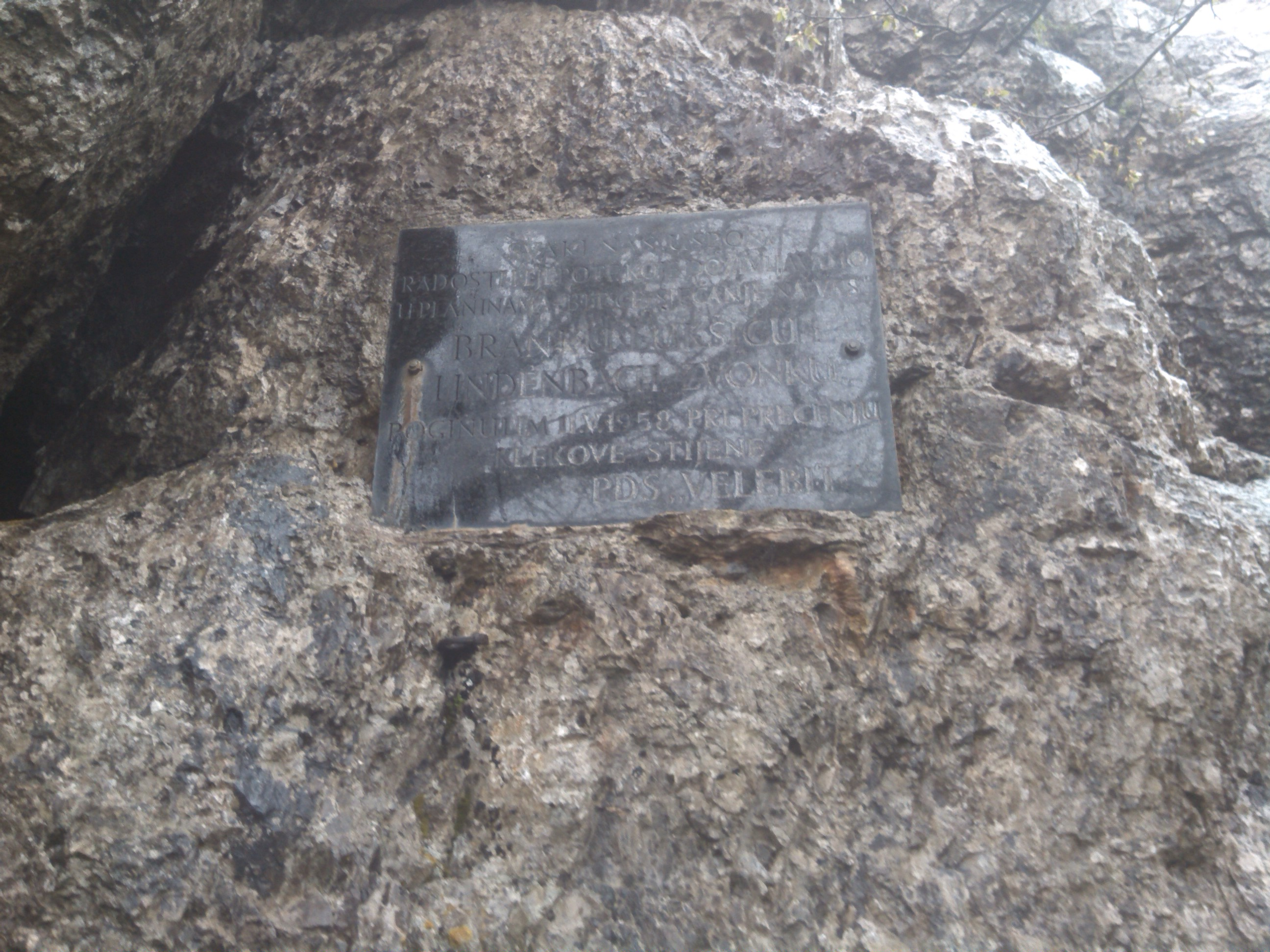
Memorial plaque

On 11 May 1958, alpinists Branko Lukšić and Zvonimir Lindenbach died on the Tonkina priječnica while attempting an ascent of Klek. On 28 September 1958, a mountain hut built on Vidova gora was named after Lukšić in his memory, and its memorial plaque was moved to the new mountain hut when the old one was destroyed in 1972. On 7 July 1960, Davor Ribarović and Anton Filipčić ascended a new route up Klek, naming it Bankov smjer. The PDS Velebit placed a memorial plaque at the exit from Tonkina priječnica honouring Lučić and Lindenbach, reading:

SVAKI NAŠ USPON
RADOSTI I LJEPOTE KOJE DOŽIVLJAMO
U PLANINAMA BIT ĆE SJEĆANJE NA VAS
BRANKU LUKŠIĆU I
LINDENBACH ZVONKU
POGINULIM 11.V.1958 PRI PREČENJU
KLEKOVE STIJENE
PDS "VELEBIT"

In 1963, Mirko Frey died on Klek.

Južna stijena topo. From left to right: Omladinski, Tajanstveni, HPD-ov, Žoharov stup, Dragmanov, Glava

By the late 1970s, Klek was an established training wall for Velebitaši. (Note: Members of PDS Velebit.) Zdenko Anić typically took his trainees to HPD-ov smjer "Hapedejka" (5a). During one such training in 1980, which was Boris Čujić's first exposure to rock climbing, an accident occurred on the nearby Omladinski smjer (5a), on which a young Varaždin native, Dražen Košić, who had been assigned the task of leading a course despite not being an instructor became entangled in his rope, which choked him to death. Attempts to revive him were unsuccessful. The event shook all the PDS Velebit trainees, and so only half the number showed up for the next outing.

In 1999, the HSS installed a memorial stone with plaque to the 7 alpinists who have died on Klek, in the Ogulin castle park.

In 2023, a new via ferrata was installed near the peak of Klek, of difficulty A with two B/C sections requiring some arm strength.

== Climbing ==
Klek's more significant cliffs are 20–140 metres (66–459 ft) tall, with a N-NE-E-SE-S exposure, making them suitable for climbing almost year-round, but less so in winter. They feature ledges, jugs, and cracks, but few slopers or pockets, and little tufa. It is not suitable for children.

The South Wall (Serbo-Croatian: Južna stijena) of Klek is of poor quality for the development of sport climbing routes, but Potklek is of much higher quality rock. Over 60 routes have been climbed to date.

List of sport climbing routes on Klek
Sector	Route	Length (m)	Grade (French)	Grade (YDS)	FA	FA date	First ascenders	Notes
C (Note: 45.260°N 15.143°E)	Mala Monika	15	6c+	5.11c/d				
C	Sara	15	6a+	5.10b				
Vjetrometina (Note: 45.261°N 15.143°E)	Pukotina - Brid	20	5a	5.7/8				
Vjetrometina	Špajza indirekt	20	6c	5.11b				
Vjetrometina	Od blata do neba	23	6a+	5.10b				
Vjetrometina	Marica	21	6b	5.10c				
E (Note: 45.261°N 15.144°E)	Dojdi brzo!	25	7a+	5.12a	Boris Čujić			
E	?	25	6a	5.10a				
E	??	25	6c	5.11b				

List of multi-pitch routes on Klek
Sector	Route	Length (m)	Grade (French)	Pitch grades	Grade (YDS)	FA	FA date	FFA	Notes
Potklek A (Note: 45.258°N 15.145°E)	Baciljček	80	6c	6c, 4b	5.11b	Franc Knez, Matjaž Pečovnik			
Potklek B (Note: 45.259°N 15.144°E)	Vrijeskova pločica	65	5c	5b, 5a, 5c	5.9	Borislav Aleraj, Branko Šeparović			
Vjetrometina	Nadzornik Eldar	23	5a		5.7/8				
E	List	70	5a/b	[4b, 4b, 4b] (Note: old)	5.5	Franc Knez, Alojz Cajzek			
E	Ogledalo	80	6a+		5.10b				
E	More snova	90	6b+	5c, 6a, 6b+	5.11a	Franc Knez, Alojz Cajzek			
E	Bolečina	90	7b+	7a, 7b+, 5a	5.12c	Franc Knez, Martin Hrastnik			
E	Banana	80	6c	6c, 6a, 5a	5.11b	Franc Knez, Martin Hrastnik			Filmed ascent 18 May 2024.
E	HPD 90	80	6a	6a, 5c, 5a	5.10a	Stanko Gilić, Kazimir Sambolec			Filmed ascent 17 May 2024.
E	Mangupski	60	6a		5.10a				
E	Rodila mama šeprtlju	60	5b	5b, 5a	5.8				
E	Izgubljene iluzije	40	6a	5c, 6a	5.10a				
Južna stijena (Note: 45.260°N 15.145°E)	Omladinski	120	5a	4b, 5a, 3+, 4b+, 4b	5.7/8	Emilij Laszowski II, S. Brlečić, Josip Mesarić			Filmed ascents in July 2021 and January 2022. Chossy.
Južna stijena	Tajanstveni	145	7a+	5a, 7a+, 5a, 5c, 3+	5.12a	Marijan Čepelak, Miroslav Pleško, Nenad Čulić, Borislav Aleraj			
Južna stijena	HPD-ov smjer	150	5a		5.7/8				Ends at the peak of Klek.
Južna stijena	Žoharov stup	140	6a+	3, 6a+, 6a, 5b, 6a, 4c	5.10b	Zvonko Pašer, Zlatko Smerke			Filmed ascent 30 May 2021.
Južna stijena	Dragmanov smjer	130	5b/c		5.8/9		1935-09-05		Filmed ascent July 2021.
Južna stijena	Glava	150	5b	5a, 3+, 5b, 4b, 3+	5.8	Slavo Brezovečki, Marijan Dragman			Filmed ascent July 2020.

== Events ==
Traditionally, climbers nationwide ascend Klek on the first Sunday after the New Year.

== See also ==
- List of mountains in Croatia

== Bibliography ==
=== Alpinism ===
- theCrag (2025). "Sport Climbing". The Crag. Klek, sport climbing.
- Grbac Lacković, Lukas (2024b). "Banana, Klek". YouTube.
- Grbac Lacković, Lukas (2024a). "HPD 90, Klek". YouTube.
- Hike & Travel (2023-03-21). "Klek new ferrata, Croatia (4K)". YouTube.
- Štedul Fabac, Kristina (2023-01-08). "Planinari sudjelovali na tradicionalnoj proslavi planinarske Nove godine usponom na Klek". YouTube. Večernji list.
- Glumac, Goran (2022-01-20). "Klek, južna stijena, Omladinski smjer, multipitch rock climbing". YouTube (in Serbo-Croatian).
- Afrofeet (2021-07-26). "Klek, Omladinski smjer". YouTube.
- Pišo (2021-05-31). "Bajsom na Sljeme i penja Klek". YouTube.
- Pnet (n.d.). "Plezališče Klek". Plezanje.net. Archived from the original on 2025-08-28.
- HSS (2020) [1999]. "Poginuli na Kleku". Ogulin.hr (in Serbo-Croatian). Archived from the original on 2021-01-26.
- Čujić, Boris (2020). "Klekisti" [Klekists]. Zlatne godine [Golden Years] (in Serbo-Croatian). Zagreb: Libricon. pp. 17–23. ISBN 978-953-8017-12-4.
- Salopek, Danijel (2020-01-06). "HPD-ov smjer". Plezanje.net (in Serbo-Croatian). Archived from the original on 2025-08-28.
- Rafaj, Bojan (2016-07-04). "Penjački izlet – Klek". Riječki alpinistički klub. Archived from the original on 2020-10-20.
- Lajtman, Ivan (2011-07-01). "Rodila mama šeprtlju". Plezanje.net (in Serbo-Croatian). Archived from the original on 2025-08-28.
- Čujić, Boris (2001). "Klek". Croatia: Penjački vodič [Croatia: Climbing guide] (in Serbo-Croatian) (4th ed.). Zagreb: Astroida. pp. 106–112. ISBN 953-97271-7-0.
- Poljak, Željko (February 1959). "Klek". Kazalo za "Hrvatski planinar" i "Naše planine" 1898—1958 (PDF). Naše planine. Vol. XI. pp. 8–9. ISSN 0354-0650.
- Zgaga, Mirko (1948) [written 1948-12-07]. "Nova varijanta u Klekovoj stijeni" (PDF). Naše planine. Vol. I, no. 1. pp. 21–24. ISSN 0354-0650.
- Ć., N. (1927). "Prva žrtva Kleka" (PDF). Hrvatski planinar (in Serbo-Croatian). Vol. 23, no. 4–5. pp. 70–71. ISSN 0354-0650.
- Urednik (1927-04-09). "† Etelka Hagenreiter". Glas Hrvata. Archived from the original on 2022-08-08.

=== Biology ===
- Šašić, Martina; Nahirnić, Ana; Tarmann, Gerhard M. (2016-12-31). "Zygaenidae (Lepidoptera) in the Lepidoptera collections of the Croatian Natural History Museum". Natura Croatica: Periodicum Musei Historiae Naturalis Croatici. 25 (2): 233–248. doi:10.20302/NC.2016.25.19. eISSN 1848-7386.

=== Videography ===
- Molany (2024-01-29). "Klek (Ogulin)". YouTube.
- Mrcine Outdoor (2022-07-15). "Klek i Klečice". YouTube.
- Wild Balkans (2021-09-18). "Uspon na Klek i panorama dronom 4K". YouTube.
- Dragičević, Dubravko (2021-08-17). "Planina KLEK - HPD Klek Ogulin". YouTube. Turistička zajednica Grada Ogulina.
- Niki68 (2021-07-13). "Rock climbing Dragman route on Klek". YouTube.
- Ćurković, Jure (2021-06-23). "Klek - Kolijevka hrvatskog planinarstva". YouTube (in Serbo-Croatian).
- Orešković, Zoran (2020-10-26). "Mala planinarska škola - Klek". YouTube (in Serbo-Croatian).
- One Step More (2020-10-14). "Klek - in the land of witches". YouTube.
- Niki68 (2020-07-22). "Rock climbing Glava on Južna stijena - Klek". YouTube.
- Hiking Croatia (2020-05-19). "Klek, div iz Ogulina". YouTube (in Serbo-Croatian).
- Jajčević, Ivan (2020-05-18). "Klek mountain". YouTube.
- Nikola (2020-01-23). "Klek - The Sleeping Giant". YouTube. CC BY.
- Jurina, Mario (2019-04-28). "Vrhovi - Klek". YouTube.
- Kodžoman, Krunoslav (2017-06-18). "Klek iz zraka". YouTube.
- Brcković, Marko (2015-09-20). "Klek planina, Hrvatska; pogled iz zraka". YouTube (in Serbo-Croatian). Filmed with a quadcopter.
- Rataj, Tomislav (2014-02-22). "Klek". YouTube. Turistička zajednica Grada Ogulina.
- Korač, Alen (2009-03-31). "01 07 2007.Klek-Ogulin". YouTube.
