= Novi Vinodolski =

- Town
- Grad Novi Vinodolski; Town of Novi Vinodolski
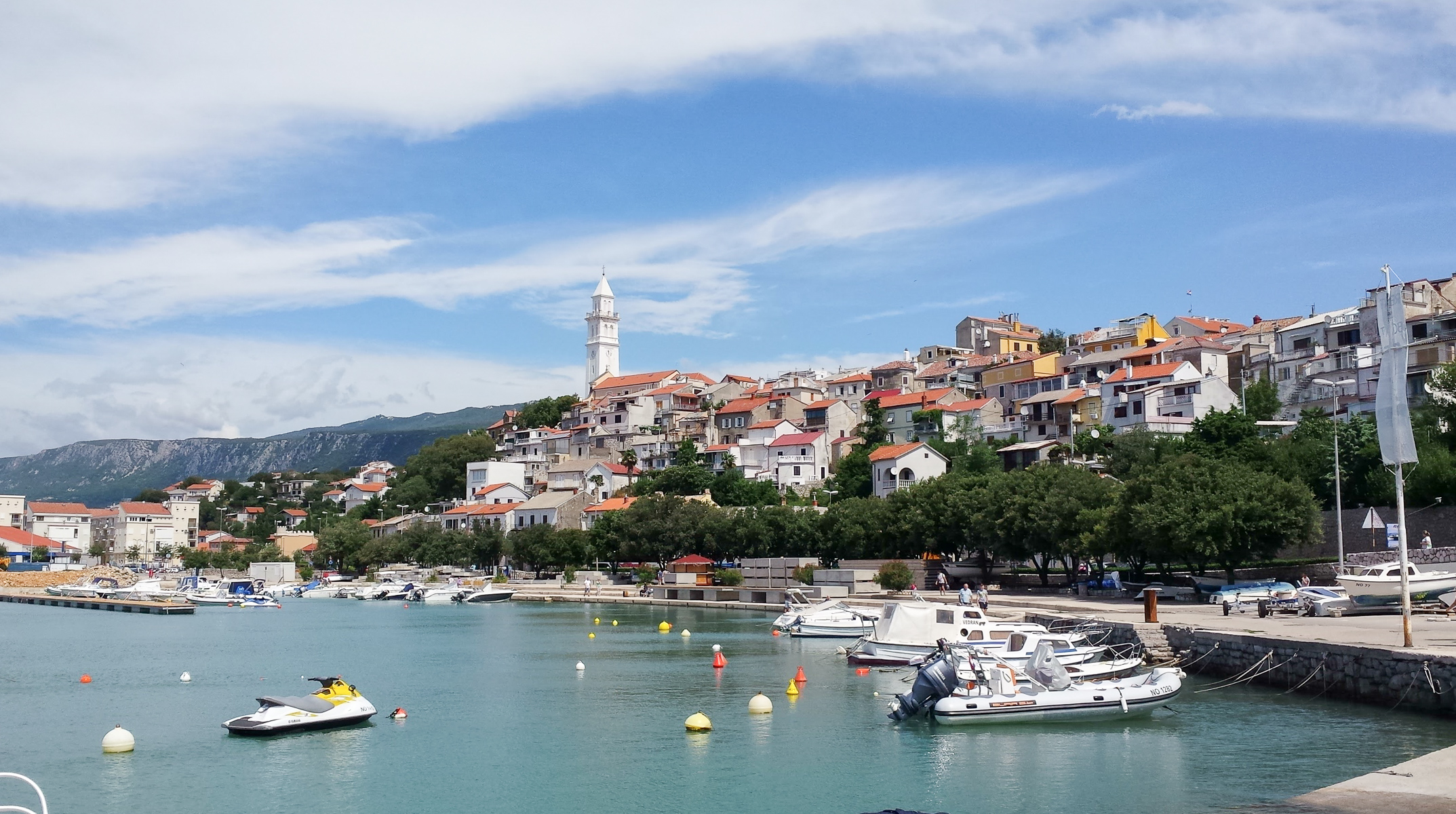
- Novi Vinodolski Old Town

- Coat of arms
- Interactive map of Novi Vinodolski
- Location of Novi Vinodolski within Croatia
- Coordinates: 45°08′N 14°47′E
- Country: Croatia
- Region: Central Croatia (Croatian Littoral)
- County: Primorje-Gorski Kotar County

Government
  - Mayor: Tomislav Cvitković (HDZ)
  - City Council: 15 members: HDZ-HSS (9); _; SDP-PGS-HSU (5); _; HNS (1)

Area
  - Town: 261.4 km^{2} (100.9 sq mi)
  - Urban: 10.2 km^{2} (3.9 sq mi)
- Elevation: 0 m (0 ft)

Population (2021)
  - Town: 4,328
  - Density: 16.56/km^{2} (42.88/sq mi)
  - Urban: 3,336
  - Urban density: 327/km^{2} (847/sq mi)
- Time zone: UTC+1 (CET)
  - Summer (DST): UTC+2 (CEST)
- Postal code: 51 250
- Area code: 051
- Website: novi-vinodolski.hr

Novi Vinodolski (pronounced [nɔ̂v̞iː v̞ǐnɔdɔːlskiː]), often also called Novi, and known in Italian as Novi del Vinodol or Novi in Valdivino, is a town on the Adriatic coast of Croatia, located south of Crikvenica, Selce and Bribir, and north of Senj. In the 2021 census, the settlement of Novi Vinodolski had a population of 3,336, while the administrative area of the town had 4,328 inhabitants.

The area came under the control of the Frankopan family in the 13th century, a period associated with some of its most important cultural heritage, including the Vinodol Statute of 1288. The hinterland is dominated by the Vinodol Valley, which is used for agriculture and viticulture.

Tourism is the principal sector of the local economy as the town is situated in an area largely unaffected by other types of industry and offers a wide variety of tourist amenities. The Vinodol Valley is also associated with the Vinodol Hydroelectric Power Plant, which uses water collected in reservoirs in Gorski Kotar. Transport connections are centred largely on nearby Rijeka, the principal transport hub of the wider region.

== History ==
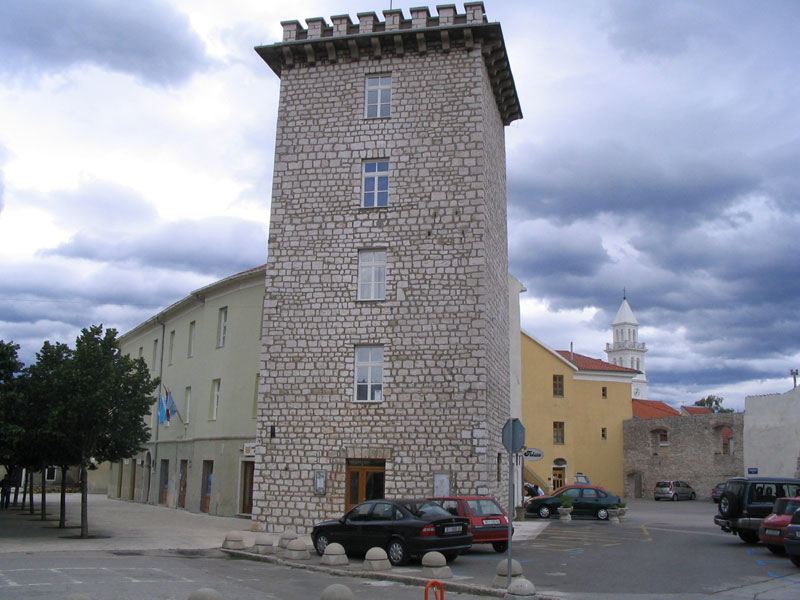
Frankopan Castle

Novi Vinodolski's surrounding area has been inhabited since prehistory, as evidenced by the archaeological site at Osap hill and Roman artefacts and remains such as the Lopsica fortress, found in the city itself and its vicinity. A settlement variously called Novi Grad or Novigrad (lit. New City) was built in the 13th century by the House of Frankopan, which had acquired the area. The medieval development of the region is documented by the Vinodol Statute of 1288 and significant Glagolitic works of the period. Until the 17th century, the town was governed as part of the Principality of Krk or as a Frankopan estate. In the 16th century, Novi Vinodolski became part of the Habsburg monarchy and subsequently shared the political history of the Kingdom of Croatia and its successor states.

Novi Vinodolski is the hometown of writers Ivan and Matija Mažuranić. Ivan Mažuranić was also the first Croatian ban born as a commoner. The town's cultural heritage includes the remains of a Pauline monastery, the Frankopan fortress and castle, a cathedral, Trinity Church, the Church of Saint Marinus on a small eponymous island, the house of the Mažuranić brothers, a library built in 1845, the Homeland Museum and Gallery, the historic town centre, and preserved local folklore.

== Geography and climate ==
Novi Vinodolski is situated in the northern Croatian Littoral, on the Vinodol Riviera of the Adriatic Sea, south of Crikvenica, Selce and Bribir, and north of Senj. According to the 2021 census, the settlement of Novi Vinodolski had a population of 3,336, while the administrative area of the town had 4,328 inhabitants. The historic centre is characterised by coastal Mediterranean architecture, including white façades and red-tiled roofs, and extends inland from the coast towards a church and tower on higher ground. This townscape has contributed to the development of Novi Vinodolski as a tourist centre. The Novi Vinodolski Tourist Office has also associated the town's tourism with its surrounding evergreen and deciduous forests, mild Mediterranean climate, and coastal environment, describing it as one of the principal tourist centres of the region after Opatija. The town's hinterland includes the Vinodol Valley (Vallis vinearia), which extends between Bakarac and Novi Vinodolski.

=== Settlements ===
The administrative area encompasses the following settlements (as of 2021):

- Bater, population 93 ▼
- Bile, population 7 ▲
- Breze, population 14 ▲
- Crno, population 8 ▲
- Donji Zagon, population 114 ▼
- Drinak, population 8
- Gornji Zagon, population 16 ▲
- Jakov Polje, population 12 ▼
- Javorje, population 1 ▼
- Klenovica, population 272 ▼
- Krmpotske Vodice, population 0
- Ledenice, population 164 ▼
- Luka Krmpotska, population 0 ▼
- Novi Vinodolski, population 3,336 ▼
- Podmelnik, population 0
- Povile, population 220 ▼
- Ruševo Krmpotsko, population 2 ▼
- Sibinj Krmpotski, population 32 ▼
- Smokvica Krmpotska, population 29 ▼
- Zabukovac, population 0

== Demographics ==
In 1895, Novi was both a municipality and the administrative centre of the wider Novi district in Modruš-Rijeka County. The town formed part of the Selce electoral district, while judicial and financial administration was based in Ogulin. There were 734 houses, with a population of 3,267. Its 6 villages and 2 hamlets were encompassed for taxation purposes by a single porezna obćina, under the Bakar office. In the 626 square kilometres (242 mi^{2}) Novi kotar, there were a total of 4969 houses, with a population of 26,684. Its 132 villages and 91 hamlets were divided into 12 porezne obćine. The kotar had two statistical markets: one in Novi and one in Crikvenica. Novi kotar was divided into 8 općine. Besides itself: Bribir, Crikvenica, Drežnica, Drivenik, Grižane Belgrad, Krmpote and Selce.

Town of Novi Vinodolski: Population trends 1857–2021
v

population	5959	7264	6708	6762	6819	6795	6445	5835	4570	5048	4732	4340	4547	4978	5282	5113	4328
	1857	1869	1880	1890	1900	1910	1921	1931	1948	1953	1961	1971	1981	1991	2001	2011	2021

Sources: Croatian Bureau of Statistics publications

== Economy and infrastructure ==
The economy of Novi Vinodolski is dominated by tourism and related activities. Hotels, holiday accommodation, campsites, bungalows, apartments and rooms in privately owned houses can accommodate more than 10,000 tourists at a time. The city and its surroundings provide recreational, sporting, and spa facilities. The town's harbour contains berths, a filling station, and other facilities required for yachting.

The surrounding Vinodol Valley is used for agriculture, particularly viticulture and winemaking. Wines produced in the area are similar to those produced on the nearby island of Krk, with Žlahtina the predominant variety; Cabernet Sauvignon and Chardonnay are also produced. Wine production received renewed impetus in the 1990s, when refugees from Vukovar established the Pavlomir winery during the Croatian War of Independence. A wine produced in the region was selected as an official wine during the visit of Pope Benedict XVI to Croatia.

The town is connected by the Adriatic Highway, a 40-kilometre (25 mi) segment of the D8 state road linking it with the Croatian motorway network east of Rijeka. Rijeka is the principal transport hub of the region, providing railway connections to Zagreb, Ljubljana and destinations elsewhere in Europe, as well as access to Rijeka Airport and the Port of Rijeka.

Hrvatska elektroprivreda operates the Vinodol Hydroelectric Power Plant, which uses several reservoirs in Gorski Kotar, including Lake Bajer, to generate electricity. The arrangement of the reservoirs and power plant provides a hydraulic head exceeding 650 metres (2,130 feet). The plant has a rated capacity of 90 MW and an average annual production of 139 GWh.

== Governance ==
=== Local ===
The town is divided into two local committees: East, encompassing the eastern part of the town, and West, encompassing the western part of the town and Gornji Zagon.

== Culture ==
Since 1993, the Croatian Heritage Foundation has organised the Little School of Croatian Language and Culture each July. By 2023, the programme had attracted more than 1,700 participants from 41 countries.

== Notable people ==
- Ivan Mažuranić
- Matija Mažuranić
- Branka Petrić

== Bibliography ==
=== General ===
- Leksikografski zavod Miroslav Krleža (2013–2024). "Novi Vinodolski". Hrvatska enciklopedija (online ed.). Archived from the original on 2023-12-26.

=== Biology ===
- Šašić, Martina; Nahirnić, Ana; Tarmann, Gerhard M. (2016-12-31). "Zygaenidae (Lepidoptera) in the Lepidoptera collections of the Croatian Natural History Museum". Natura Croatica: Periodicum Musei Historiae Naturalis Croatici. 25 (2): 233–248. doi:10.20302/NC.2016.25.19. eISSN 1848-7386.

=== History ===
- Laszowski, Emilij (1923). "Novi". Gorski kotar i Vinodol: Dio državine knezova Frankopana i Zrinskih (Mjestopisne i povjesne crtice) (PDF). Zagreb: Matica hrvatska, 🖶 Tiskara "Narodnih novina" (published 1924-01-12). pp. 229–249. Archived from the original (PDF) on 2023-08-12. Online publication 2016-01-09.
  - Also: Laszowski, Emilij (1923). "Paulinski samostan na Ospu kod Novoga". Gorski kotar i Vinodol: Dio državine knezova Frankopana i Zrinskih (Mjestopisne i povjesne crtice) (PDF). Zagreb: Matica hrvatska, 🖶 Tiskara "Narodnih novina" (published 1924-01-12). pp. 252–259. Archived from the original (PDF) on 2023-08-12.
