= Vinodol =

Vinodol is a Slavic toponym that may refer to:

- Vinodol, Nitra, village and municipality in Slovakia
- Vinodol, Croatia, municipality and valley in Croatia
  - Vinodol Channel, channel in Croatia
  - Vinodol Hydroelectric Power Plant, power plant in Croatia
