= Crno =

Crno may refer to:

- Crno, Primorje-Gorski Kotar County, a village near Novi Vinodolski, Croatia
- Crno, Zadar County, a village near Zadar, Croatia
- Lake Crno, a lake near Žabljak, Montenegro
- Črno jezero, a lake near Triglav, Slovenia
