= Velika Kapela =

Mountain range in Croatia

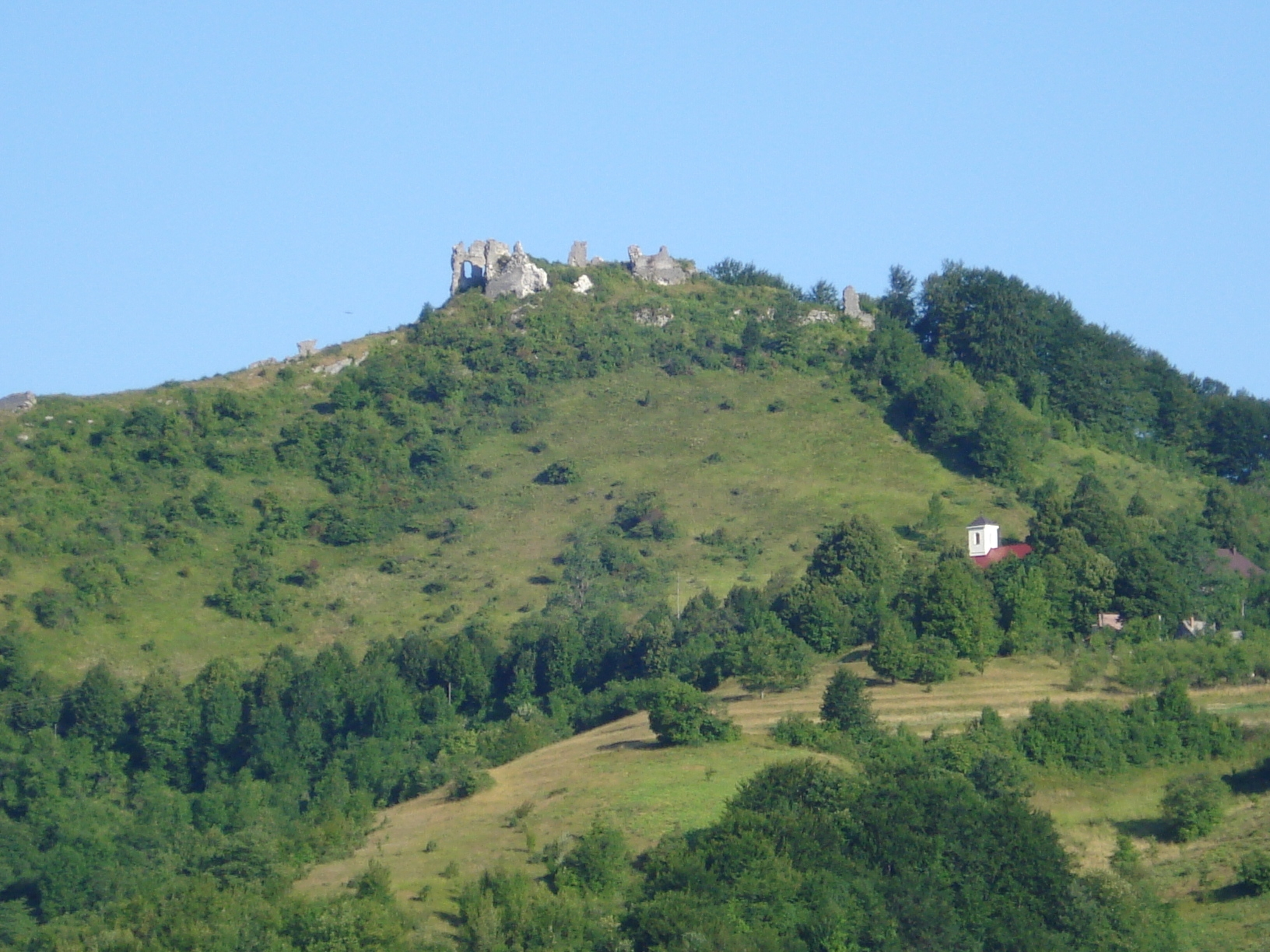
- Eastern slopes of the Velika Kapela with ruins of the Tržan Castle in Modruš

Highest point
- Elevation: 1,526 m (5,007 ft)
- Listing: Mountains of Croatia
- Coordinates: 45°16′20″N 14°57′45″E

Geography
- Location within Croatia
- Location: Gorski kotar, Croatia
- Parent range: Dinaric Alps

The Velika Kapela (pronounced [ʋɛ̂likaː kǎpɛla]; lit. Great Chapel) is a large mountain range in the east of Gorski Kotar, Croatia.

The highest peak is Bjelolasica-Kula at 1533 m.a.s.l. It overlooks Velebit, Plješivica, islands Krk, Cres, Lošinj, and the Kvarner Gulf.

Velika Kapela belongs to the Dinaric Alps, and it stretches from the Gorski Kotar region in the west, to the Mala Kapela and Lika in the east, from the Ogulin-Plaški valley in the north, and to the Vinodol coastline in the south. The area is narrowest mountain prague between continental Pannonia and the coastal Mediterranean. Velika Kapela is mainly composed of karst — limestone rocks.

On the Velika Kapela, there are many protected areas and landscapes. The famous are White cliffs and Samarske cliffs (Croatian: Bijele i Samarske stijene), and Klek above Frankopan town of Ogulin.

== Infrastructure ==
An old road used to run from Vitunj over Lumbarda mountain through Bjelsko (by Potok Musulinski) and Gvozd to Drežnica, and from there to Ledenica and Bribir.
