= Krivi Put =

Coordinates: 45°02′N 14°58′E

- Village
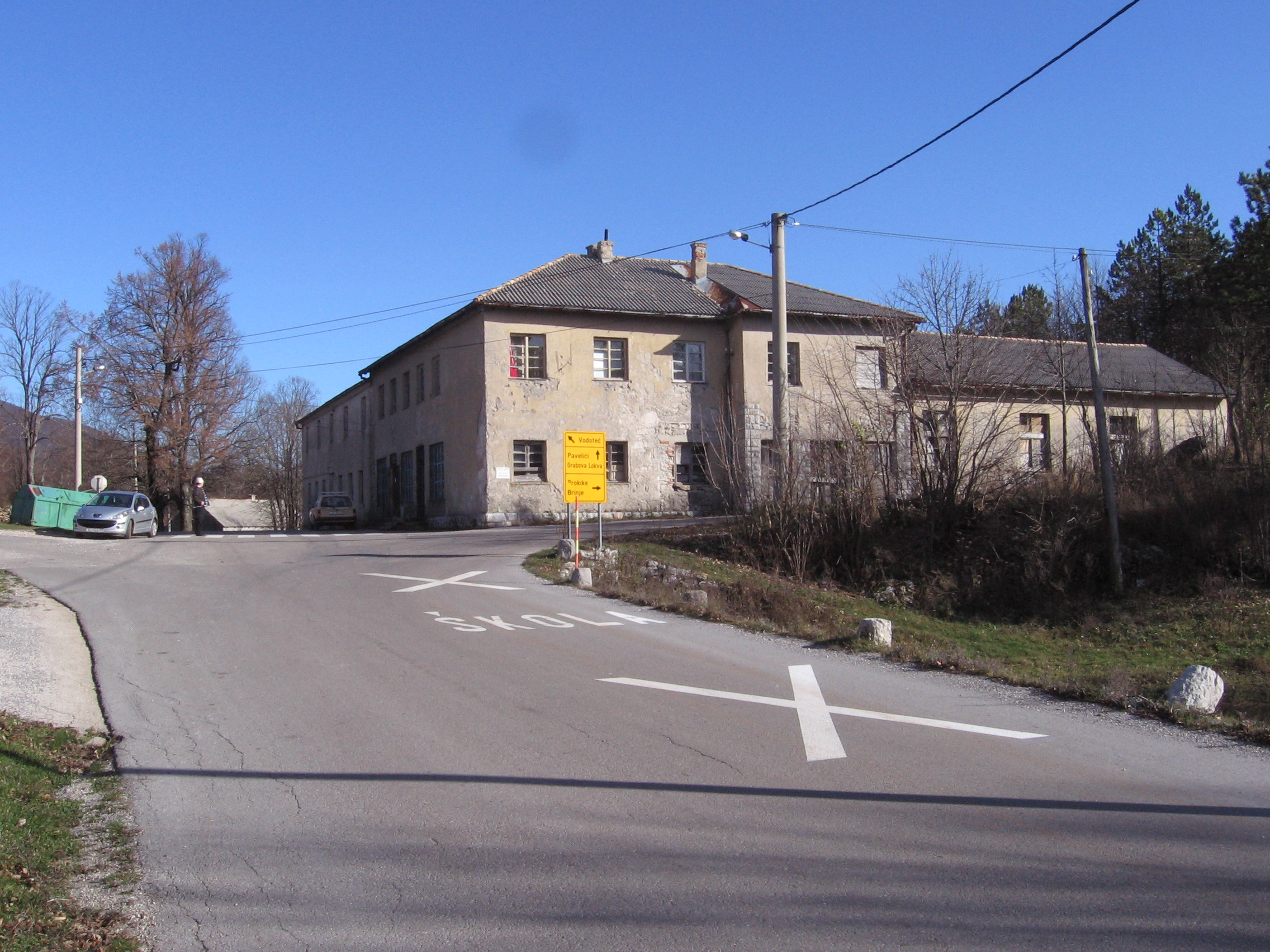
- Interactive map of Krivi Put
- Country: Croatia
- County: Lika-Senj County
- Town: Senj

Area
  - Total: 3.6 sq mi (9.3 km^{2})

Population (2021)
  - Total: 39
  - Density: 11/sq mi (4.2/km^{2})
- Time zone: UTC+1 (CET)
  - Summer (DST): UTC+2 (CEST)
- Postal code: 53270 Senj
- Area code: 053
- Vehicle registration: GS

Krivi Put is a village located in a forested area near Senj, in Lika-Senj County, Croatia.

Its earliest settlers founded the village in 1605, favouring it as good grazing land for their cattle. The nearby villages of Veljun, Serdari, Alan, Krmpote and Podbilo were also founded by Bunjevci settlers around the same time. The village celebrates an annual holiday on August 5.

== Name ==
Although krivi put means wrong way in modern Croatian, the older and more correct translation is curvy or bendy road, which reflects its location since roads leading up to the village are steep and curvy because of the mountainous terrain.

== Demographics ==
In the 2021 census, the village had a population of 39, most of whom are Croats. Today, the majority of Krivi Put's population are farmers.

In 1835, Krivi Put was the seat of a captain's post, and belonged to Krmpote. There were 98 houses, with a population of 1246.

== Notable people ==
Former inhabitants include:

- Rudy Perpich, former governor of Minnesota.
- The parents of Ante Pavelić, Fascist leader of the Axis powers allied Independent State of Croatia.
- The antecedents of former NBA player and coach Rudy Tomjanovich.
