= Bile, Croatia =

Settlement in Primorje-Gorski Kotar County, Croatia

Bile
- Settlement
- Interactive map of Bile
- Location of Bile in Croatia
- Coordinates: 45°04′25″N 14°53′26″E
- Country: Croatia
- County: Primorje-Gorski Kotar
- City: Novi Vinodolski

Area
  - Total: 4.4 km^{2} (1.7 sq mi)

Population (2021)
  - Total: 7
  - Density: 1.6/km^{2} (4.1/sq mi)
- Time zone: UTC+1 (CET)
  - Summer (DST): UTC+2 (CEST)
- Postal code: 51250 Novi Vinodolski

Bile is a settlement in the City of Novi Vinodolski in Croatia. In 2021, its population was 7.

== Demographics ==
Bile: Population trends 1857–2021
v

| population | 212 | | | 184 | 168 | 199 | 196 | 177 | 131 | 138 | 81 | 52 | 18 | 13 | 8 | 5 | 7 |
| | 1857 | 1869 | 1880 | 1890 | 1900 | 1910 | 1921 | 1931 | 1948 | 1953 | 1961 | 1971 | 1981 | 1991 | 2001 | 2011 | 2021 |

Sources: Croatian Bureau of Statistics publications
