= Potok Musulinski =

Village in Karlovac County, Croatia

Potok Musulinski Musulinski Potok
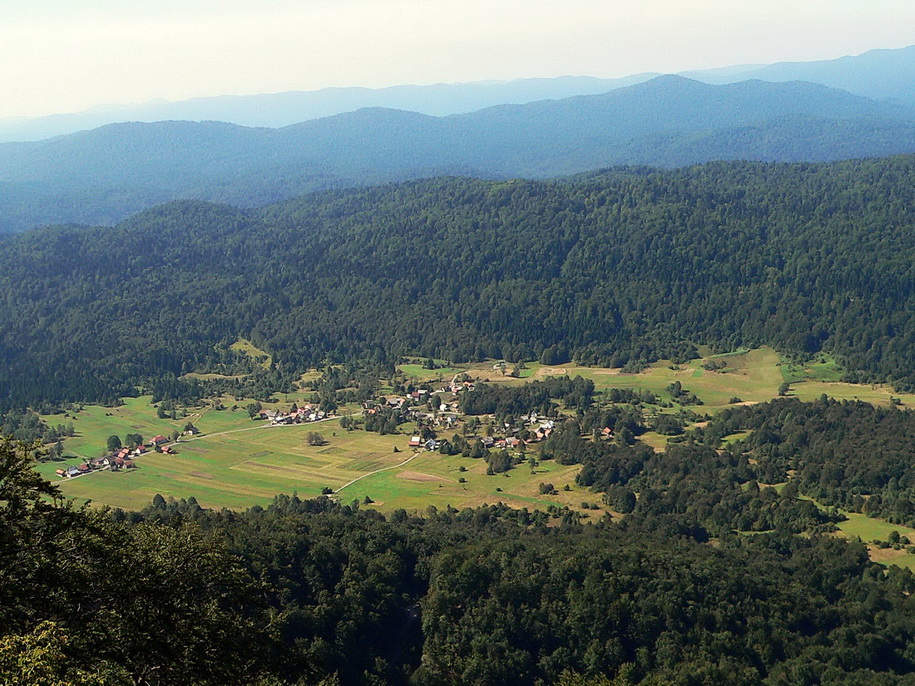
- Viewed from Klek

- Location within Croatia
- Coordinates: 45°14′49″N 15°07′48″E
- Country: Croatia
- County: Karlovac
- City: Ogulin

Area
  - Total: 64.8 km^{2} (25.0 sq mi)

Population (2021)
  - Total: 84
  - Density: 1.3/km^{2} (3.4/sq mi)
- Time zone: UTC+1 (CET)
  - Summer (DST): UTC+2 (CEST)
- Postal code: 47300 Ogulin
- Area code: +385 (0)47

Potok Musulinski or Musulinski Potok is a village in Karlovac County, Croatia. It is located in the municipality of Ogulin.

== History ==
From 28 May through 1 June 1941, about 70 figures from Ogulin and the surrounding area were arrested and imprisoned in the Ogulin castle. Most at the market there or returning from it. This was in connection with a visit of Lovre Sušić to Ogulin, ostensibly for his security. Simo Milanović of Musulinski Potok was transporting logs that day from Ponorac by Jasenak. The Ustaša who saw him was a friend of his, so he gave him a certificate that allowed him to pass all the guards and return to his village, although he had to leave the horses behind. After that experience, Milanović left for the forest. Few survived this arrest.

On 1 July 1942, the Chetniks of Gomirje and Musulini accompanied the Italian army on an anti-Partisan campaign in Musulinski Potok. 2 Chetniks were wounded and a number of Partisans were killed and wounded. The Chetniks captured a machine gun and 20 military rifles. Then on the 6th, the Partisans carried out an attack on Gomirje and Musulini, which the Chetniks repelled.

== Demographics ==
Village of Potok Musulinski: Population trends 1857–2021
v

| population | | | 245 | 564 | 657 | 669 | 708 | 870 | 495 | 484 | 462 | 232 | 176 | 145 | 126 | 91 | 84 |
| | 1857 | 1869 | 1880 | 1890 | 1900 | 1910 | 1921 | 1931 | 1948 | 1953 | 1961 | 1971 | 1981 | 1991 | 2001 | 2011 | 2021 |

Note:Under Ogulin and Drežnica in 1857 and 1869, and partly under Drežnica in 1880. Brezno Drežničko, which had ceased to exist, was added to it in 2001. From 1890 it includes Brezno Drežničko. Sources: Croatian Bureau of Statistics publications

== Infrastructure ==
An old road used to run from Vitunj over Lumbarda mountain through Bjelsko (by Potok Musulinski) and Gvozd to Drežnica, and from there to Ledenica and Bribir.

== Bibliography ==
- Trgo, Fabijan, ed. (1964). Zbornik dokumenata i podataka o Narodno-oslobodilačkom ratu Jugoslovenskih naroda. Vol. V, 32.
