= Jakov Polje =

Settlement in Primorje-Gorski Kotar County, Croatia

- Settlement
- Interactive map of Jakov Polje
- Location of Jakov Polje in Croatia
- Coordinates: 45°05′04″N 14°52′18″E
- Country: Croatia
- County: Primorje-Gorski Kotar
- City: Novi Vinodolski

Area
  - Total: 1.8 km^{2} (0.69 sq mi)

Population (2021)
  - Total: 12
  - Density: 6.7/km^{2} (17/sq mi)
- Time zone: UTC+1 (CET)
  - Summer (DST): UTC+2 (CEST)
- Postal code: 51250 Novi Vinodolski

Jakov Polje is a settlement in the City of Novi Vinodolski in Croatia. In 2021, its population was 12.

== Demographics ==
Jakov Polje: Population trends 1857–2021
v

population	387	1922	402	248	238	255	225	190	147	132	90	66	48	30	25	17	12
	1857	1869	1880	1890	1900	1910	1921	1931	1948	1953	1961	1971	1981	1991	2001	2011	2021

Sources: Croatian Bureau of Statistics publications
