= Klenovica =

- Village
- Location within Croatia
- Coordinates: 45°06′N 14°51′E
- Country: Croatia
- County: Primorje-Gorski Kotar County
- Municipality: Novi Vinodolski

Area
  - Total: 4.3 km^{2} (1.7 sq mi)

Population (2021)
  - Total: 272
  - Density: 63/km^{2} (160/sq mi)
- Time zone: UTC+1 (CET)
  - Summer (DST): UTC+2 (CEST)

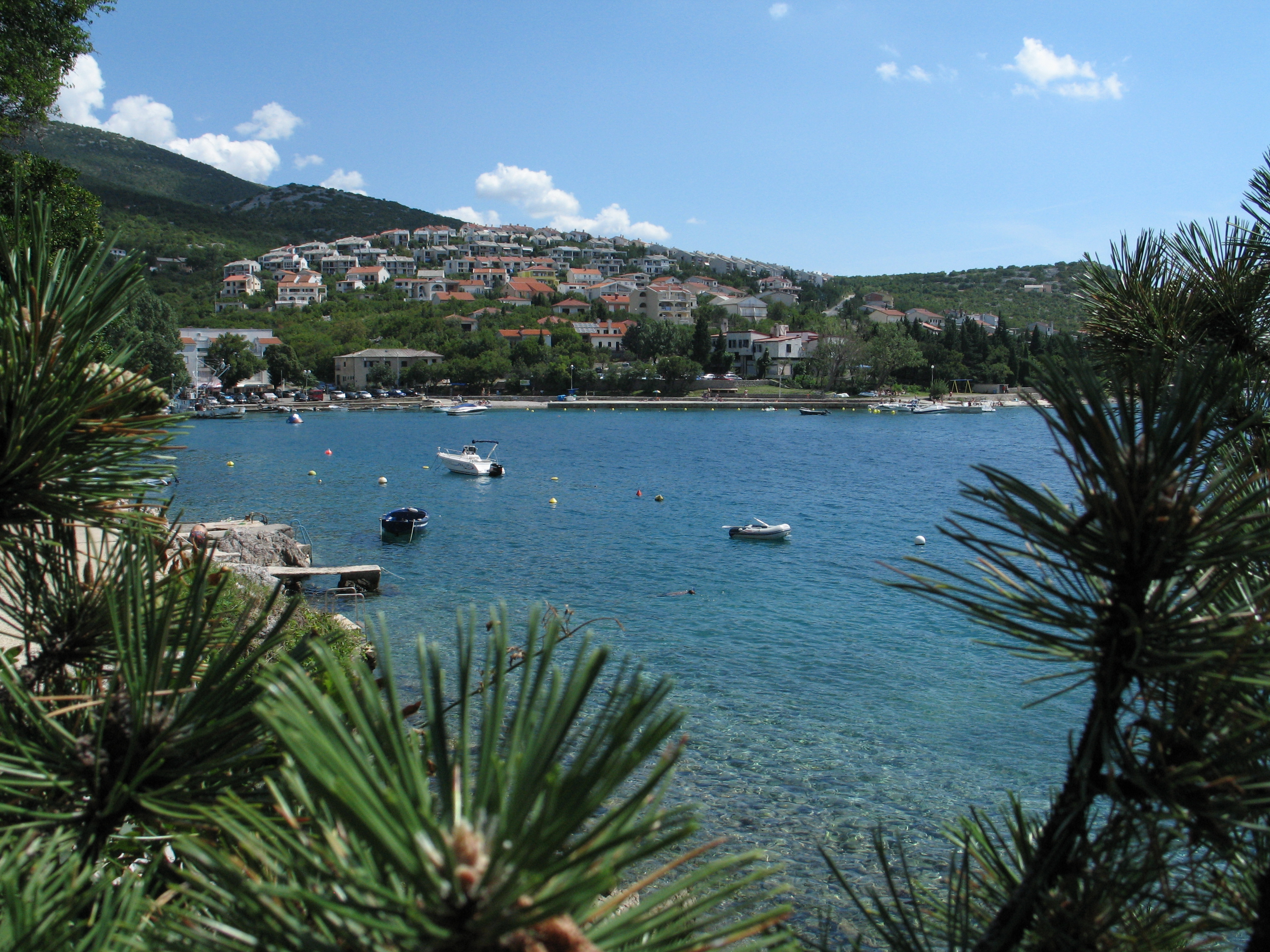
Klenovica

Klenovica is a small fishing village in Croatia located between Senj and Novi Vinodolski. It is connected by the D8 highway. Klenovica includes the hamlets of Cvitkovići, Kalanji, Miletići, Kula-Komadine and Žrnovnica. Klenovica was mentioned for the first time in 1388 in the Statute of Senj.

The village has been there since the 17th century when it was known by the name of "Krmpocana" (part of Krmpote). The small fishing village is located (as the crow flies) 6km. south-east of Novi Vinodolski (10 km by road).

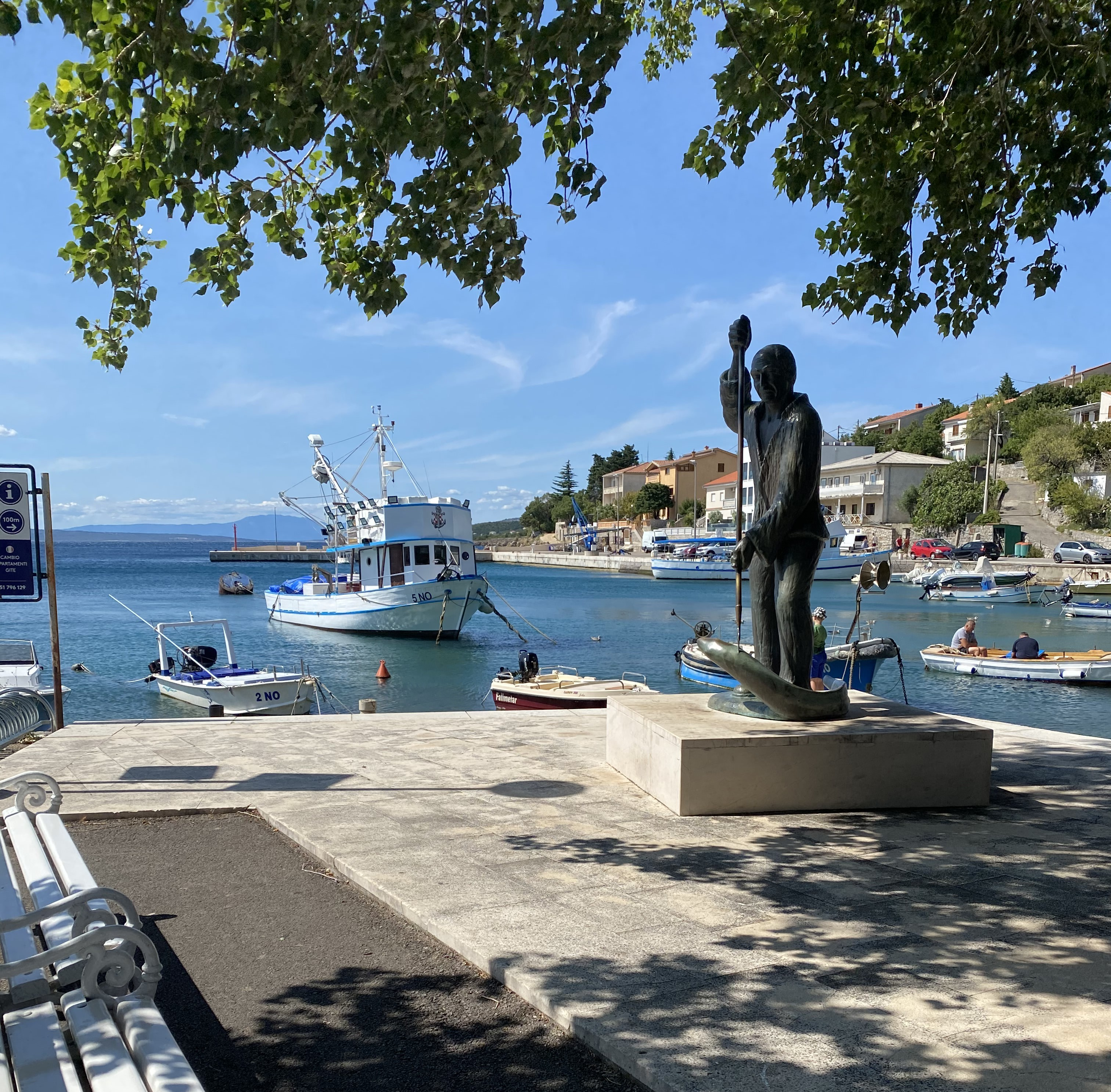
Statue of fisherman in Klenovica

Klenovica has about 400 residents, including many famous fishermen. Some old wooden fishing boats can still be found in the small harbor, some of them are still being used. The number of people in Klenovica becomes much higher during the season when tourists arrive from all over the world.

There are 6 restaurants, a pizzeria, 4 bars, 3 shops, a bakery, a petrol station, a post office and a camp in Klenovica.

Klenovica offers a hotel called "Villa Lostura", a number of private accommodations, about 500 beds, camping for about 2000 guests and of course, several restaurants with a wide choice fish and seafood. The gastronomic offer is a combination of coastal and Velebit tradition.

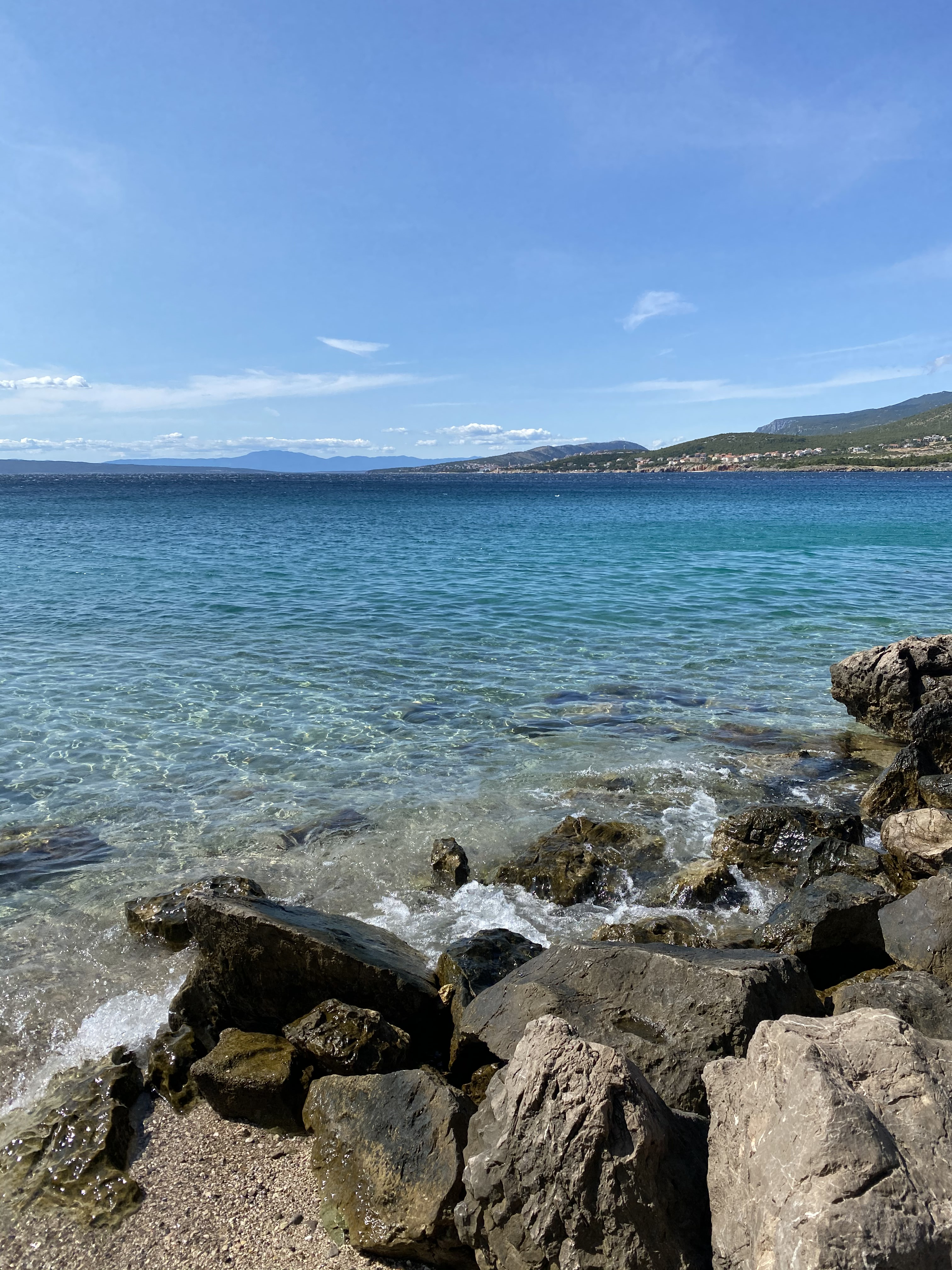
Sea view - Klenovica

The most specific thing about Klenovica are the sources of fresh water in the sea. Mixing of fresh and salt water favours the development of flora and fauna, therefore, in this area there is plenty of fish. The rough hinterland with a variety of woods and gray rock formations, as well as the natural coastline with cliffs and beaches are the precursors of Kapela and Velebit mountain (up to 1146m).

West of Klenovica is "Zrnovnica", a bay with a large freshwater source for the village Klenovica as well as Novi Vinodolski delivering drinking water.

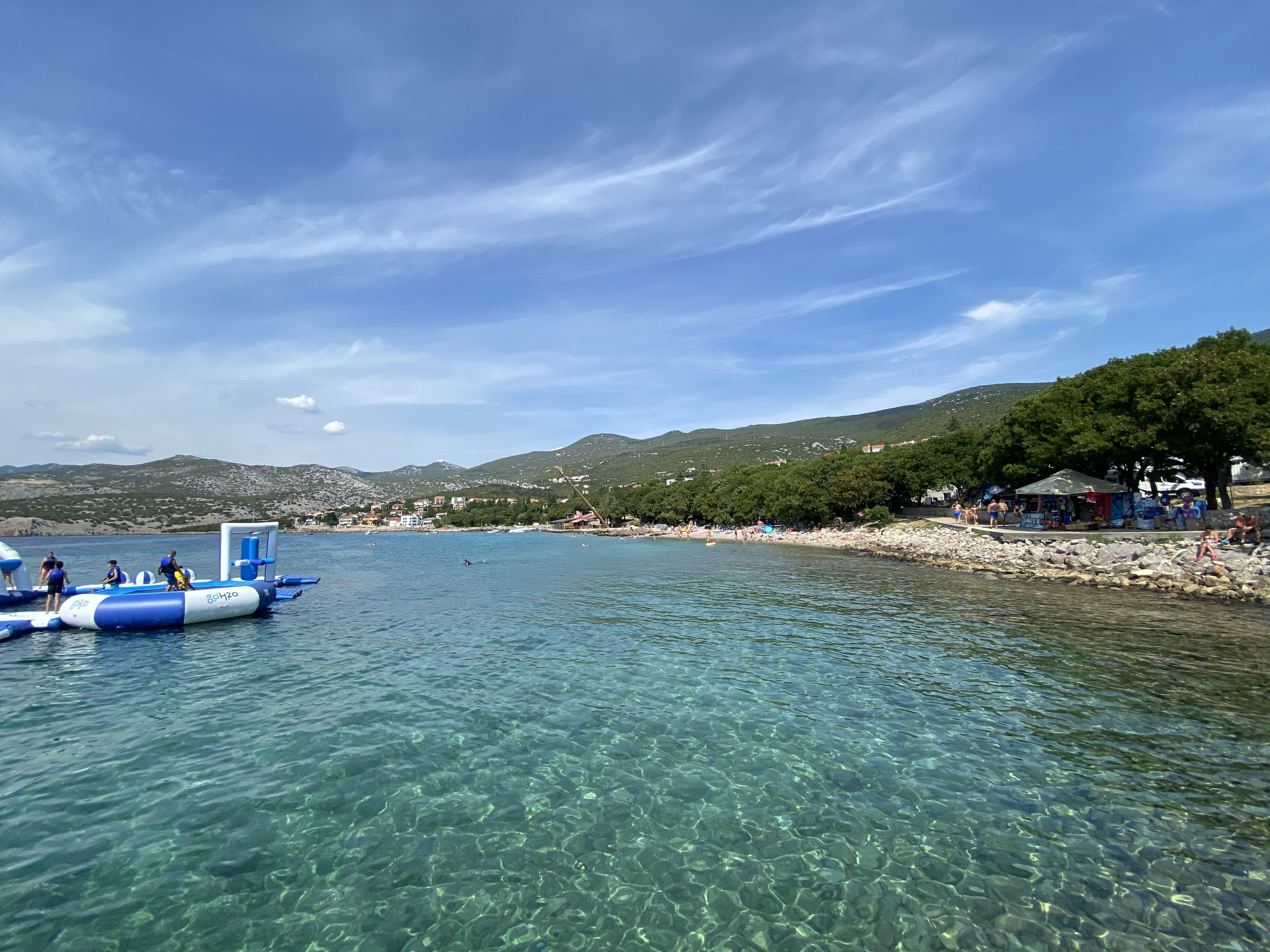
Summer in Klenovica

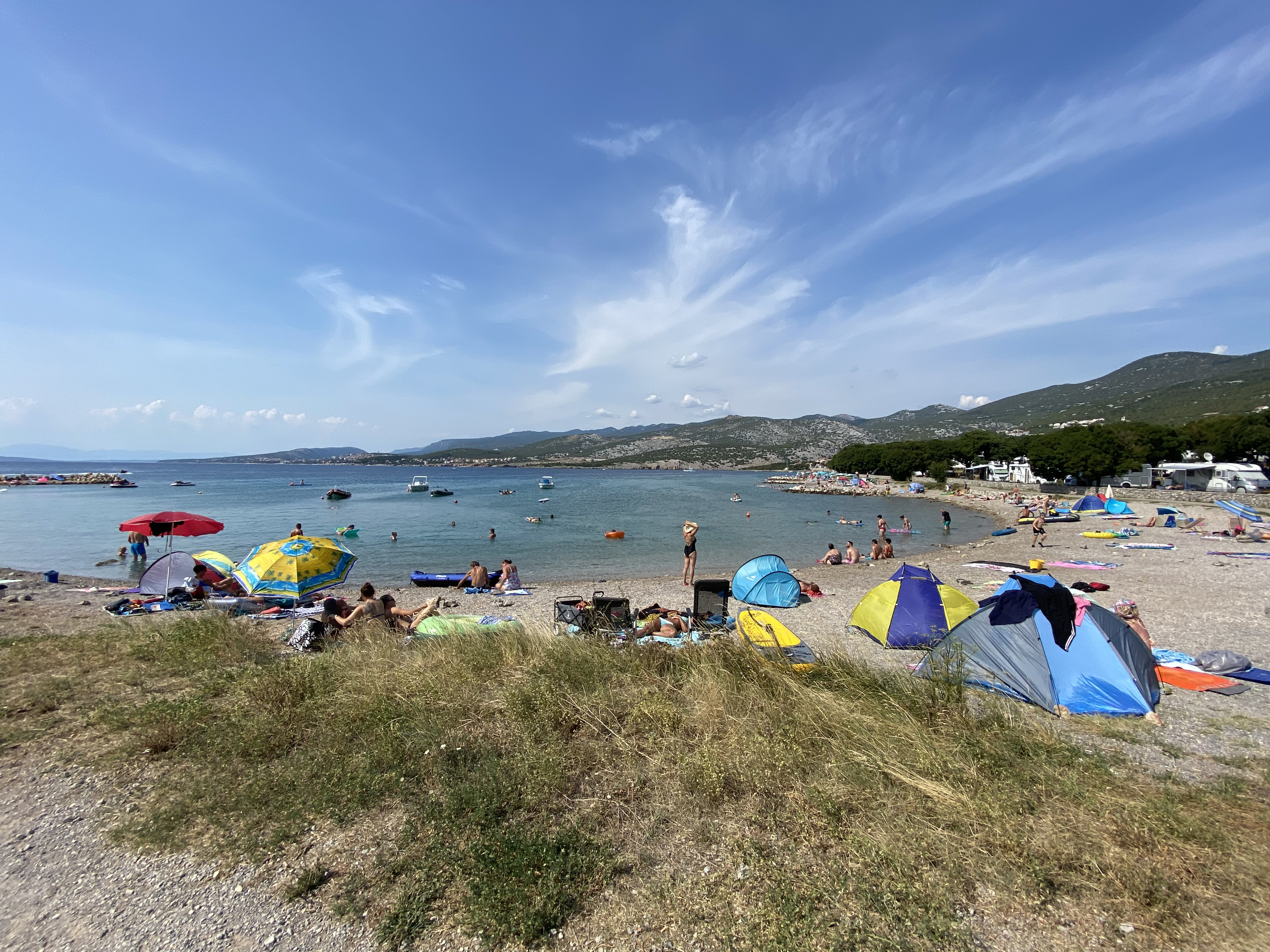
Klenovica - beach in the summertime
