= Ruševo Krmpotsko =

Settlement in Primorje-Gorski Kotar County, Croatia

- Settlement
- Interactive map of Ruševo Krmpotsko
- Location of Ruševo Krmpotsko in Croatia
- Coordinates: 45°05′04″N 14°54′38″E
- Country: Croatia
- County: Primorje-Gorski Kotar
- City: Novi Vinodolski

Area
  - Total: 3.4 km^{2} (1.3 sq mi)

Population (2021)
  - Total: 2
  - Density: 0.59/km^{2} (1.5/sq mi)
- Time zone: UTC+1 (CET)
  - Summer (DST): UTC+2 (CEST)
- Postal code: 51250 Novi Vinodolski

Ruševo Krmpotsko is a settlement in the City of Novi Vinodolski in Croatia. In 2021, its population was 2.

== Demographics ==
Ruševo Krmpotsko: Population trends 1857–2021
v

population	180		203	202	155	220	206	173	147	122	94	29	11	3	5	4	2
	1857	1869	1880	1890	1900	1910	1921	1931	1948	1953	1961	1971	1981	1991	2001	2011	2021

Sources: Croatian Bureau of Statistics publications
