= Krmpote =

Coordinates: 45°05′N 14°52′E

Krmpote is a group of villages in Croatia located around Novi Vinodolski in Croatian Littoral, and to the area belong villages Bile, Drinak, Jakovo Polje (Sv. Jakov), Javorje, Klenovica–Žrnovnica, Krmpotske Vodice, Luka Krmpotska, Podmelnik, Povile, Ruševo Krmpotsko, Sibinj Krmpotski, Smokvica Krmpotska, and Zabukovac.

== Etymology ==
The toponym is related to local population of Bunjevci and etymologically deriving from their tribe named Krmpoćani (Carimpoti; Krnpote and Krmpote) who arrived from temporary village area of Krmpota (Carampotti) near Zemunik (today between Medviđe and Zelengrad), in North Dalmatia (Bukovica) in the beginning of the 17th century. From it derives the related surname Krmpotić, as well same-titled noble family Kermpotich who lived in Buhovo in West Herzegovina from where emigrated to North Dalmatia in the mid-15th century because of Ottoman invasion. In Herzegovina the surname became extinct, and there's uncertainty as to which families directly descend from them, besides Zdunić, Sabljić, Cvitanovć/Cvitković among many others.

Croatian linguist Petar Šimunović considered it a Vlach oeconym, and linguist Valentin Putanec etymologically derived it from Latin root camp(us) (> *Compates) "those who live in the field" with rotation kamp > crmp (as in Romanian căpusa > krpuša) with ethnic suffix -ota, as in Vlahota (Vlach), Krmpota (Krmpoćanin), Likota (Ličanin).

== History ==
On 16 June 1605, Demijan Krmpočanin, vođa of the Vlachs of Krmpote, swore allegiance to the Zrinski family, together with Tomaš Skorupović, Tomaš Marković, Marko Balinović and Mile Budorčić, on behalf of all.

== Demographics ==
In 1835, Krmpote was the seat of a company. There were 367 houses, with a population of 4582, of which 3895 Catholic and 687 Eastern Orthodox. These lived in 7 villages. Apart from Krmpote itself, these were: Krivi Put, Mrzli Dol, Tušević, Vojvoduša, Ledenice and Podbilo. The Catholics had 3 parishes, but the Orthodox did not have one.

In 1895, the obćina of Krmpote (court at Ledenice), with an area of 205 square kilometres (79 mi^{2}), belonged to the kotar of Novi (Novi court but Selce electoral district) in the Modruš-Rieka županija (Ogulin court and financial board). There were 596 houses, with a population of 3495. Its 25 villages and 21 hamlets were divided for taxation purposes into 2 porezne obćine, under the Bakar office.

== Geography ==
Krmpote is known for its beautiful landscape, the Kuk and Sviba viewpoints, the decorated Heavenly Labyrinths and the glass chapel in the village of Omar.
