= Turkovići Ogulinski =

- Location within Croatia
- Coordinates: 45°17′N 15°10′E
- Country: Croatia
- County: Karlovac
- City: Ogulin

Area
  - Total: 4.0 km^{2} (1.5 sq mi)

Population (2021)
  - Total: 202
  - Density: 50/km^{2} (130/sq mi)
- Time zone: UTC+1 (CET)
  - Summer (DST): UTC+2 (CEST)

Turkovići Ogulinski is a village in Karlovac, Croatia, and a suburb of Ogulin.

The village sits on the foothills of Klek, near the Vitunjčica River.

Turkovići Ogulinski was previously incorporated with the Frankopan City of Vitunj, however, the city was abandoned in 1575. In 1847, the first waterway for Ogulin was built in Turkovići.

== Demographics ==
According to the Census of 2001, the village had a population of 255 residents, along with 82 family households.

== Economy ==
- In the time of the Banovina of Croatia, the fish farm "Podklek" in Turkovići held the status of Banate fish farm (Croatian: bansko ribogojilište).

== Bibliography ==
- Banska vlast Banovine Hrvatske (1940e). "Srezovi". Godišnjak banske vlasti Banovine Hrvatske (in Croatian). Vol. 1. pp. 330–337.
