= Mrzli Dol =

Settlement in Lika-Senj County, Croatia

- Settlement
- Interactive map of Mrzli Dol
- Location of Mrzli Dol in Croatia
- Coordinates: 45°01′58″N 14°59′17″E
- Country: Croatia
- County: Lika-Senj
- City: Senj

Area
  - Total: 13.5 km^{2} (5.2 sq mi)

Population (2021)
  - Total: 23
  - Density: 1.7/km^{2} (4.4/sq mi)
- Time zone: UTC+1 (CET)
  - Summer (DST): UTC+2 (CEST)
- Postal code: 53270 Senj
- Area code: +385 (0)53

Mrzli Dol is a settlement in the City of Senj in Croatia. In 2021, its population was 23.

== Demographics ==
Mrzli Dol: Population trends 1857–2021
v

| population | 442 | 550 | 509 | 414 | 416 | 468 | 366 | 354 | 349 | 308 | 215 | 110 | 56 | 27 | 27 | 28 | 23 |
| | 1857 | 1869 | 1880 | 1890 | 1900 | 1910 | 1921 | 1931 | 1948 | 1953 | 1961 | 1971 | 1981 | 1991 | 2001 | 2011 | 2021 |

Sources: Croatian Bureau of Statistics publications

In 1835, Mrzli Dol belonged to Krmpote. It had 16 houses, with a population of 328. Its residents were Catholic.
