= Sibinj Krmpotski =

Coordinates: 45°03′N 14°53′E

- Village
- Interactive map of Sibinj Krmpotski
- Country: Croatia
- County: Primorje-Gorski Kotar County
- Municipality: Novi Vinodolski

Area
  - Total: 6.4 km^{2} (2.5 sq mi)

Population (2021)
  - Total: 32
  - Density: 5.0/km^{2} (13/sq mi)
- Time zone: UTC+1 (CET)
  - Summer (DST): UTC+2 (CEST)

Sibinj Krmpotski is a village in Croatia. It is connected by the D8 highway and is part of the group of villages called Krmpote.
