= Drinak =

Settlement in Primorje-Gorski Kotar County, Croatia

- Settlement
- Interactive map of Drinak
- Location of Drinak in Croatia
- Coordinates: 45°05′43″N 14°52′24″E
- Country: Croatia
- County: Primorje-Gorski Kotar
- City: Novi Vinodolski

Area
  - Total: 3.2 km^{2} (1.2 sq mi)

Population (2021)
  - Total: 8
  - Density: 2.5/km^{2} (6.5/sq mi)
- Time zone: UTC+1 (CET)
  - Summer (DST): UTC+2 (CEST)
- Postal code: 51250 Novi Vinodolski

Drinak is a settlement in the City of Novi Vinodolski in Croatia. In 2021, its population was 8.

== Demographics ==
Drinak: Population trends 1857–2021
v

population	138		156	142	126	142	173	153	91	92	76	46	15	7	10	8	8
	1857	1869	1880	1890	1900	1910	1921	1931	1948	1953	1961	1971	1981	1991	2001	2011	2021

Sources: Croatian Bureau of Statistics publications
