= Javorje, Primorje-Gorski Kotar County =

Settlement in Primorje-Gorski Kotar County, Croatia

Javorje
- Settlement
- Interactive map of Javorje
- Location of Javorje in Croatia
- Coordinates: 45°05′57″N 14°54′46″E
- Country: Croatia
- County: Primorje-Gorski Kotar
- City: Novi Vinodolski

Area
  - Total: 4.2 km^{2} (1.6 sq mi)

Population (2021)
  - Total: 1
  - Density: 0.24/km^{2} (0.62/sq mi)
- Time zone: UTC+1 (CET)
  - Summer (DST): UTC+2 (CEST)
- Postal code: 51250 Novi Vinodolski

Javorje is a settlement in the City of Novi Vinodolski in Croatia. In 2021, its population was 1.

== Demographics ==
Javorje: Population trends 1857–2021
v

| population | 81 | | 88 | 100 | 95 | 112 | 73 | 85 | 112 | 88 | 55 | 23 | 4 | 4 | 3 | 2 | 1 |
| | 1857 | 1869 | 1880 | 1890 | 1900 | 1910 | 1921 | 1931 | 1948 | 1953 | 1961 | 1971 | 1981 | 1991 | 2001 | 2011 | 2021 |

Sources: Croatian Bureau of Statistics publications
