= Vitunjčica =

- Location within Croatia

Location
- Countries: Croatia

Physical characteristics
- Source
  - location: Vitunj
  - coordinates: 45.2914°N 15.1404°E
  - elevation: 347.8 m (1,141 ft)
- Mouth
  - location: Turkovići Ogulinski
  - coordinates: 45.2810°N 15.1752°E
- Length: 4.13 km (2.57 mi)
- Basin size: 18 square kilometres (6.9 mi^{2})

Basin features
- Progression: Dobra→ Kupa→ Sava→ Danube→ Black Sea

Vitunjčica is a right tributary of the Gornja Dobra that runs through the karst polje of Vitunj, flowing into the Ogulin-Plaški valley.

== Name ==
Derived from the oikonym Vitunj.

== Hydrology ==
Since at least 1981, the water level of the Vitunjčica has been recorded at the Brestovica station. Its mean maximum discharge exceeds 400 l/s.

At high flow, the water level at the springs is up to 1 metre (3.3 ft) higher in elevation.

== Geology ==
Its source is in the contact zone between Limestone and Dolomite of the Lower Cretaceous, in a basin of mostly Lower Cretaceous and Malmic Dolomite, but the constant flow indicates a significant subterranean length.

The source itself is a double fracture spring, each individual crack sloped downward. There spring immediately flows as a river, without pooling.

== Biology ==
The diatom Navicula trivialis Lange-Bertalot was found in the Vitunjčica.

== Tributaries ==
It has permanent left tributaries Lubardinka (188 metres (617 ft)), Klanac and Rakovac (3.18 kilometres (1.98 mi)). There are also the permanent right tributaries Jarak (1.94 kilometres (1.21 mi)), which flows into the spring of the Vitunjčica, Kobeljak (3.46 kilometres (2.15 mi)), Crni Potok (4.6 kilometres (2.9 mi)), and seasonal right tributaries Bare (612 metres (2,008 ft)) and Bocinka (780 metres (2,560 ft)), between which lie the Zdenac springs. Many smaller springs flow the Vitunjčica from its source to the mouth of the Lubardinka, 3 seasonal or fossil springs from there to the mouth of the Rakovac, and 3 springs with streams on the field after the fishery, 2 springs with streams on the field south of Grabovača, and several smaller springs from the cliffs of Grabovača, all on the left bank.

Crni Potok was first studied in depth in 2017, although it had been mentioned by both Poljak 1926 and Bahun 1968. It is very steep, cascading along most of its course.
