= Bater (surname) =

Bater is a surname. Notable people with the name include:

- Arthur James Bater (1889–1969), British politician and farmer
- James Bater (born 1980), Welsh rugby union player and dentist
- Phil Bater (born 1955), Welsh association football player and manager
