= Podbilo =

Settlement in Lika-Senj County, Croatia

- Settlement
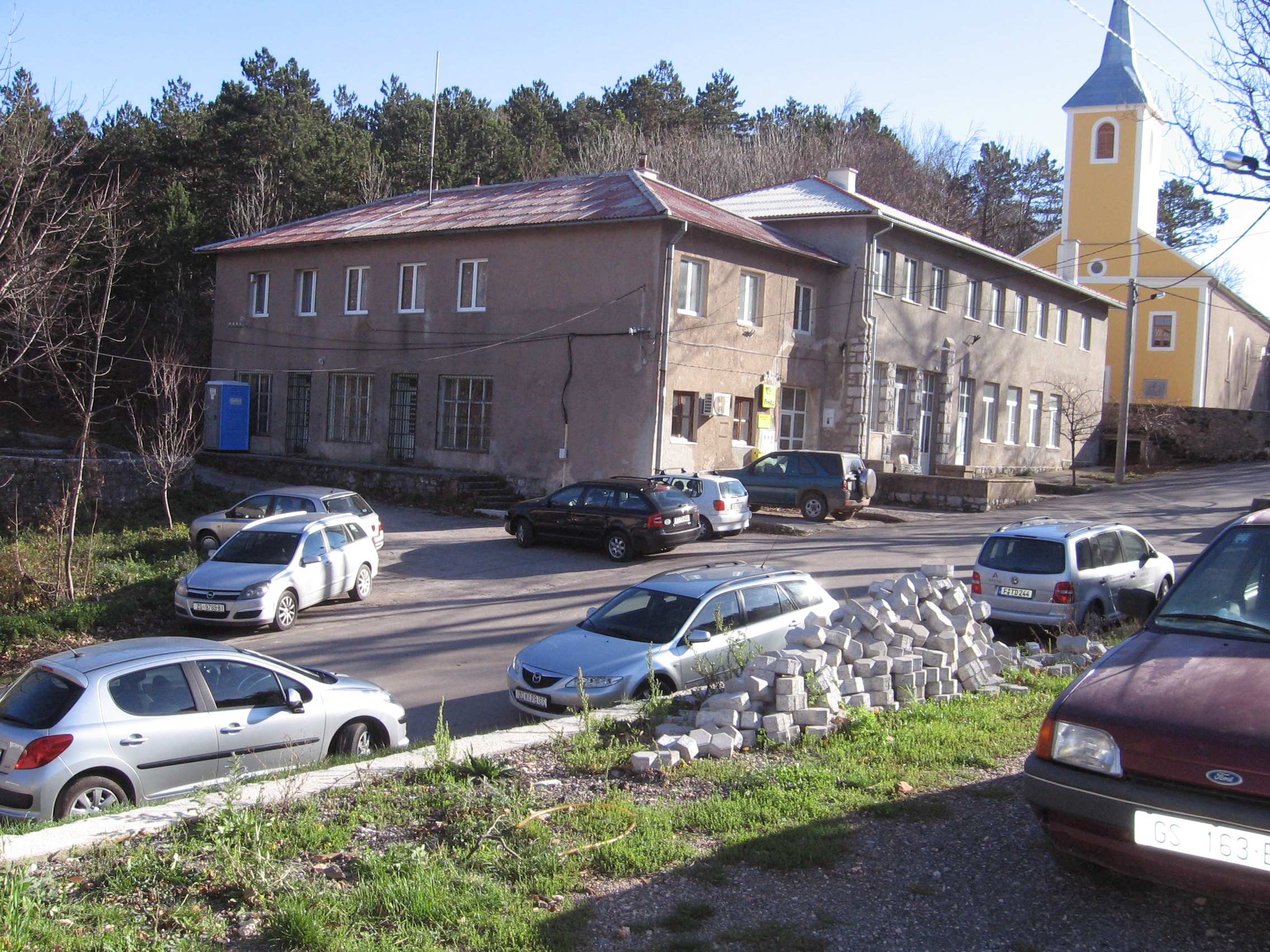
- Interactive map of Podbilo
- Location of Podbilo in Croatia
- Coordinates: 45°02′35″N 14°56′28″E
- Country: Croatia
- County: Lika-Senj
- City: Senj

Area
  - Total: 15.1 km^{2} (5.8 sq mi)

Population (2021)
  - Total: 20
  - Density: 1.3/km^{2} (3.4/sq mi)
- Time zone: UTC+1 (CET)
  - Summer (DST): UTC+2 (CEST)
- Postal code: 53270 Senj

Podbilo is a settlement in the City of Senj in Croatia. In 2021, its population was 20.

== Demographics ==
Podbilo: Population trends 1857–2021
v

| population | | | | 415 | 437 | 573 | 492 | 398 | 378 | 375 | 310 | 181 | 70 | 60 | 46 | 25 | 20 |
| | 1857 | 1869 | 1880 | 1890 | 1900 | 1910 | 1921 | 1931 | 1948 | 1953 | 1961 | 1971 | 1981 | 1991 | 2001 | 2011 | 2021 |

Sources: Croatian Bureau of Statistics publications

In 1835, Podbilo was the seat of an officer's post, and belonged to Krmpote. There were 24 houses, with a population of 265. Its residents were Catholic. A See-Capo with 4 armed men was stationed here to protect its lumber yard and wine cellars.
