= Breze, Croatia =

Settlement in Primorje-Gorski Kotar County, Croatia

Breze
- Settlement
- Interactive map of Breze
- Location of Breze in Croatia
- Coordinates: 45°11′01″N 14°52′19″E
- Country: Croatia
- County: Primorje-Gorski Kotar
- City: Novi Vinodolski

Area
  - Total: 100.7 km^{2} (38.9 sq mi)

Population (2021)
  - Total: 14
  - Density: 0.14/km^{2} (0.36/sq mi)
- Time zone: UTC+1 (CET)
  - Summer (DST): UTC+2 (CEST)
- Postal code: 51250 Novi Vinodolski

Breze is a settlement in the City of Novi Vinodolski in Croatia. In 2021, its population was 14.

== History ==
A 90 hectares (220 acres) fire erupted near Breze on 17 March 2009 and was reported at 13:11, then put out by the JVP Crikvenica and the DVD Novi Vinodolski with 15 firefighters and 4 vehicles, localised by 14:25 and put out by 16:58.

== Demographics ==
Breze: Population trends 1857–2021
v

population			6	228	272	288	306	312	238	337	426	62	10	6	5	4	14
	1857	1869	1880	1890	1900	1910	1921	1931	1948	1953	1961	1971	1981	1991	2001	2011	2021

Sources: Croatian Bureau of Statistics publications
