= Smokvica Krmpotska =

Settlement in Primorje-Gorski Kotar County, Croatia

- Settlement
- Interactive map of Smokvica Krmpotska
- Location of Smokvica Krmpotska in Croatia
- Coordinates: 45°05′06″N 14°51′18″E
- Country: Croatia
- County: Primorje-Gorski Kotar
- City: Novi Vinodolski

Area
  - Total: 2.7 km^{2} (1.0 sq mi)

Population (2021)
  - Total: 29
  - Density: 11/km^{2} (28/sq mi)
- Time zone: UTC+1 (CET)
  - Summer (DST): UTC+2 (CEST)
- Postal code: 51250 Novi Vinodolski
- Area code: +385 (0)51

Smokvica Krmpotska is a settlement in the City of Novi Vinodolski in Croatia. In 2021, its population was 29.

== Demographics ==
Smokvica Krmpotska: Population trends 1857–2021
v

population	38		46	52	61	56	59	52	47	44	31	29	20	29	48	47	29
	1857	1869	1880	1890	1900	1910	1921	1931	1948	1953	1961	1971	1981	1991	2001	2011	2021

Sources: Croatian Bureau of Statistics publications
