= Smokvica, Pag =

Village in Zadar County, Croatia

Smokvica Smoquizza
- Village
- Location within Croatia
- Coordinates: 44.32015°N 15.18818°E
- Country: Croatia
- County: Zadar County
- Town: Pag

Area
  - Total: 0.3 km^{2} (0.12 sq mi)

Population (2021)
  - Total: 35
  - Density: 120/km^{2} (300/sq mi)
- Time zone: UTC+1 (CET)
  - Summer (DST): UTC+2 (CEST)
- Postal code: 23249
- Area code: 023
- Vehicle registration: ZD

Smokvica is a village on the Croatian island of Pag, in Zadar County. Administratively, it is part of the town of Pag. As of 2021, it had a population of 35.
