= Vitunj =

Village in Croatia

- Location within Croatia
- Coordinates: 45°18′N 15°09′E
- Country: Croatia
- County: Karlovac
- City: Ogulin

Area
  - Total: 12.5 km^{2} (4.8 sq mi)

Population (2021)
  - Total: 77
  - Density: 6.2/km^{2} (16/sq mi)
- Time zone: UTC+1 (CET)
  - Summer (DST): UTC+2 (CEST)

Vitunj is a small village in Karlovac, Croatia, a suburb of Ogulin.

Seven kilometers west of Ogulin at the river Vitunjčica, a tributary of the River Dobra (Kupa), are the ruins of the medieval Frankopan city Vitunj, about which little is known, only that in 1575, the settlement was abandoned permanently. During the Ottoman incursions, the area was deserted until 1639, when Frankopans settled Vlachs from Petrova fields.

On the coast of the Vitunjčica River there is a small consumer trout fishing farm.

== Name ==
Vitunj is likely derived from the anthroponym Vitun, itself an addition of the suffix -unъ/-unь to the Christian name Vid/Vit (< Latin: Vitus).

== History ==
=== WWII ===
According to a plaque in Vitunj, having taken the Partisan oath on 15 October 1941, the following died from Vitunj:

- M.? Bogdan
- Cvijetko Busić
- ? Galović
- Gojko Kosanović
- Jovo Mamula
- Franjo Pavičić
- ? Salopek
- Simo Stjepanović
- Dmitar Tatalović
- M. Tatalović
- Ilija Vujnović
- Ilija Vujnović (Note: Two of the same name are commemorated.)
- ? Vujnović
- ? Vujnović
- Jure ?
- Franjo ?

== Demographics ==
According to the Census of 2001, there were 141 residents of Vitunj, with 48 family households.

In 1835, Vitunj belonged to Ogulin. There were 32 houses, with a population of 391. Its residents were mostly Orthodox, but 79 were Catholic.

== Infrastructure ==
An old road used to run from Vitunj over Lumbarda mountain through Bjelsko (by Potok Musulinski) and Gvozd to Drežnica, and from there to Ledenica and Bribir.

== Castle ==
The castle was built in an eastern style.

The castle Vitunj belonged to Ivan Frankopan in 1459.

There is no record of its destruction, but being located so close to a high mountain, Fras surmised it had been abandoned by the Frankopan family because of its increasingly unfavourable location with the advance of gunpowder warfare.

== Bibliography ==
=== History ===
- Lopašić, Radoslav (1894). "Urbar Modruški od g. 1486" [The Modruš Urbarium of the Year 1486]. Hrvatski urbari. Monumenta historico-iuridica Slavorum meridionalium (in Croatian). Vol. 5, 1. pp. 20–81.
  - Republished: Lopašić, Radoslav (1997). Abramović, Ignacije (ed.). Urbar modruški [The Modruš Urbarium] (in Croatian). Ogulin: Ogranak Matice hrvatske. ISBN 953-96393-4-4. Tirage: 500.
