= Donji Zagon =

Settlement in Primorje-Gorski Kotar County, Croatia

- Settlement
- Interactive map of Donji Zagon
- Location of Donji Zagon in Croatia
- Coordinates: 45°08′18″N 14°49′10″E
- Country: Croatia
- County: Primorje-Gorski Kotar
- City: Novi Vinodolski

Area
  - Total: 3.8 km^{2} (1.5 sq mi)

Population (2021)
  - Total: 114
  - Density: 30/km^{2} (78/sq mi)
- Time zone: UTC+1 (CET)
  - Summer (DST): UTC+2 (CEST)
- Postal code: 51250 Novi Vinodolski

Donji Zagon is a settlement in the City of Novi Vinodolski in Croatia. In 2021, its population was 114.

== History ==
On 4 June 1942, Partisans attacked an Italian military vehicle by Zagon, killing 8 soldiers and their military priest and destroying the vehicle. In revenge, the Italian army captured the entire population of Zagon, killed the village elder, burned 30 houses and confiscated their livestock.

== Demographics ==
Donji Zagon: Population trends 1857–2021
v

population	237	270	257	266	290	278	280	310	201	207	197	216	192	148	141	145	114
	1857	1869	1880	1890	1900	1910	1921	1931	1948	1953	1961	1971	1981	1991	2001	2011	2021

Sources: Croatian Bureau of Statistics publications

== Governance ==
=== Local ===
It is the seat of its own local committee.

== Bibliography ==
- Trgo, Fabijan, ed. (1964). Zbornik dokumenata i podataka o Narodno-oslobodilačkom ratu Jugoslovenskih naroda. Vol. V, 32.
