= Gornji Zagon =

Settlement in Primorje-Gorski Kotar County, Croatia

- Settlement
- Interactive map of Gornji Zagon
- Location of Gornji Zagon in Croatia
- Coordinates: 45°10′46″N 14°49′38″E
- Country: Croatia
- County: Primorje-Gorski Kotar
- City: Novi Vinodolski

Area
  - Total: 27.91 km^{2} (10.78 sq mi)

Population (2021)
  - Total: 16
  - Density: 0.57/km^{2} (1.5/sq mi)
- Time zone: UTC+1 (CET)
  - Summer (DST): UTC+2 (CEST)
- Postal code: 51250 Novi Vinodolski

Gornji Zagon is a former settlement in the City of Novi Vinodolski in Croatia. In 2021, its population was 16. However, it has since been discovered to be abandoned. This is likely to have been caused by sweeping Bura winds.

== Demographics ==
Gornji Zagon: Population trends 1857–2021
v

population	384	467	397	426	431	402	411	487	428	444	324	109	24	11	9	8	16
	1857	1869	1880	1890	1900	1910	1921	1931	1948	1953	1961	1971	1981	1991	2001	2011	2021

Sources: Croatian Bureau of Statistics publications
