= Bribir, Primorje-Gorski Kotar County =

Bribir
- Location within Croatia
- Coordinates: 45.161°N 14.765°E
- Country: Croatia

Area
  - Total: 66.5 km^{2} (25.7 sq mi)

Population (2021)
  - Total: 1,480
  - Density: 22.3/km^{2} (57.6/sq mi)

Bribir is a village in the Primorje-Gorski Kotar County of Croatia. It is located near Crikvenica and Novi Vinodolski, in a valley 5 km from the Adriatic Sea. It has a population of 1,695 (census 2011) and the post code HR-51253. It is the seat of the Vinodol Municipality.

== General ==
The remains of the old walls and the city tower are reminiscent of the time of the princes of Frankopan, whose four centuries of rule left deep spiritual and material traces in Vinodol. Bribir experienced its greatest flourishing during the reign of Prince Bernardin Frankopan, who fortified the castle and the city walls. When the Bribir estate was abolished in 1848, the municipal government demolished the Vela and Mala gates and the castle, and a school was built in its place. Thus ended the long and glorious history of the Bribir fortress in the ruins. The only remnant of the Bribir fort is a rectangular tower dating from 1302 and part of the walls. From the hill on which the old town is situated there is a view of the valley and Novi Vinodolski. Renaissance works of art in the church of St. Peter and Paul testify to the high level of cultural and civilizational reach of medieval Bribir and its strong ties with Europe.

== History ==
The Partisan affiliated printing press "Primorski vjesnik" had operated out of Stipičevi Lazi (above Bribir) until a German troop raided the Primorje Command (Serbo-Croatian: Komanda primorskog područja) in nearby Maševo on 20 December. Following the raid, part of the Partisan personnel escaped over Krk to Olib.

== Demographics ==
In 1895, the obćina of Bribir (court at Bribir), with an area of 66 square kilometres (25 mi^{2}), belonged to the kotar of Novi (Novi court but Selce electoral district) in the Modruš-Rieka županija (Ogulin court and financial board). There were 786 houses, with a population of 4183 (the highest in Novi kotar). Its 15 villages and 9 hamlet were encompassed for taxation purposes by a single porezna obćina, under the Bakar office.

== Governance ==
=== Local ===
It is the seat of its own local committee.

== Infrastructure ==
An old road used to run from Vitunj over Lumbarda mountain through Bjelsko (by Potok Musulinski) and Gvozd to Drežnica, and from there to Ledenica and Bribir.

== Notable people ==
- Anton Tus (1931-2023) - was a retired Croatian general who served and was the first Chief of Staff of the Croatian Armed Forces from 1991 to 1992 during the Croatian War of Independence.
- Mihovil Kombol - Croatian literary historian
- Martin Davorin Krmpotić - Croatian priest, revivalist, missionary, essayist, served as chaplain in Bribir
- Josip Pančić (1814–1888), botanist, born in Bribir
- Tomo Strizić (1906–1944), Croatian partisan killed during World War II, posthumously named a National Hero of Yugoslavia

== Bibliography ==
- Antić, Vinko (1984-02-15). "Senjske tiskare u NOB-u". Senjski zbornik (in Serbo-Croatian) (10–11): 335–340. ISSN 0582-673X.
