= Bater, Croatia =

Settlement in Primorje-Gorski Kotar County, Croatia

Bater
- Settlement
- Interactive map of Bater
- Location of Bater in Croatia
- Coordinates: 45°08′59″N 14°51′03″E
- Country: Croatia
- County: Primorje-Gorski Kotar
- City: Novi Vinodolski

Area
  - Total: 4.3 km^{2} (1.7 sq mi)

Population (2021)
  - Total: 93
  - Density: 22/km^{2} (56/sq mi)
- Time zone: UTC+1 (CET)
  - Summer (DST): UTC+2 (CEST)
- Postal code: 51250 Novi Vinodolski

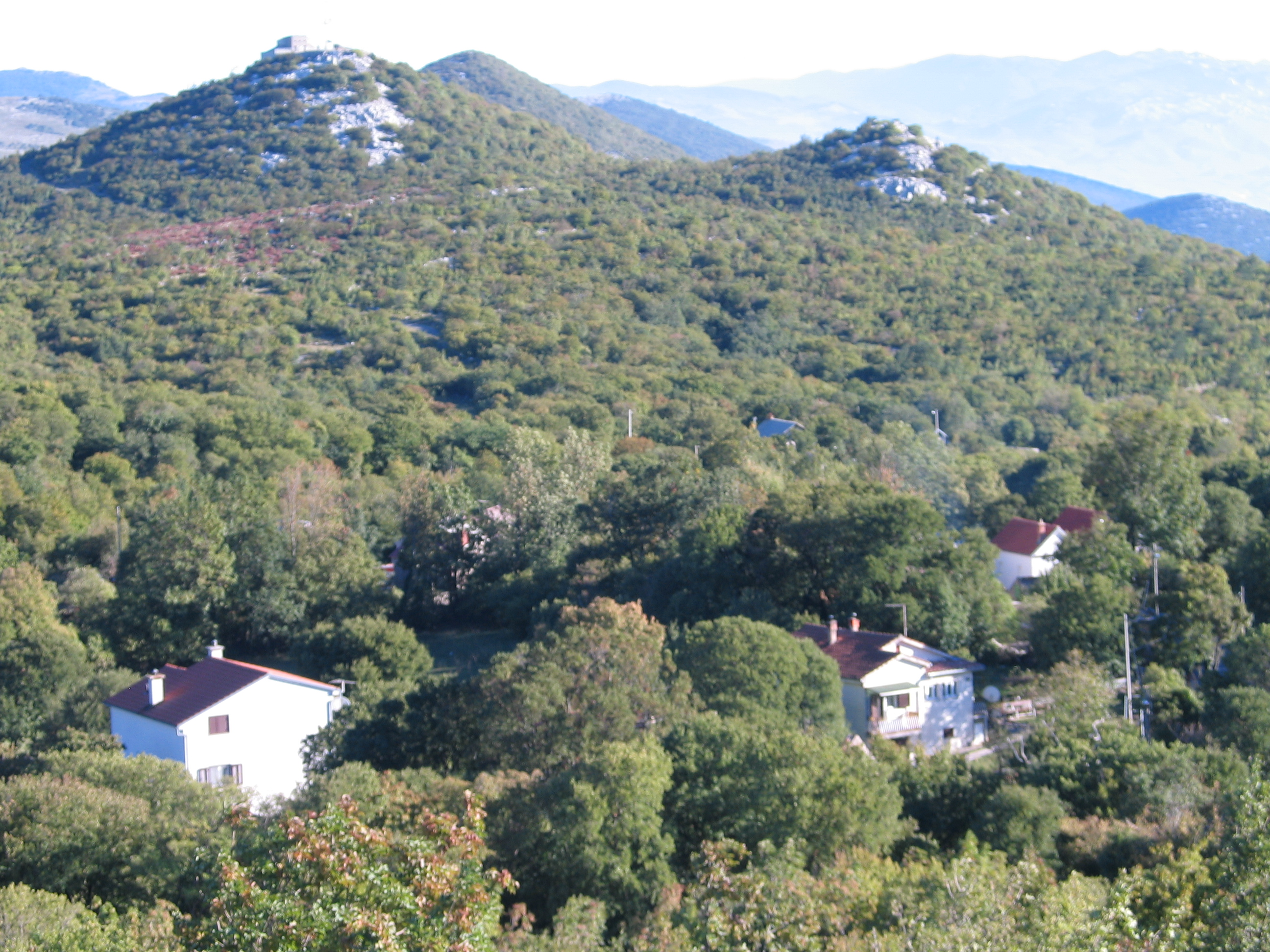
Bater, Croatia from above

Bater is a settlement in the City of Novi Vinodolski in Croatia. In 2021, its population was 93.

== Demographics ==
Bater: Population trends 1857–2021
v

population	452		515	418	456	487	500	446	309	327	307	247	196	144	116	111	93
	1857	1869	1880	1890	1900	1910	1921	1931	1948	1953	1961	1971	1981	1991	2001	2011	2021

Sources: Croatian Bureau of Statistics publications
