= Vinodol Hydroelectric Power Plant =

HE Vinodol
- Location within Croatia
- Interactive map of HE Vinodol
- Country: Croatia
- Location: Vinodol, Croatia
- Coordinates: 45.2298553°N 14.6730794°E

Reservoir
- Creates: Vinodol

Vinodol Hydroelectric Power Plant
- Coordinates: 45.2298553°N 14.6730794°E

Vinodol Hydro Power Plant is a large power plant in Croatia that has three turbines with a nominal capacity of 30 MW each having a total capacity of 90 MW.

It is operated by Hrvatska elektroprivreda.
