= Crno, Primorje-Gorski Kotar County =

Crno
- Village
- Location within Croatia
- Coordinates: 45.133328°N 14.874226°E
- Country: Croatia
- County: Primorje-Gorski Kotar
- Municipality: Novi Vinodolski

Area
  - Total: 11.8 km^{2} (4.6 sq mi)

Population (2021)
  - Total: 8
  - Density: 0.68/km^{2} (1.8/sq mi)
- Time zone: UTC+1 (CET)

Crno is a village in the Novi Vinodolski municipality, Croatia.

== Demographics ==
In 2011, the population of the settlement was 1. That number increased to 8 by 2021. The town's population has significantly declined since the 1880s.

Crno (Novi Vonodolski): Population trends 1857–2021
v

population	362		431	380	344	345	281	199	116	118	101	28	11	3	1	1	8
	1857	1869	1880	1890	1900	1910	1921	1931	1948	1953	1961	1971	1981	1991	2001	2011	2021

Note:No data for 1869
