= Vinodol, Croatia =

Vinodol Vinodolska općina Vinodol Municipality
- Municipality
- Location of Vinodol in Croatia
- Coordinates: 45°12′54″N 14°44′46″E
- Country: Croatia
- County: Primorje-Gorski Kotar County

Government
  - Mayor: –
  - City Council: 13 members

Area
  - Total: 152.9 km^{2} (59.0 sq mi)

Population (2021)
  - Total: 3,226
  - Density: 21.10/km^{2} (54.65/sq mi)
- Time zone: UTC+1 (CET)
  - Summer (DST): UTC+2 (CEST)
- Area code: 051
- Website: vinodol.hr

Vinodol (pronounced [ʋînɔdɔːl]; Croatian: Vinodolska općina) is a municipality in the Primorje-Gorski Kotar County in western Croatia.

The total population of the municipality is 3,577 people, in the following settlements:

- Bribir, population 1,695
- Drivenik, population 308
- Grižane-Belgrad, population 953
- Tribalj, population 621

The population is 93.4% Croats.

The Law codex of Vinodol, a medieval Croatian codex, was made in and named after this region. The Vinodol Hydroelectric Power Plant is located in the region. The Vinodol Channel is the part of the Adriatic Sea to the south of the region.

== Notable people ==
Notable people that were born or lived in Vinodol include:

- Juraj Juričić (?–1578), Croatian-Slovenian Protestant preacher and translator
- Julije Klović or Giulio Clovio (1498-1578), Croatian illuminator miniaturist painter considered the greatest illuminator of Italian high renaissance period

== See also ==
- Geography of Croatia
- Karlići

== Bibliography ==
- Poljak, Željko (February 1959). "Hrvatsko primorje". Kazalo za "Hrvatski planinar" i "Naše planine" 1898—1958 (PDF). Naše planine. Vol. XI. p. 12. ISSN 0354-0650.
