= Zagreb in World War II =

Aspects of Zagreb, the capital of Croatia during World War II

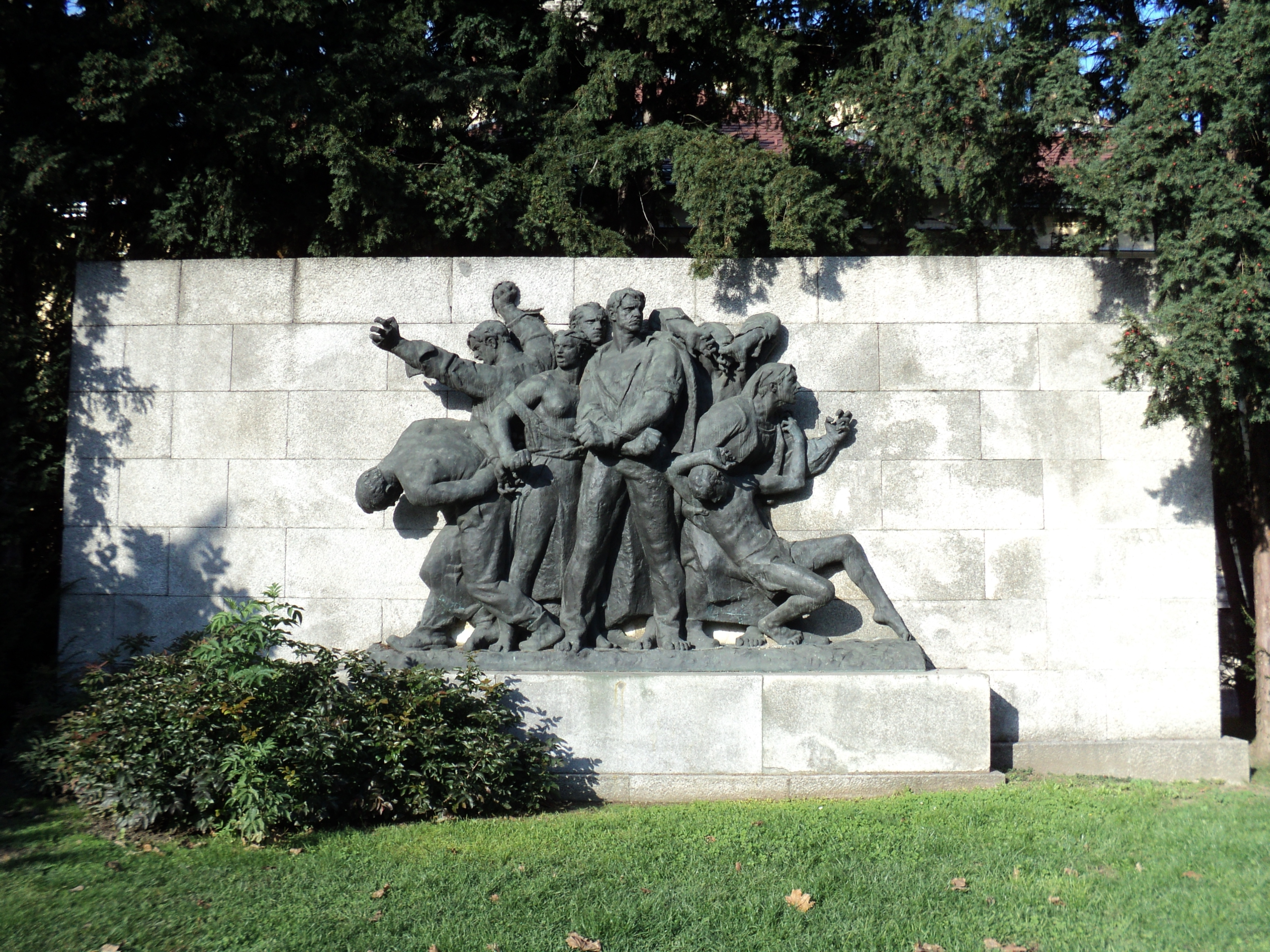
Monument Shooting of hostages, dedicated to the victims of fascism in Zagreb

When World War II started, Zagreb was the capital of the newly formed autonomous Banovina of Croatia within the Kingdom of Yugoslavia, which remained neutral in the first years of the war. After the Invasion of Yugoslavia by Germany and Italy on 6 April 1941, German troops entered Zagreb on 10 April. On the same day, Slavko Kvaternik, a prominent member of the Ustaše movement, proclaimed the creation of the Independent State of Croatia (NDH), an Axis puppet state, with Zagreb as its capital. Ante Pavelić was proclaimed Poglavnik of the NDH and Zagreb became the center of the Main Ustaša Headquarters, the Government of the NDH, and other political and military institutions, as well as the police and intelligence services.

Upon the establishment of the NDH, the Ustaše enacted race laws and started persecuting Serbs, Jews, and Roma. Thousands of locals, primarily Jews, would be killed in prisons and execution sites around the city, mainly in Dotrščina and Rakov Potok forests, or taken to concentration camps and executed there.

Later in 1941, the Communist Party of Yugoslavia started an armed uprising against the NDH, and conducted several operations in the city, but mostly operated underground and in liberated territories elsewhere. The influx of refugees from war-ravaged areas of the NDH nearly doubled the population of Zagreb by the end of the war. In 1943, as the tide of the war started to turn, the regime become even more brutal in the city, esp. starting with a December street hanging, starting a period of mass public repression of the resistance.

In January 1944, the 10th Zagreb Corps was formed. It mainly operated in the wider Zagreb area and Northwest Croatia. The Allies carried out several aerial attacks on the city in 1944 and 1945. The Government of the NDH abandoned the city on 6 May 1945. Most of its military forces had withdrawn from Zagreb by 8 May, when units of the 1st and 2nd Armies of the Yugoslav Partisans took control of it. The Partisans then killed many captured soldiers and civilians accused of collaboration.

In total, more than 26,000 people from Zagreb lost their lives from 1941 to 1945. In 1975, the President of Yugoslavia, Josip Broz Tito, awarded the city of Zagreb with the Order of the People's Hero.

== Banovina of Croatia ==
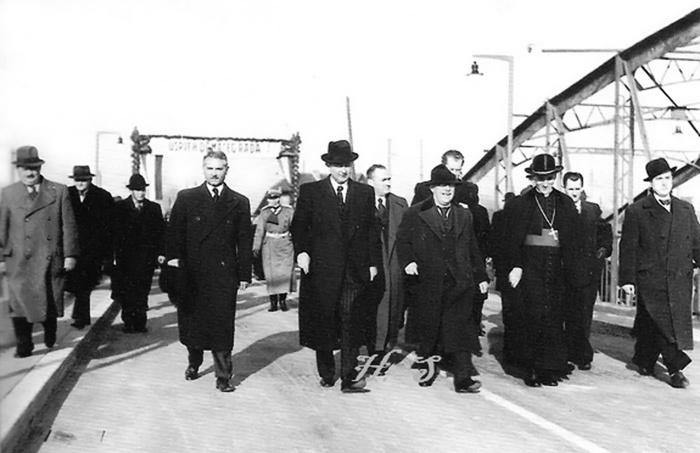
Croatian Ban Ivan Šubašić, Vladko Maček and Archbishop Aloysius Stepinac opening the Sava Bridge in Zagreb in December 1939

In August 1939, a week before the start of World War II, the autonomous Banovina of Croatia within the Kingdom of Yugoslavia was formed, with Zagreb as its capital. The formation of the Banovina of Croatia was negotiated under the Cvetković–Maček Agreement between Vladko Maček, leader of the Croatian Peasant Party (HSS), and Dragiša Cvetković, the Prime Minister of Yugoslavia. Ivan Šubašić, a prominent member of the HSS, was appointed as Ban of Croatia. The agreement was widely supported among Croats, and the Yugoslav government thought that it would strengthen the country.

The HSS expanded its two paramilitary organizations, the Croatian Civic Guards (Hrvatska građanska zaštita) and the Croatian Peasant Guards (Hrvatska seljačka zaštita), which were planned to be the core of the future Croatian army. The Civic Guard in Zagreb had the status of an auxiliary police force. It was established in July 1938 and numbered around 3-4,000 men.

The Cvetković–Maček Agreement, Maček's entry into the Yugoslav government, and the worsening economic situation led to dissatisfaction among some segments of the population. The radical nationalist Ustaše movement considered Maček a traitor who betrayed the idea of an independent Croatia. In July 1938, Mile Budak, the second most influential member of the movement, arrived in Zagreb and started the pro-Ustaše Hrvatski narod (Croatian people) newspaper. The activities of the Ustaše increased in 1940, when the newspaper was banned. Despite the growth in popularity in the late 1930s, their membership remained low.

The Communist Party of Croatia (KPH), established in 1937 as a branch of the Communist Party of Yugoslavia (KPJ), also experienced growth in the late 1930s. However, the HSS kept its dominance, especially among the peasantry. In September 1939, the Zagreb branch of the KPH greeted positively the Cvetković–Maček Agreement. The KPJ later rejected the agreement as an attempt to protect the interests of the Croatian and Serbian bourgeoisie. The conflict within the leadership of the KPH over their stance towards the HSS, the Cvetković–Maček Agreement, and Stalinism, led to the purge of "dissidents" in the KPH, focused around the Croatian writer Miroslav Krleža. The KPH leadership was replaced at the 5th Land Conference, held in Zagreb in August 1940.

In December 1939, a new railway bridge over the Sava River was opened by Šubašić, Maček, and Archbishop Aloysius Stepinac. In late 1939 and in 1940, the HSS Guards units and the police conducted mass arrests of the Ustaše and communists, and arrested the leadership of the newly formed Croatian National Socialist Party. The 1940 local elections, held in May and June 1940, excluded Zagreb and other cities of the Banovina of Croatia.

== Occupation and the establishment of NDH ==
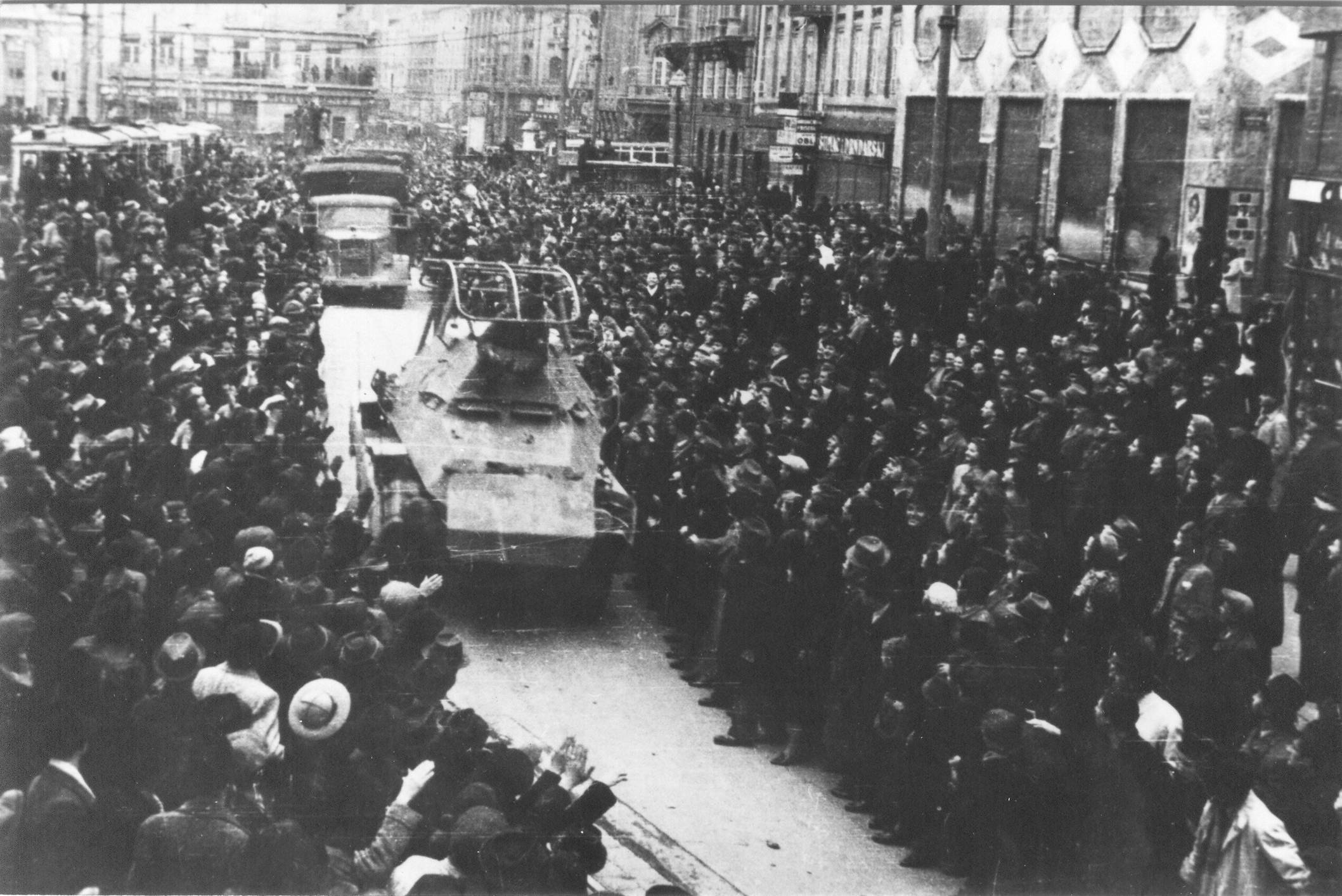
German 14th Panzer Division entering Zagreb on 10 April 1941

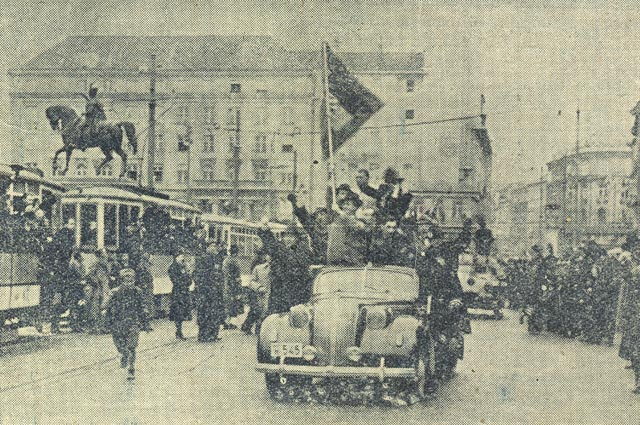
A group of Ustaše in Zagreb on 10 April 1941

Germany put pressure on Yugoslavia to join the Tripartite Pact, which Prince Paul of Yugoslavia accepted on 25 March. Demonstrations against the decision soon broke out and a coup d'état was launched on 27 March. Hitler took the coup as a personal insult and launched the invasion of Yugoslavia on 6 April 1941. Most Croat soldiers in the Yugoslav Army did not feel Yugoslavia as their country and refused to fight for it. The Germans tried to persuade Maček to proclaim the independence of Croatia under the patronage of Germany, but he refused it, so they decided to support the Ustaše instead. Maček returned to Zagreb from Belgrade when the invasion began to help maintain order. His support was not as high in Zagreb as in the rest of Croatia, and many in the city had already switched allegiance to the Ustaše.

On 8 April, a meeting of the Central Committee of the KPJ was held in Zagreb, chaired by General Secretary Josip Broz Tito. The meeting adopted the conclusion that the Yugoslav army has no chance to resist the Wehrmacht and that the KPJ members should report immediately to the call for mobilization, but no armed resistance was organized in Zagreb. The KPJ sent a delegation to the headquarters of the 4th Army in Zagreb, requesting weapons for workers to help in the fight against the Germans. The Command of the Military District refused their request. German agents stationed in Zagreb, the Ustaše and their sympathizers made preparations for the takeover of power in Zagreb upon the Wehrmacht arrival.

On 10 April, elements of the 14th Panzer Division entered Zagreb without resistance and were greeted by cheering crowds. Slavko Kvaternik declared the establishment of the Independent State of Croatia (Croatian: Nezavisna Država Hrvatska, NDH) via the Zagreb Radio Station, with Zagreb as its capital. Most of the population was pleased with the dissolution of Yugoslavia. Kvaternik formed a provisional government in Zagreb on 12 April. Ante Pavelić, who was named the leader (Poglavnik) of NDH, arrived in Zagreb on 15 April. He gave a short speech in which he said: "Ustaše! We have won. We won because we had faith. We won because we held out. We won because we fought. Ustaše! We won because we were always for homeland ready!" Jozo Dumančić was temporarily named the Mayor of Zagreb, replacing Mate Starčević of the HSS. Vladko Maček was forced by the Germans to recognize the NDH. The entire administrative and police apparatus of the Banovina of Croatia was handed over to the new government.

When the NDH was proclaimed, the leadership of the Communist Party was in Zagreb, together with Josip Broz Tito. After a month, they left for Belgrade. Until 22 June, while the Molotov–Ribbentrop Pact between Germany and the Soviet Union was in effect, the Communists refrained from open conflict with the new regime. In the first two months of the NDH they extended their underground network and began amassing weapons. These included Rade Končar, Vladimir Bakarić, Jakov Blažević, Andrija Hebrang, Josip Kraš, Marko Orešković and others.

On 15 April 1941 a leaflet that contained a KPJ manifesto was duplicated and sent to all parts of Yugoslavia. The manifesto emphasized that the "Communists and the entire working class of Yugoslavia would be in the forefront of the national resistance against the invaders" and that "it would persist in the resistance until final victory".

== NDH rule in Zagreb ==
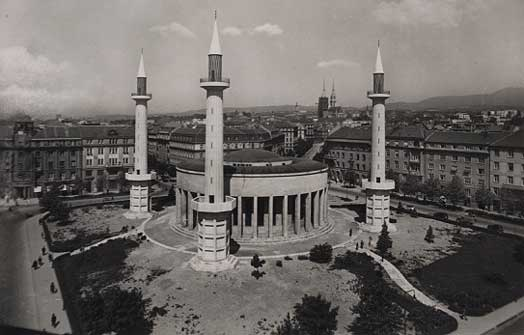
The Meštrović Pavilion was converted into a mosque in 1941 by the NDH authorities

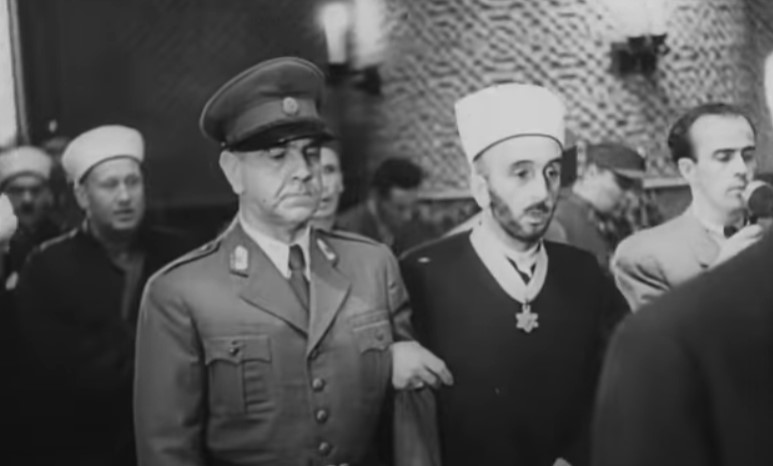
Ali ef. Aganović holds Ante Pavelić's hand during the entrance to the newly opened Poglavnik Mosque in Zagreb, 1944.

In early May 1941 Dumančić was replaced with Ivan Werner as Mayor of Zagreb, who stayed on that position until his death in June 1944. In December 1941 there were anti-Italian protests in Zagreb against the Italian rule in Dalmatia. Stepinac also criticized the Treaties of Rome. In April 1942 the Rebro Hospital was built.

The new government gave particular importance to the Islamic community, especially the Bosnian Muslims which they viewed as Croat Muslims. The Meštrović Pavilion in the centre of Zagreb was turned into a mosque, with three minarets built around it.

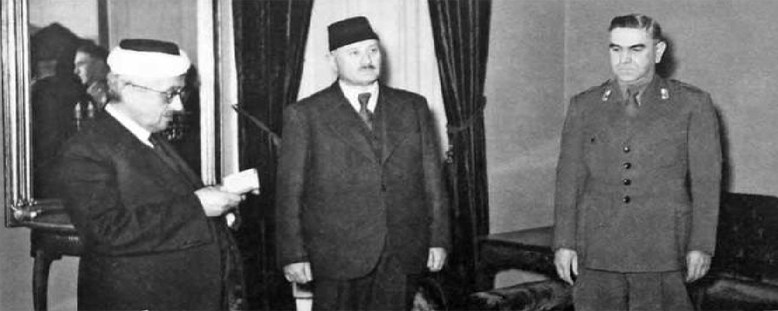
Džafer Kulenović swears in to be a Deputy Prime Minister of the Independent State of Croatia in the presence of the leader Pavelić and mufti Ismet Muftić

In May 1942, the Ustaše organized the Antisemitic Exhibition in Zagreb, and cinema screenings of German antisemitic propaganda films. The exhibition also featured photographs of the various stages of the demolition of the Zagreb Synagogue, which had been located in the city centre and was destroyed in stages from October 1941 to April 1942.

In June 1942 a new religious organisation was formed in Zagreb, the Croatian Orthodox Church. Germogen was named the Metropolitan of Zagreb and whole Croatia.

The population of Zagreb constantly changed during the war as much of the civilian population from regions of NDH where military operations took place moved to Zagreb. At the end of 1941, Zagreb had 218,200 citizens. In the course of 1942, as thousands of refugees began pouring into the city, the population of Zagreb ranged from 350,000 to 400,000. At the beginning of 1944 the population of the city increased to around 417,000.

=== Military ===
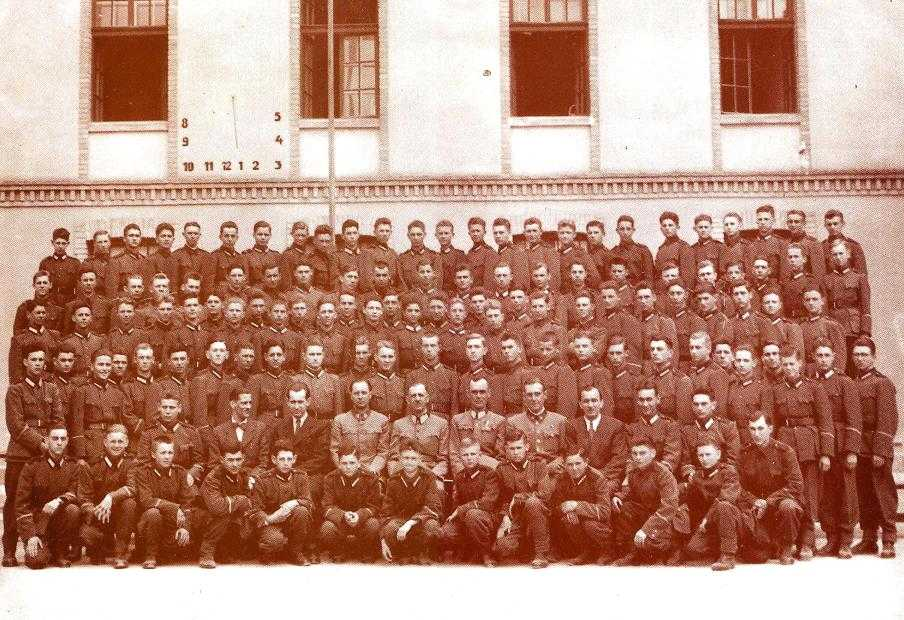
Croatian Home Guard officers' Academy in Zagreb, 1943

After NDH was proclaimed, the main armed forces were stationed in Zagreb, where three units were formed: The Poglavnik Bodyguard Battalion, First Ustaše Regiment and a Company of university students. Later the First Ustaše Regiment was separated into individual battalions. The Croatian Home Guard officers' Academy was founded in Zagreb.

In 1944, the armed forces of NDH were reorganized. Of the 18 standing brigades, the 10th and 25th were in Zagreb, together with the Poglavnik Bodyguard Brigade and the Zagreb Ustaše Brigade. At the end of 1944, the Croatian Armed Forces were formed that unified the Croatian Home Guard and the Ustaše militia. The 1st Croatian Assault Division, 2nd Croatian Infantry Division, 16th Croatian Replacement Division and the Poglavnik Bodyguard Division were headquartered in Zagreb and operated in central and northwestern Croatia. In December 1944, the Partisans estimated the strength of the 3 divisions at 7,000 (1st), 4,500 (2nd) and 9,500 (16th).

=== War crimes ===
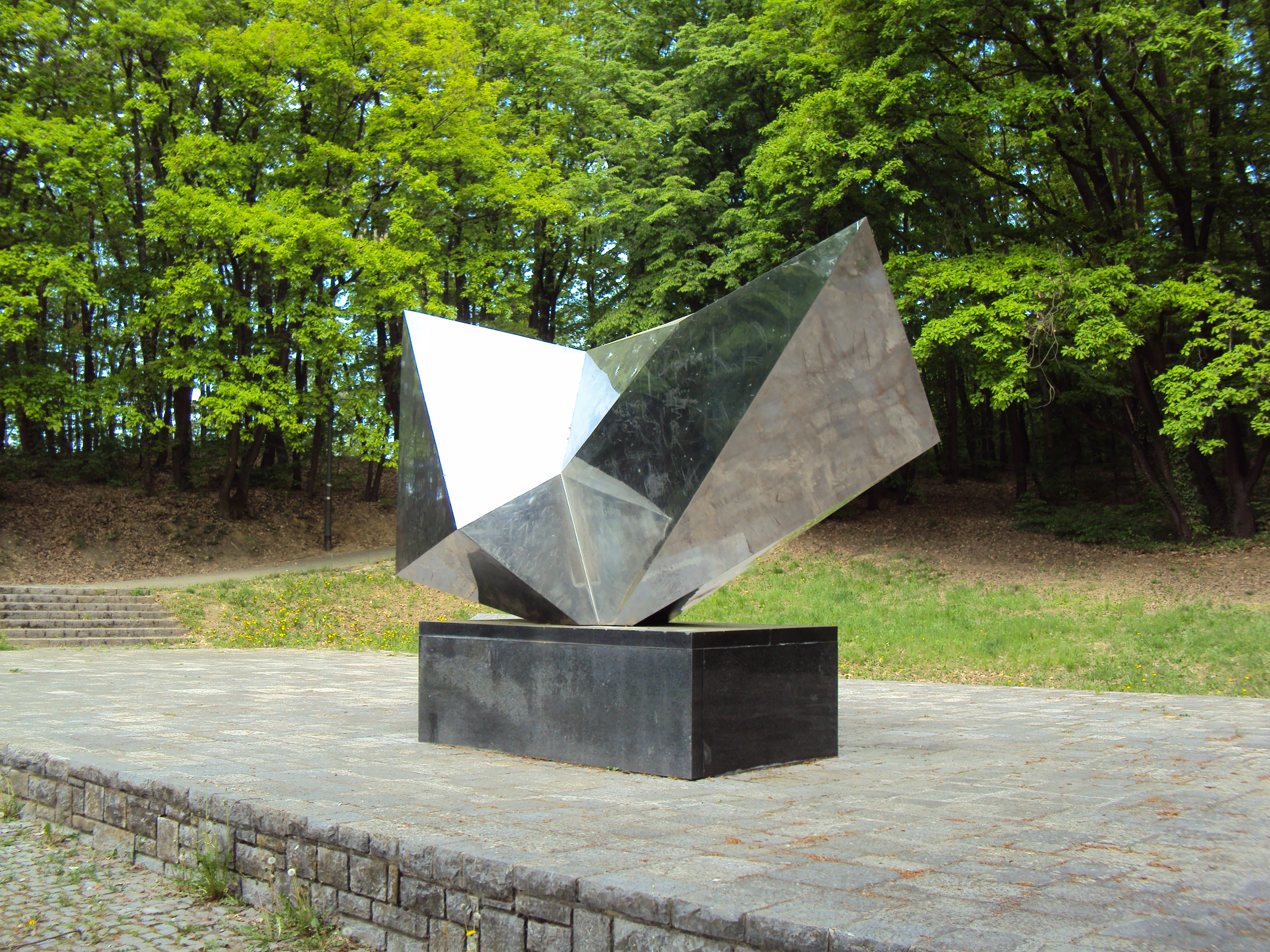
Monument dedicated to the victims executed in Dotrščina, Memorial Park Dotrščina, work by Vojin Bakić

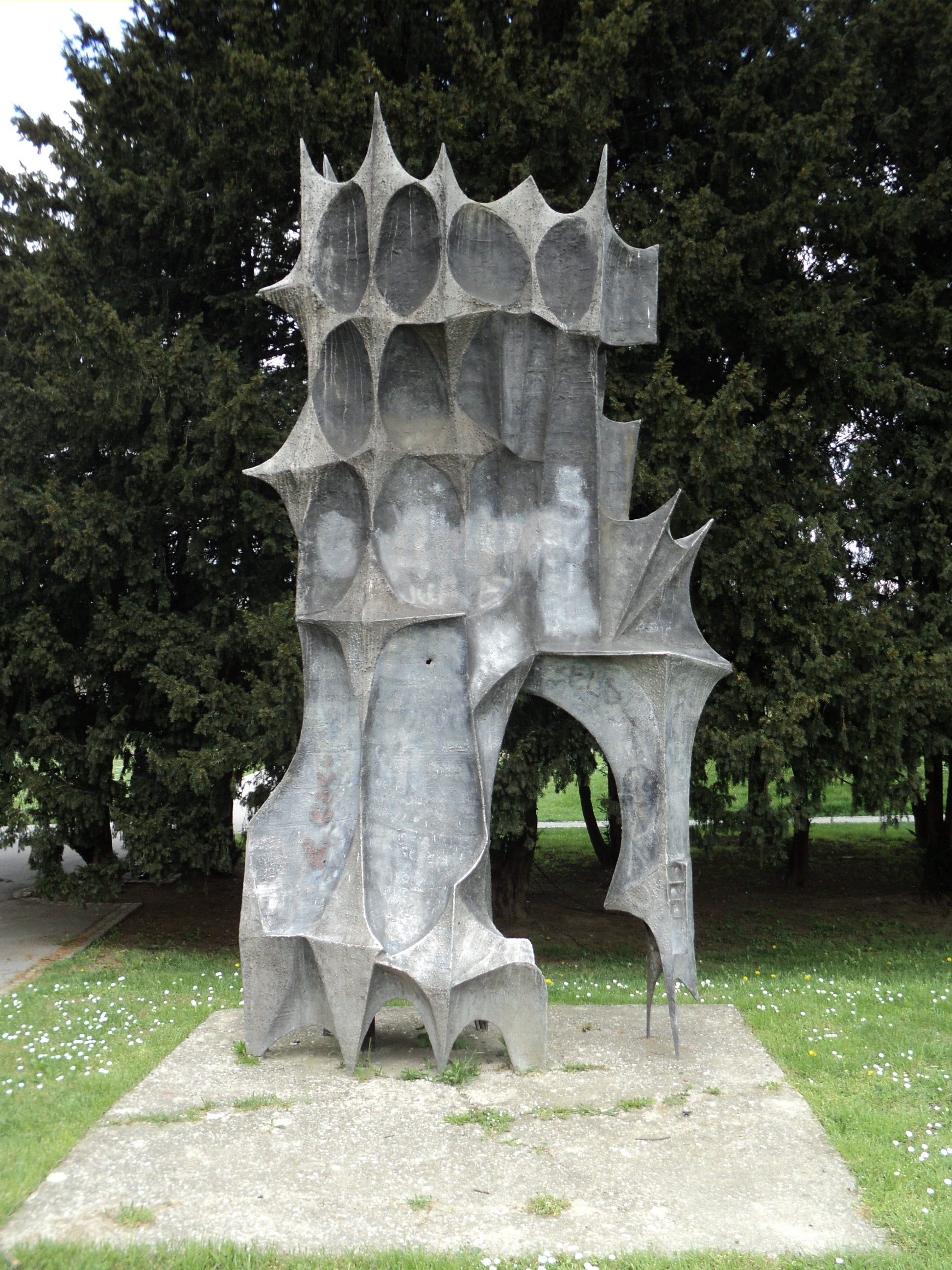
Monument dedicated to the December victims, work by Dušan Džamonja

When Ustaše came to power, they immediately started to spread terror and to persecute their opponents, from May 1941 onwards. During the occupation, Ustaša inflicted abuse and torture of prisoners at several locations around the town, such as a notorious prison on Savska street, the prison on the Square N and a torture chamber in Jandrićeva street 74, popularly known as "Sing-Sing".

Ustaše reign of terror commonly included publicly announced death penalties for anti-fascists, sympathizers, or just civilians in mass retribution for Partisan activities. The woods in Dotrščina, which was at the time located out of Zagreb, and Rakov Potok, a forest south of the Sava river and today's Novi Zagreb, were used as execution sites. It is estimated that throughout the war Ustaše executed about 10,000 people in Dotrščina (2,000 of which were members of the SKJ and SKOJ), and around 400 in Rakov Potok.

The Ustaša regime also enforced racial laws that put thousands of Zagreb's Serb, Jewish and Roma inhabitants at risk of death. By August 1941, the Jasenovac concentration camp was founded, and Zagreb was the main transit point for people being sent to the camp.

The executions of prisoners were made at the aforementioned execution sites in and near Zagreb, but as it became clear that the Axis were eventually going to lose the war, the Ustaše government escalated into public killings of prisoners, so on 20 December 1943 they hanged a group of 16 antifascists on butcher hooks on a public street at the western end of Dubrava. Among the victims was Bogdan Ogrizović, and they were left hanging on poles for several days as a warning to other anti-fascists. It was the first major public hanging of prisoners, a terror tactic that was afterwards used regularly by the Ustaše regime.

In 1944, Ustaše carried out several mass hangings and shootings in Vrapče, Kustošija (Črnomerec) and other locations. In early January 1945, when it was already clear that they would lose the war, Ustaše executed dozens of anti-fascists in Žitnjak from 3 to 8 January.

== Resistance organization ==
At the beginning of May 1941, so-called May consultations of Communist Party officials from across the country, who sought to organize the resistance against the occupiers, were held in Zagreb. In June 1941, meeting of the Central Committee of KPJ, on which it was decided to start preparations for the uprising, was also held. May Day proclamation of KPJ and proclamation of KPJ and KPH on the occasion of the Operation Barbarossa, were restored. In proclamation, all people were invited to the armed resistance, while all patriots were called into a united front for the expulsion of the invaders from the country. KPH remained in Zagreb until February 1942, when it moved to the liberated territory.

The resistance movement in Zagreb was led by the Local Committee of the KPJ which had six rayon committees. At the beginning of the occupation, Zagreb KPJ organization had 53 basic organizations with about 500 members, of which 75% were workers. In addition, there was a strong Youth organisation, the "SKOJ", which, in the first half of 1942, had close to 900 members and about 500 supporters gathered in the boards of the League of the Young Generation. The association organized youth to fight against the occupiers on the anti-fascist platform and was later core of the United League of Antifascist Youth of Yugoslavia (USAOH).

In October 1941, the Initiative Committee of the Women's Antifascist Front of Croatia (AFŽ) was established, at the end of 1941, the Central Committee of AFŽ, and in February 1942 Local Board of AFŽ.

The most massive underground organization in occupied Zagreb was Narodna pomoć (lit. "People's help"), whose tasks included developing combat anti-fascist consciousness of the citizens, raising money and materials for the Partisans, assisting the families of soldiers, harboring illegal aliens, distributing illegal press, and transporting people to the liberated territory. This organisation's local committees were divided into six district committees, which in turn had a total of more than 700 members, and about 4,000 helpers and supporters. By 1943, Narodna pomoć was replaced by the National Liberation Committees.

=== Notable sabotages in 1941 ===
Soon after occupation, the resistance movement organized a series of sabotages against the occupying forces. Ustaše tended to respond by carrying out acts of repression against prisoners in the case of anti-fascist sabotage or assassinations of German or Ustaša officials.

One of the first manifestations of resistance to the occupation was an action of solidarity of the Croatian youth with Jewish and Serbian youth that was conducted on 26 May 1941 in Zagreb's Maksimir Stadium when the leader of the Ustaša Youth gave an inflammatory speech to the students and called for Jews and Serbs to step forward, which was intended to incite a pogrom. When Jews and Serbs began to step forward, young members of SKOJ followed them, also pulling others with them, so that the pogrom was disabled. The 1977 film Operation Stadium portrays those events.

During June and early July 1941, the resistance sabotaged aerospace batteries in Prečko and storage of antiaircraft artillery in Ilica. It also organised the burglary of an ammunition train in the Zagreb Western railway station, as well as a diversionary attack on the railway lines to Varaždin, Sisak and Dugo Selo and Zagreb Radio station.

Kerestinec prison was a prison for the communists that was formed even during the government Cvetković–Maček. Upon coming to power, the Ustaše took over control of the prison, which had previously housed many communist intellectuals, among others August Cesarec, Božidar Adžija, Ognjen Prica, Otokar Keršovani, and Divko Budak.

In early July 1941, Communist Party activists Pavle Pap, Stipe Ugarković, Rudolf Kroflin and others abducted Ustaša police agent Ljudevit Tiljak, a former member of the Party, and killed him after interrogation. The authorities responded by condemning a number of captured Communist Party activists to death.

In the night of 13–14 July 1941, KPJ activists organized an escape of detainees from Kerestinec, but because of poor coordination of operations it was not entirely successful, since only 14 of the 91 detainees managed to escape. Ustaše executed survivors in Maksimir and Dotrščina on the next day, including Adžija, Cesarec and Prica.

In July, the resistance sabotaged a silk factory, where it burned 50,000 meters of parachute silk. A few days later, SKOJ members set fire to wooden parts of Maksimir Stadium, whose panels the Ustaše had intended to use for the construction of concentration camp barracks.

The first major armed action prepared by the KPJ, SKOJ, students and workers, was the one conducted near Zagreb Botanical Garden. On 14 July 1941, 12 resistance movement members, led by Slavko Komar, attacked the members of an Ustaša university company with hand grenades and revolvers, injuring 28 of them. The Ustaša government reacted to this attack with severe reprisals. On 5 August, it was announced that 4 attackers were executed. "In addition, 98 Jews and Communists were sentenced to death by the Senate of the Court Martial as accomplices and intellectual pioneers of the attack." On the following day, 6 August, execution of additional "87 Jews and Communists" as "further accomplices and intellectual originators of the attack " was announced. Radio Moscow reported in a special emission that the Ustaše executed 305 people.

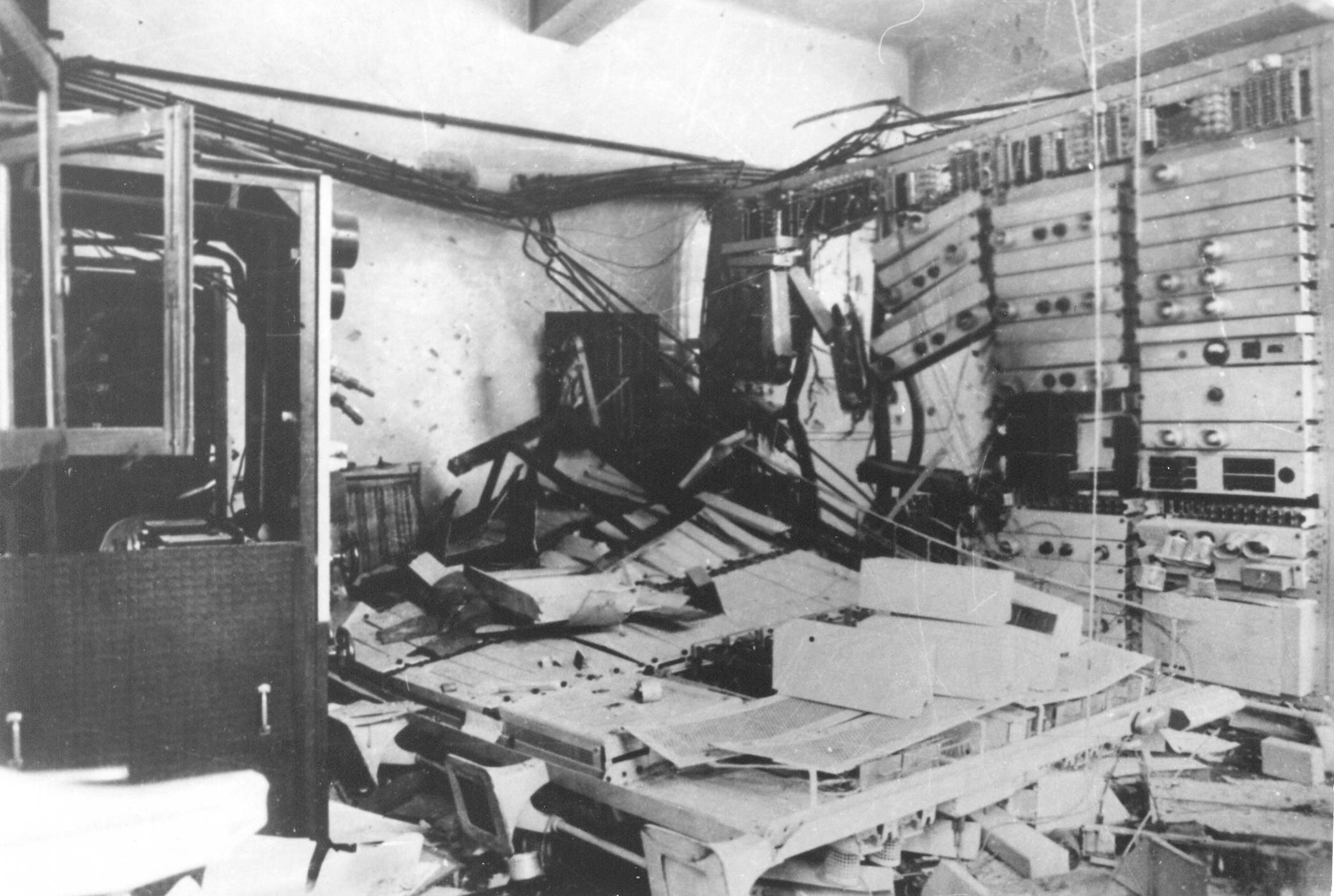
Aftermath of Post Office sabotage

In September 1941, a group of anti-fascists attacked a bus with German soldiers in Zvonimirova street. In the same month, there was also a sabotage in Cement factory in Podsused.

Likewise, members of the resistance in Zagreb organized a successful extraction of Nada Dimić from the Sveti Duh Hospital.

On 14 September a group of anti-fascists, led by Vilim Galjer, conducted a long-prepared Sabotage at the General Post Office in Zagreb, when explosives damaged the automatic exchange device and high-frequency device for long distance communication.

On the same day, a detachment of Ustaše was attacked in Vrbanićeva street, and on 30 September, anti-fascists, led by Ivan Šibl, attacked a group of German airmen in Rusanova street.

=== Partisan military unit organization ===
By the end of 1941, the main focus of the Zagreb resistance switched from diversions to the recruitment and extraction of volunteers from the city to Partisan-held territories. Vladimir Popović, Hebrang, Končar and Bakarić likewise left the city the same year.

The first Zagreb-Sesvete partisan group was formed in Dubrava in July 1941. In August 1941, a group of fighters from Zagreb traveled to Žumberak where they formed a partisan unit "Matija Gubec", which had 37 members, but after it was attacked by the much stronger enemy forces it was dissolved.

The first partisan unit in the nearby Hrvatsko Zagorje was formed in March 1942 near the village Brdovec, roughly 15 kilometres (9.3 mi) northwest of Zagreb. In April 1942, a tenth of fighters was sent from Zagreb to Žumberak where they merged with the First Zagorje unit, after which they grew into the "Josip Kraš" Battalion.

Resistance sabotages also happened during this period. On 12 June 1942 a Wehrmacht gas depot on the Savska Road was set ablaze, destroying around 60,000 kilograms of fuel, several tank engines and machine shops.

In the summer of the same year, the first partisan units were formed in Moslavina (roughly 75 km (47 mi) southeast of Zagreb), and in the fall the first partisan unit was formed at Kalnik (roughly 50 km (31 mi) northeast of Zagreb).

At the end of November 1942, the "Pokupsko-Žumberak unit" and the "First Battalion of the Croatian proletarian" merged into the 13th strike brigade "Josip Kraš" (later named "Rade Končar"). In August 1943, the "Brothers Radić" Brigade was formed, and in the fall of the same year "Matija Gubec" Brigade.

In July and October 1943, the Partisans entered Gornje Vrapče neighborhood, in what was then the immediate vicinity of Zagreb, and also penetrated the Sljeme mountain. In December of the same year, the Turopolje unit attacked the main aviation depot in Sopnica near Sesvete while on 19 December the 18th Slavonia unit destroyed the airport at Kurilovec.

The 10th Zagreb Corps was formed in January 1944. Upon formation it had around 7,000 fighters. At the end of 1944, the 10th Corps had 9,859 soldiers and officers. It became the carrier of fighting actions in northwestern Croatia and especially in the Zagreb district. In late January 1944, the Youth Brigade "Joza Vlahović" and the "Franjo Ogulinac Seljo" Brigade of the 34th Division were formed. In the fall of the same year, so were the Ljubljana Brigade "Pavlek Miškina" and the Brigade "Nikola Demonja".

== Allied bombing campaigns ==
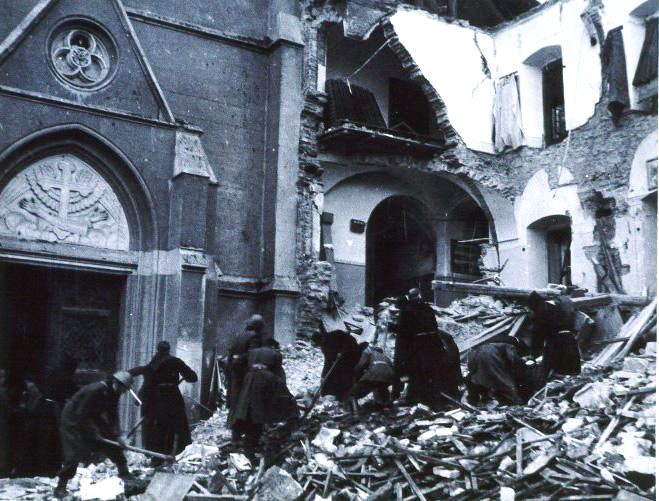
Ruins after the bombing of Zagreb in 1944

The bombing of Zagreb began in February 1944. The objectives of the bombing campaigns were railroads, railway stations and nearby airports, but the city did not sustain major damage, except for a smaller number of residential buildings in the suburbs. According to a victims list conducted in 1950, 404 people were killed in the Zagreb region and 327 people in the city of Zagreb, with no indication whether the bombings were carried out by Allied or Axis forces.

== Zvonimir line and end of the war ==
Zvonimir line
- Part of World War II in Yugoslavia
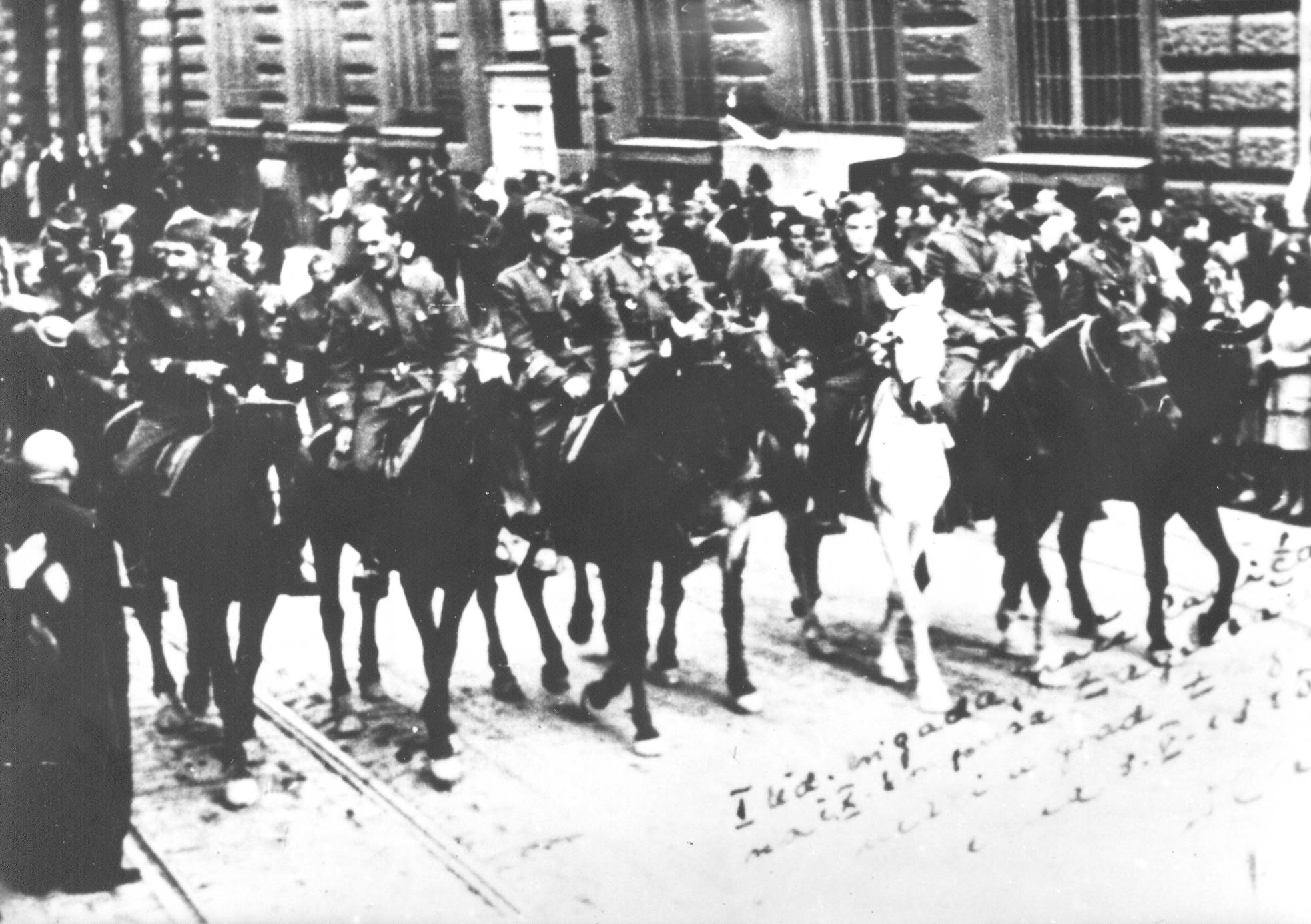
- 10th Zagreb Corps officers entering Zagreb on 9 May 1945
Date	5–8 May 1945
Location	Sveti Ivan Žabno, Ivanić-Grad, Zagreb, Independent State of Croatia
Result	Yugoslav Partisan victory; Liberation of Zagreb

Belligerents
Independent State of Croatia	Yugoslav Partisans

Units involved
(Independent State of Croatia) 1st Division (Nazi Germany) 41s Infantry Division (Nazi Germany) 181st Infantry Divisions	(Yugoslav Partisans) 1st Proletarian Brigade (Yugoslav Partisans) 28th Slavonia Division (Yugoslav Partisans) 39th Krajina Division (Yugoslav Partisans) 10th Zagreb Corps

Casualties and losses
10,901 killed 15,892 captured	Unknown

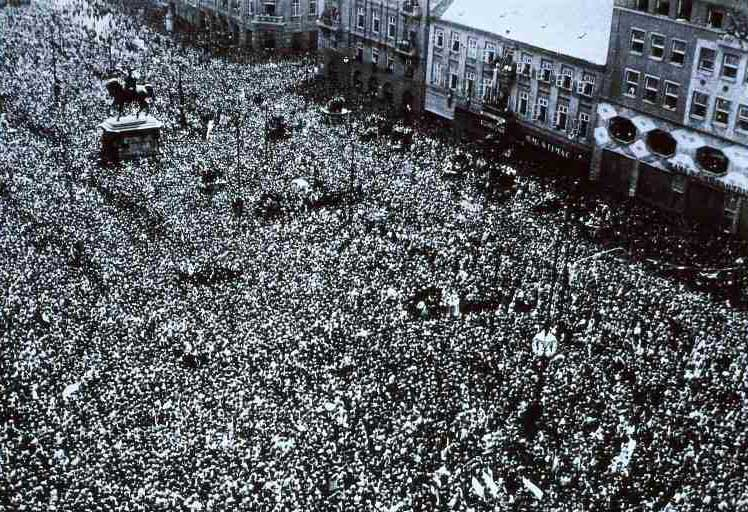
People of Zagreb celebrating liberation on 12 May 1945

In early May 1945, Zagreb was defended by parts of the 1st Division of the Army of NDH and the 41st and 181st German Divisions, deployed along the unfinished fortified "Zvonimir line" between Sveti Ivan Žabno and Ivanić-Grad. The fierce battle with the 1st Army of the People's Liberation Army of Yugoslavia lasted from 5 May to 8 May. The 7 May was the single bloodiest day in the 1,240-day long history of the 1st Proletarian Brigade, with 158 killed and 358 wounded in the fighting for Vrbovec.

In the last days of the war, the city had nearly 500,000 civilians. On 6 May 1945, the collaborationist government of the Independent State of Croatia fled Zagreb. On 7 May 1945, Germany surrendered unconditionally to the Allied powers, marking the formal end of World War II in Europe.

On 7 May, brigades of the 45th Serbian Division, 28th Slavonia Division and 39th Krajina Division of the 2nd Army were on the outskirts of Zagreb. First Partisan units from the 45th and 28th Division entered the deserted streets of Zagreb on 8 May at 11 AM. There were relatively few skirmishes and casualties in the city itself. There were groups of soldiers that surrendered or were captured, many of which were immediately shot. The 1st Army reported to the General Staff that 10,901 enemy soldiers had been killed and 15,892 captured in taking Zagreb. Partisan radio broadcast about the continuous street fighting. The 2nd Army had many Serbs and Montenegrins in its ranks and former Chetniks that were granted amnesty, so most of the population of Zagreb stayed in their homes. The commanders of the 10th Zagreb Corps were disappointed that the 10th Corps was not the first one to enter Zagreb. Colonel Ivan Šibl wrote about it in his diary:

"We felt tricked and cheated. We are still not real soldiers and none of us were satisfied with the knowledge that the battle for Zagreb was already won, in many battles and skirmishes in which our brigades also participated. We were supposed to get there first, but we arrive last to a peaceful, free city. They simply tricked us!"

A few days later, when forces of the 10th Zagreb Corps arrived to the city, people gathered in the Jelačić Square and gave them a triumphant welcome. Journalist and historian Josip Horvat observed the liberation of Zagreb in May 1945:

"I walked through Tuškanac. While walking I laughed like a child - for four years and one month you couldn't go through there. On this little thing I felt that freedom came, that we are entering into a new life. It's so weird at the heart, man with his brain does not realize that fear is gone. (...) Newly arrived army still goes through town, all torn up, but excellently armed, real fighters."

After the liberation of Zagreb, the commanders of three Yugoslav People's Army armies (1st, 2nd and 3rd) convened a meeting in the city with a representative of the Army General Staff to plan how to continue their march towards the enemy forces who were fleeing towards Dravograd and Celje in Slovenia. The pursuit of the Ustaše-led column continued through Slovenia, and ended at the border with Austria, resulting in the Bleiburg repatriations, and a death march back.

== Aftermath ==
According to Zdravko Dizdar, from 1941 to 1945, 18,637 citizens of Zagreb lost their lives. 3,335 people died in the wider Zagreb area in prisons, on the streets, in reprisals and mass terror, 5,293 died in camps (3,264 of them in Jasenovac), and 1,852 in camps outside Yugoslavia, while 1,141 died in reprisals, shootings, prisons and mass terror outside Zagreb. 4,162 died as members of the NOVJ. Around 8,000 died as members of NDH forces, in allied bombing campaigns of the city, or in reprisals after the war. The exact number of people from Zagreb that actively participated in Partisan units is unknown. Yugoslav historians estimated that there were tens of thousands of them. According to Tito more than 50,000 of citizens participated in the Partisan struggle during which over 20,000 of them were killed, half of them as active fighters including more than 4,000 members of the Communist Party and SKOJ.

== Legacy ==
89 people from Zagreb were declared People's Hero, while 600 were awarded Commemorative Medal of the Partisans of 1941.

While presenting the Order of the People's Hero to Zagreb on 16 September 1975, marshal Josip Broz Tito stated:

"Order of the People's Hero which I am presenting today to Zagreb symbolizes the recognition of all the participants of revolutionary events, to all of those who contributed to our victory and the construction of socialism, and especially those who bravely and unselfishly gave their lives in that fight."
