= Dotrščina =

Memorial park in Zagreb, Croatia

Coordinates: 45.857°N 16.015°E

Dotrščina forest park Dotrščina local council

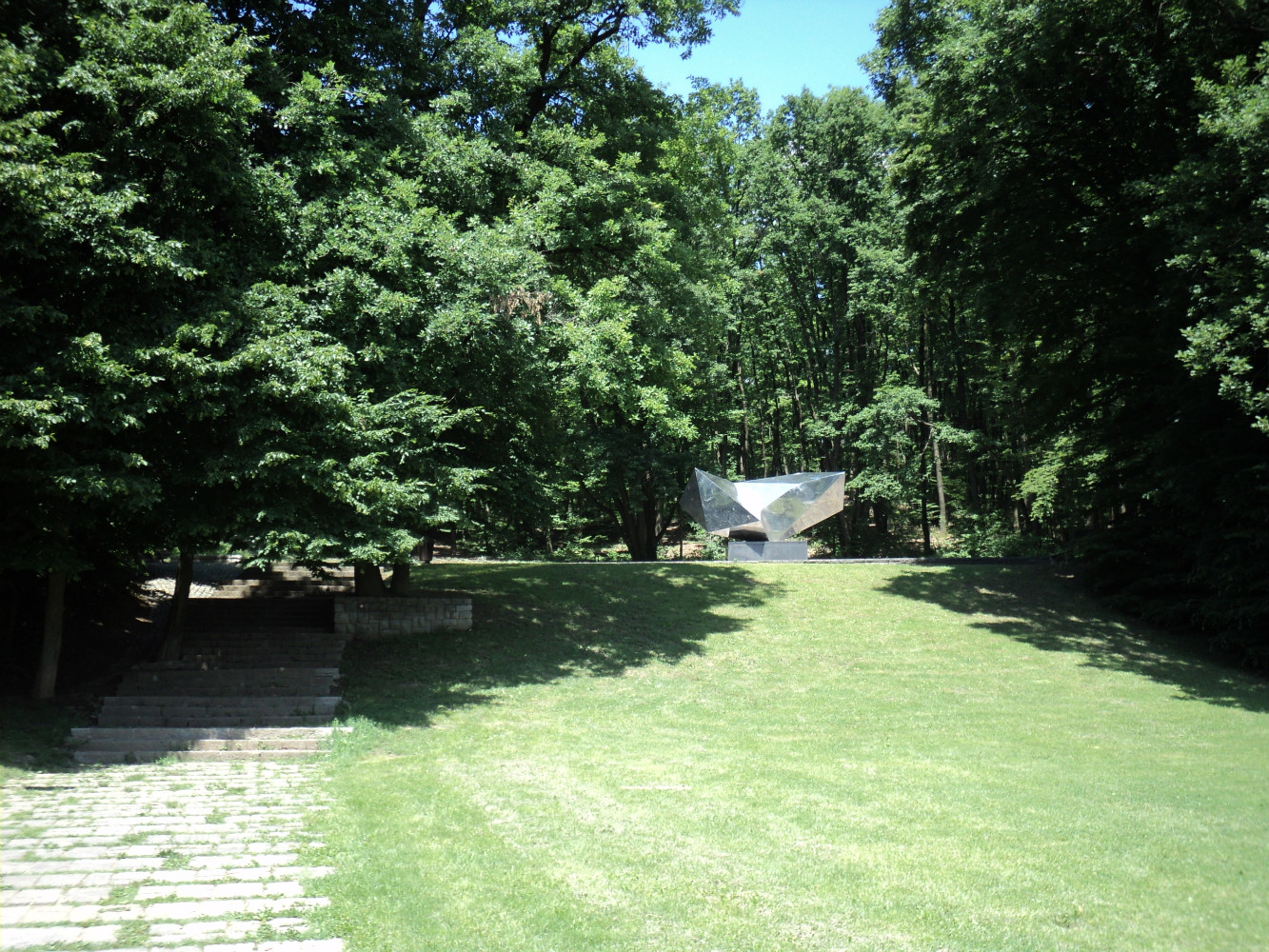
Access to the Dotrščina memorial area

Dotrščina is a forest park in the northeast of Zagreb, Croatia. It is a protected area as a historical site of mass executions in World War II. It is located north of the Maksimir forest park and south of the Medvednica mountain, and includes 365 cadastral acres (approx. 2 km^{2}), mostly of forested area.

The southern side of the area is also a mixed-use neighbourhood of the Maksimir district. The area of the local city council of Dotrščina has a population of 1,983 (census 2021). The northern part of the area is administered by the local council of Markuševec, in the Podsljeme district.

== History ==
During the time of Zagreb in World War II, starting from May 1941, the Ustasha brought their victims here day and night, and killed them systematically. Victims were most often thrown into common pits, and therefore there is no insight into where anyone was buried. According to a research project conducted up to 1986, around 7,000 people were identified to have been executed here. Some notable Croatian intellectuals who were executed here were Ivan Krndelj, Dr Božidar Adžija, Otokar Keršovani, Ognjen Prica, Viktor Rosenzweig, Zvonimir Richtmann, Ivo Kuhn, Simo Crnogorac and August Cesarec.

It is believed that around 2,000 members of the Communist Party of Yugoslavia and the League of Communist Youth of Yugoslavia were shot at Dotrščina.

According to historian and documentary film author Jadran Boban, the project to analyze archive data about the victims at Dotrščina was never completed and it's not possible to state any number of victims with certainty, as it is known that even their raw data of 18,627 deaths in Zagreb during World War II does not include all the Jewish people. It is estimated that most victims at Dotrščina were Croats, largely those executed after various summary judgements and those killed in retribution for the Partisan insurgency (in direct violation of the Hague Convention of 1907), as well as Serbs, Jews and Roma executed under the racial laws. Unlike most victims of the Ustaše regime who were shipped off to far away concentration camps, the executions in the forests of Dotrščina and Rakov potok were generally publicly announced in the city of Zagreb.

== Park landscaping ==
In 1963, the Institute for the Protection of Cultural Monuments of the City of Zagreb signed a contract with sculptor Vojin Bakić, Dr Josip Seissel, Silvana Seissel and Angela Ratković for the spatial design and conceptual horticultural solution of the Dotrščina park, which included the conceptual solution of the Valley of Graves, conceptual solution of the old entrance area from Svetošimunska road and models of two sculptures made of provisional material.

The arrangement of this park was completed in 1968 when Bakić's monument to the Dotršćina victims was finally erected on the plateau at the entrance from Svetošimunska road. In addition to the central crystalline shaped monument made of stainless steel, Bakić created six to seven crystalline sculptures in the Valley of Graves, one of the largest execution grounds in Dotrščina. The entire area and the slopes are covered with ivy so that the victims would be more peaceful. In addition to the memorials, along the road that goes through the Valley of the Graves, there are marble plaques with carved verses by Ivan Goran Kovačić and Jure Kaštelan.

All surfaces and lines on the central sculpture in Dotrščina are reduced to a minimum and simplicity, which creates a certain play of light and shadow, depending on the angle of observation. With this sculpture, Bakić does not define for the visitor what happened here, the sculpture is only an abstract dedication to all those shot there, devoid of any narrative or ideology.

The Dotrščina park was officially called Memorial Cemetery and Park of the Revolution.

=== Park content ===
Dotrščina Memorial Park consists of the following memorial complexes:

Image	Name	Authors	Year built
	Beginning of the "road of martyrdom"	sculptor Vojin Bakić, spatial design by Josip Seissel, Sonja Jurković, Silvana Seissel i Angela Rotkvić	1968
	Memorial to those who were killed in Zagreb 1941-1945	sculptor Branko Ružić, spatial design by Dragutin Kiš	1981
	Monument to those who died for the liberation of Zagreb in 1945	sculptor Kosta Angeli Radovani	1989-1993
	Memorial to the revolutionaries killed on Zagreb streets from 1919 to 1941	sculptor Stevan Luketić, spatial design by Nedeljko Hiršl, verses by Ivan Goran Kovačić („Spring“)	1985
	Valley of graves	sculptor Vojin Bakić	early 1980s

== Unrealized plans ==
The plan also included the creation of memorials to the people of Zagreb who died in the People's Liberation Movement on other fronts in Yugoslavia, on the allied fronts outside Yugoslavia, in the Spanish Civil War, in the October Revolution, memorial museum and a commemorative area with the names of the victims. Due to economic and political changes in the 1990s, further construction of the monuments in the park was suspended.

A plaque explaining what happened at Dotrščina had been placed at the entrance to the memorial park, but was removed and hadn't been replaced as of 2018.

== Literature ==
- Jakovina, Tvrtko (29 December 2018). "Žrtvovanje prosinačkih žrtava na oltaru revizionizma" [Sacrificing the December Victims at the Altar of Revisionism]. Nacional (in Croatian). Zagreb. ISSN 1330-9048.
- Dr Stipe Ugarković and Ivan Očak. Zagreb grad heroj: Spomen obilježja revoluciji. Publisher: August Cesarec, Zagreb 1979
- Mario Šimunković and Domagoj Delač. Sjećanje je borba, Publisher: SABARH, Zagreb 2013
