= Viktor Rosenzweig =

Croatian communist, poet and writer

- Born: 1914; Ruma, Austro-Hungarian Empire, (now Serbian Autonomous Province of Vojvodina)
- Died: 9 July 1941 (aged 27); Kerestinec, Independent State of Croatia, (now Croatia)
- Cause of death: Murdered in Holocaust
- Education: University of Zagreb
- Occupation: Agronomist

Viktor Rosenzweig (1914–1941) was a Croatian communist, poet and writer.

Rosenzweig was born in Ruma in 1914 to a Jewish family. During high school education he became a member of the Young Communist League of Yugoslavia - SKOJ (from Serbo-Croatian: Savez komunističke omladine Jugoslavije). Rosenzweig studied and graduated from the Faculty of Agriculture at University of Zagreb. At the university he was one of the most observed and noticed Marxist around. In 1934, he became a member of the Communist Party of Yugoslavia. In 1935, as a communist, he was sentenced to six months in prison. Rosenweig was a poet who wrote number of poems. Some of his poets were later published in a revolutionary writers collection "Riječi i Djela" (Words and Acts). In April 1941, after Independent State of Croatia establishment, Rosenzweig was arrested and imprisoned at Savska cesta prison. On July 9, 1941 Rosenzweig was killed by Ustaše together with Božidar Adžija, Otokar Keršovani, Ognjen Prica and Zvonimir Richtmann.

== Published works ==
- Naš život, Orbis Zagreb, 1939

== Bibliography ==
- Snješka Knežević, Aleksander Laslo (2011). Židovski Zagreb. Zagreb: AGM, Židovska općina Zagreb. ISBN 978-953-174-393-8.
- Goldstein, Ivo (2001). Holokaust u Zagrebu. Zagreb: Novi Liber. ISBN 953-6045-19-2.
