= Erdödy castle, Kerestinec =

Kerestinec Castle, Croatia

Kerestinec Castle
- Dvorac Kerestinec
- Kerestinec, Croatia
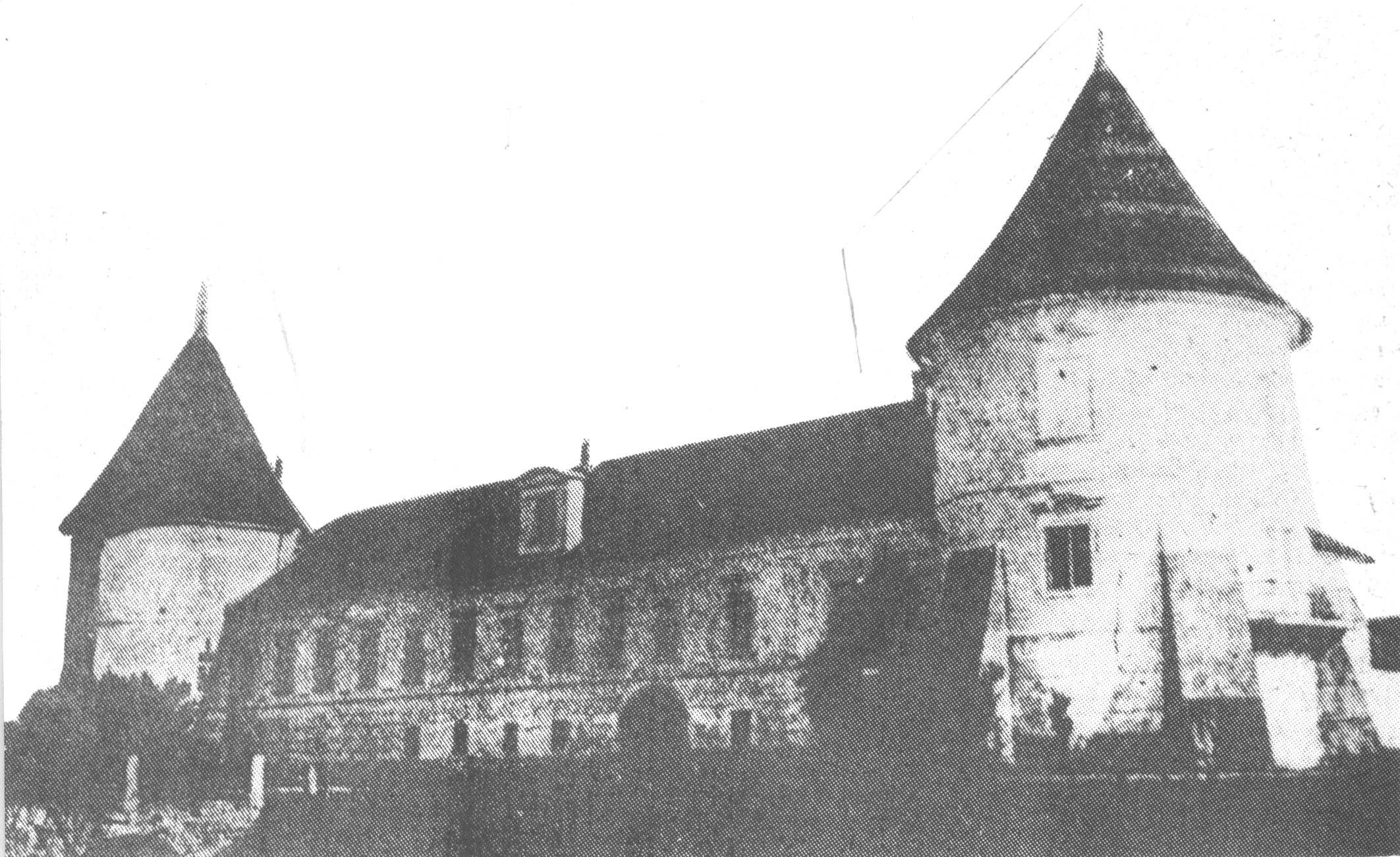
- Kerestinec Castle

Site information
- Type: Renaissance castle
- Code: HR
- Owner: Town of Sveta Nedelja

Location
- Coordinates: 45.7745°N 15.8172°E

Site history
- Built: 1575
- Built by: Erdödy family
- In use: 16th–20th century

Kerestinec Castle (Croatian: Dvorac Kerestinec or Dvorac Erdödy u Kerestincu) is a castle constructed by the Erdödy family in Kerestinec, Croatia, near the town of Sveta Nedelja. It is a 1st category monument. It is a two-story structure with a square layout and cylindrical corner towers and open arcades in the courtyard. This is a Renaissance castle with fortified elements.

In 1565, Petar II. Erdödy (1504–1567) was awarded the noble title of count, and already then was actively working on the construction of the castle at Kerestinec, surrounded by a wide moat. In 1575, the castle was expanded and renewed, and works continued until the late 16th century. It was rebuilt in the 18th and 19th centuries, and fully refurnished in the early 20th century.

Historical sources record the participation of the Kerestinec peasants, living around the castle, in the great Peasants' Revolt of 1573, during which the castle was badly damaged. The castle was also the site of the Kerestinec Revolt of 1936.

The castle housed several Croatian bans, with ban Antun Mihalović serving last on that position during Austria-Hungary. Castle also served as location of several sessions of Croatian parliament during 17th and 18th century.

During World War II, the castle served as a prison camp, first operated by the government of Yugoslavia, and later by the Ustaše movement. After the war, it housed the military. Today it is still awaiting a new purpose. A series of events are held in the castle throughout the year.

== See also ==
- Church of the Most Holy Trinity, Sveta Nedelja
- St. Rocco Chapel, Sveta Nedelja
- Zagreb County
