= August Cesarec =

Croatian writer (1893–1941)

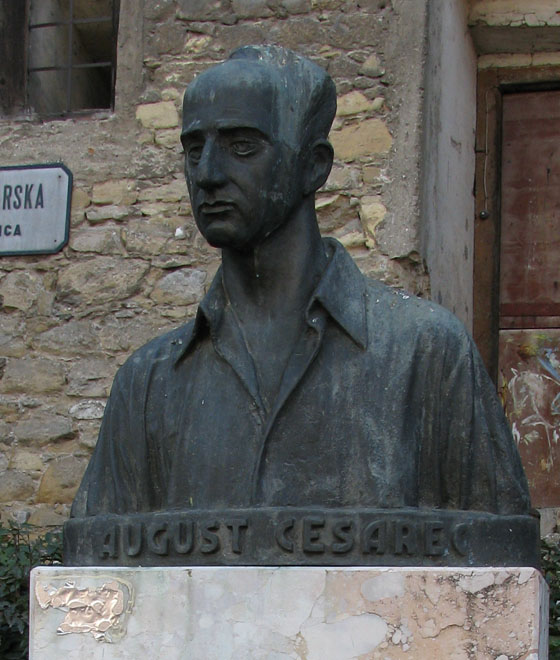
A bust of August Cesarec in Tkalčićeva Street, Zagreb

August Cesarec (4 December 1893 – 17 July 1941) was a Croatian writer and communist activist from the interwar period.

Cesarec was born in Zagreb, then part of Austria-Hungary. He was the son of a carpenter who was a member of the Social Democratic Party, and August himself published a short story in the party's magazine as early as 1910. As a high-school student he became involved in radical nationalist politics and joined the group that tried to assassinate Croatian ban (viceroy) Slavko Cuvaj in 1912. For his role in the failed assassination he received a prison sentence of two years, which he served in Sremska Mitrovica penitentiary (in present-day Serbia). He was provisionally released after 21 months because he contracted tuberculosis. In prison he began to study books by Stirner and Kropotkin, which gradually led him to adopt Marxist philosophy. When World War I started, Austro-Hungarian police put him on a watchlist. In 1915 he was drafted in the Austro-Hungarian Army, and spent most of the war in Kruševac, from where he returned in 1918. By the end of the war he became an enthusiastic supporter of the Russian 1917 October Revolution and of Communism.

After the war, he became a member of the Communist Party of Yugoslavia. Consequently he often had to deal with police; in 1919 was implicated in the so-called Diamantstein affair, which made him escape to Prague and Vienna. In 1920 he returned, but next year the Kingdom of Yugoslavia issued the Proclamation (Obznana) which banned the Communist Party and he went underground. Cesarec was collaborating with the terrorist organization Crvena pravda to the extent of being there for Alija Alijagić the night before he was executed for assassinating the Yugoslav Minister of Internal Affairs. Later he published favorable obituaries of Alijagić, which led to multiple incarcerations.

Cesarec, who had discovered his literary talent in his teenage years, became known as one of the leading Croatian literary figures of his time.

Together with Miroslav Krleža he was one of the founders of the literary magazine Plamen in 1919. Cesarec had a significant body of work in literary magazines, over 200 articles in total, two collections of which were separately published in the Kingdom of Yugoslavia.

He initially wrote a number of poems, which were often an expression of his feelings and ideas on social and political issues. He later stopped writing poems and switched to prose. He wrote about seventy works of prose, most of them short stories and novellas, with some novels, a handful of dramas and some travel memoirs (not all of which were literary). The bulk of these were written between 1922 and 1932. Only a third of these had been published during his lifetime.

In 1922 he fled to Moscow for a congress of the Comintern, and as he returned in 1923 he was captured and sentenced to six months prison time. In 1928 he became a member of Matica hrvatska in response to anti-Croatian politics of the Yugoslav regime, and in 1929 he was briefly jailed again. In 1933, he left Matica hrvatska because he did not agree with the prevailing pro-fascist influences in the organization at the time.

In 1934, he illegally crossed the border again to attend the First Congress of Soviet Writers in Moscow and then the 7th Congress of the Comintern in 1935. In 1937, he went to Spain during the Spanish Civil War of 1936-1939. He then went to Paris, and in 1938 returned to Yugoslavia, where he was arrested at the border again.

Cesarec was a known polemicist, having contributed to Plamen, Borba, Književna republika, Komunista, Zaštita čovjeka, Nova riječ and Izraz.

He often argued for Marxist points of view, having redacted and prepared for print the Serbo-Croatian translation of Das Kapital made by Moše Pijade and Rodoljub Čolaković. At the same time, Cesarec advocated for the Croatian peasant movements led by Stjepan Radić, against Greater Serbian hegemony, and was one of the first people at the time to publicly recognize the Macedonians as a nation. He was also one of the first people among his contemporaries in Yugoslavia to write about Adler's individual psychology. Another one of the topics he was known for was arguing against the regressive nature of fascism and evaluating the work of Ante Starčević and Eugen Kvaternik as revolutionaries and against the clerical and Frankist (far-right) interpretations. As World War II started in Europe, he provided insightful analysis of world events and predicted the demise of the Molotov–Ribbentrop Pact.

In March 1941, a few days before the Axis invasion of Yugoslavia, he was arrested and interned in Kerestinec prison in Croatia, together with some 90 leading members of the Croatian left-wing intelligentsia. A few weeks later the prison was taken over by the new Ustasha regime. On 9 July, the Ustasha had ten prisoners, including Božidar Adžija, Otokar Keršovani and Ognjen Prica, shot in retaliation for Partisan activities. Fearing the impending execution of the rest of the inmates, the Croatian Communist Party organised a prison-break on the night of 13 July 1941. The prison guards were overpowered and inmates escaped. But the operation proved poorly organised, and most of the prisoners, including Cesarec, were quickly recaptured and shot in the Maksimir woods. There are no exact records on his death, but it is assumed that he was part of a group shot on 17–18 July in the Dotrščina forest.

The manuscripts of August Cesarec are preserved in the Archive of the Croatian Institute of History. A number of monographs were made about him, including those published in Zagreb 1946–1964, a collection published in Belgrade/Zagreb/Sarajevo in 1964, a section in the "Five centuries of Croatian literature" published in Zagreb in 1966, and collections published in Zagreb 1970–1972 and then in 1982–1986.

Posthumously, his novels Careva kraljevina, Zlatni mladić and Bjegunci achieved the most acclaim, in addition to the short story Tonkina jedina ljubav.

The phrase zlatni mladić, lit. 'golden youth', based on the protagonist of his 1920s novel who engaged in excesses of nouveau riche, entered the general vocabulary in Croatia.

The local administration unit in the center of Zagreb that includes the Ban Jelačić Square was named after Cesarec.
