= Adžija =

Adžija or Adzija is a surname. Notable people with the surname include:

- Božidar Adžija (1890–1941), Croatian and Serbian publicist and communist
- Lexie Adzija (born 2000), Canadian ice hockey player
