= Most Holy Trinity Church =

Most Holy Trinity Church or Church of the Most Holy Trinity may refer to:

== Croatia ==
- Church of the Most Holy Trinity, Sveta Nedelja

== India ==
- Holy Trinity Church, Powai, also called Most Holy Trinity Church

== Italy ==
- Santissima Trinità, Cattinara (Church of the Most Holy Trinity, Cattinara, Trieste)
- Santissima Trinità dei Pellegrini, Rome (Church of the Most Holy Trinity of the Pilgrims)

== Portugal ==
- Basilica of the Holy Trinity (Fátima), locally known as Church of the Most Holy Trinity

== Slovakia ==
- Most Holy Trinity Church, Tvrdošín

== United States ==
- Most Holy Trinity Church, Detroit, Michigan
- Church of the Most Holy Trinity, Veseli, Minnesota
- Most Holy Trinity Church, Mamaroneck, Westchester County, New York
- Most Holy Trinity–St. Mary Catholic Church, Brooklyn, New York
- St. Ann & the Holy Trinity Church, Brooklyn, New York

== See also ==
- Holy Trinity Church (disambiguation)
- Trinity Church (disambiguation)
