= Zvonimir Richtmann =

Croatian physicist

- Born: 22 November 1901; Zagreb, Austro-Hungarian Empire
- Died: 9 July 1941 (aged 39); Kerestinec, Independent State of Croatia
- Cause of death: Murdered in Holocaust
- Education: University of Zagreb

Zvonimir Richtmann (22 November 1901 – 9 July 1941) was a Croatian-Jewish physicist, philosopher, politician and publicist who was killed during World War II by Ustaše.

== Biography ==
Richtmann was born on 22 November 1901 in Zagreb, where he achieved his education. He studied at the Vienna University of Technology from where he graduated in 1925, and at the Faculty of Humanities and Social Sciences, University of Zagreb which he finished and graduated from in 1932. After graduation, Richtmann taught as a professor at the engineering high school in Zagreb. Richtmann held many public lectures and has published articles about physics. He is the author of several high school textbooks in physics and has written a book Sigmund Freud in 1937. He published articles about the relationship between modern science and philosophy which brings into question the Marxist–Leninist dogma. As a left-winger he was one of the key protagonists of the "left conflict" in Croatia. His article "Upheaval in the scientific picture of the world" was published in the first issue of Miroslav Krleža magazine "Seal". Article caused persecution of Richtmann and Krleža, who took him in protection. After that, Richtmann was proclaimed as revisionist and Trotskyist, and was systematically attacked. In 1939, Josip Broz Tito attacked Richtmann in the magazin "Proletarian" with the article "Trotskyism and it's helpers". As a leftist he was repeatedly imprisoned.

In April 1941, after the establishment of the Independent State of Croatia, Richtmann was arrested and imprisoned at Savska cesta prison. He was later moved to Kerestinec prison. Communists, with whom he was imprisoned, boycotted Richtmann and at their request he was moved to another cell. On 9 July 1941 Richtmann was killed by Ustaše together with Božidar Adžija, Otokar Keršovani, Ognjen Prica and Viktor Rosenzweig.

== Bibliography ==
- Knežević, Snješka; Laslo, Aleksander (2011). Židovski Zagreb. Zagreb: AGM, Židovska općina Zagreb. ISBN 978-953-174-393-8.
- Kraus, Ognjen (1998). Dva stoljeća povijesti i kulture Židova u Zagrebu i Hrvatskoj. Zagreb: Židovska općina Zagreb. ISBN 953-96836-2-9.
- Stuparić, Darko (1997). Tko je tko u NDH: Hrvatska 1941.–1945. Zagreb: Minerva. ISBN 953-6377-03-9.
- Goldstein, Ivo (2001). Holokaust u Zagrebu. Zagreb: Novi Liber. ISBN 953-6045-19-2.
