= Cattinara =

Neighbourhood in Trieste, Italy

Cattinara Katinara (Slovene)
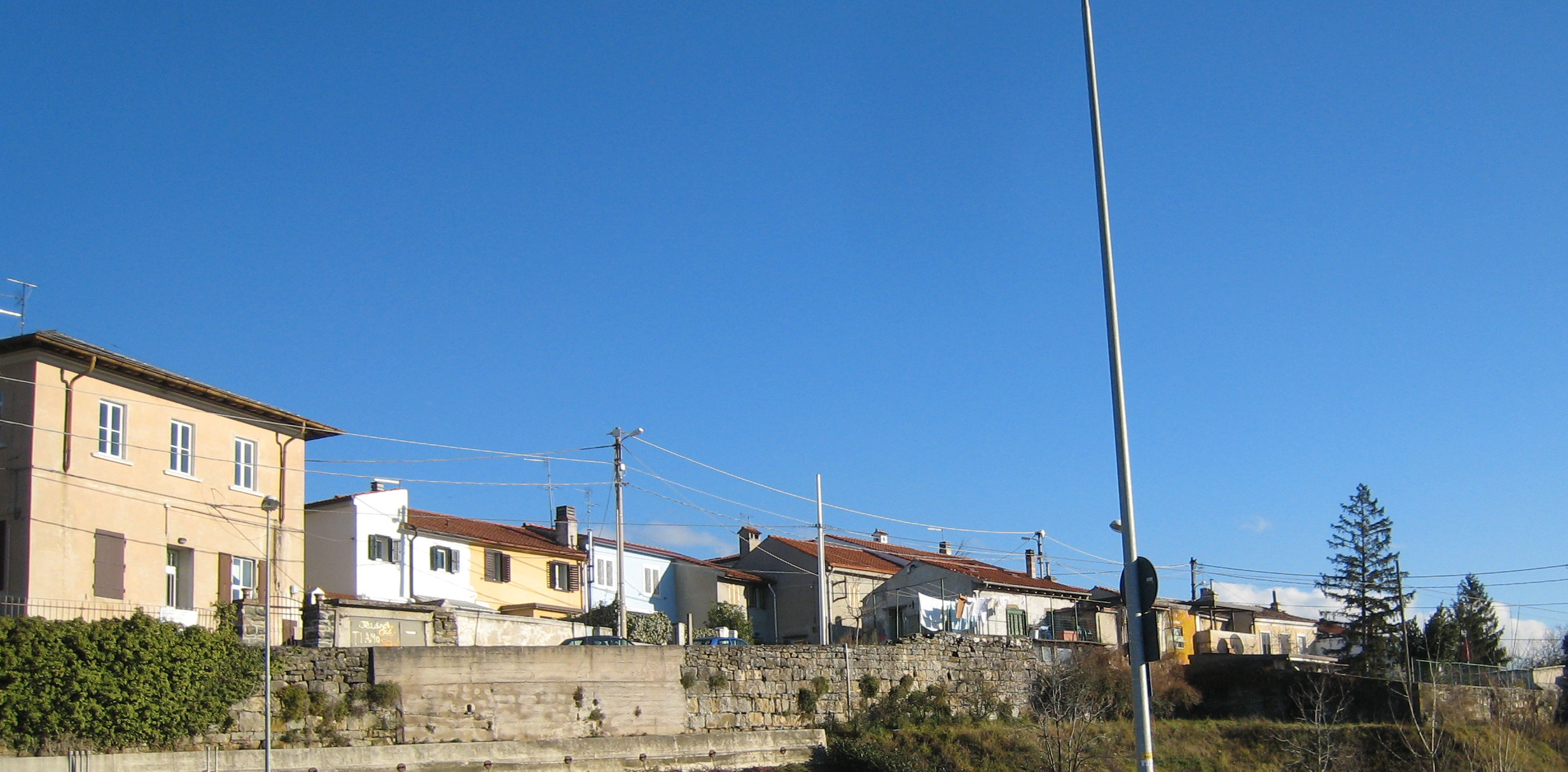

- Location within Italy Location within Friuli-Venezia Giulia
- Coordinates: 45°38′03″N 13°49′20″E
- Country: Italy
- Region: Friuli-Venezia Giulia
- Frazione: Trieste
- Postal code: 34149
- Area code: 040

Cattinara (Italian: [kattiˈnaːra]; Slovene: Katinara) is a district ("quartiere") of Trieste, Italy, ocated to the east, along the commercial road that connects the city with that of Rijeka.

== History ==
Already inhabited in pre-Roman times (in the area of the Longera saddle, there are remains of an ancient castelliere), the first mention is in an Istrian diplomatic code dated 5 November 1398, which mentions a villa in Melarsio (now Melara) bordering the uncultivated land of the Cattinara hospital. However, it is not entirely clear what type of structure this hospital was. Since 1984, Cattinara has also been home to the main city hospital.

Since 1983, the school of the district has also been located there: the Sandro Pertini School, which was later expanded to include the current Francesco Rismondo middle School. Today, there is a complex that includes the kindergarten and these two schools.

Cattinara boasts a long educational tradition, as the first primaary school was established in 1791. The first teachers were local clerics and chaplains, later teachers.

== Culture ==
=== Architecture ===
- Most Holy Trinity Church, built in 1783-1784; became parish church in 1892.

== Gallery ==
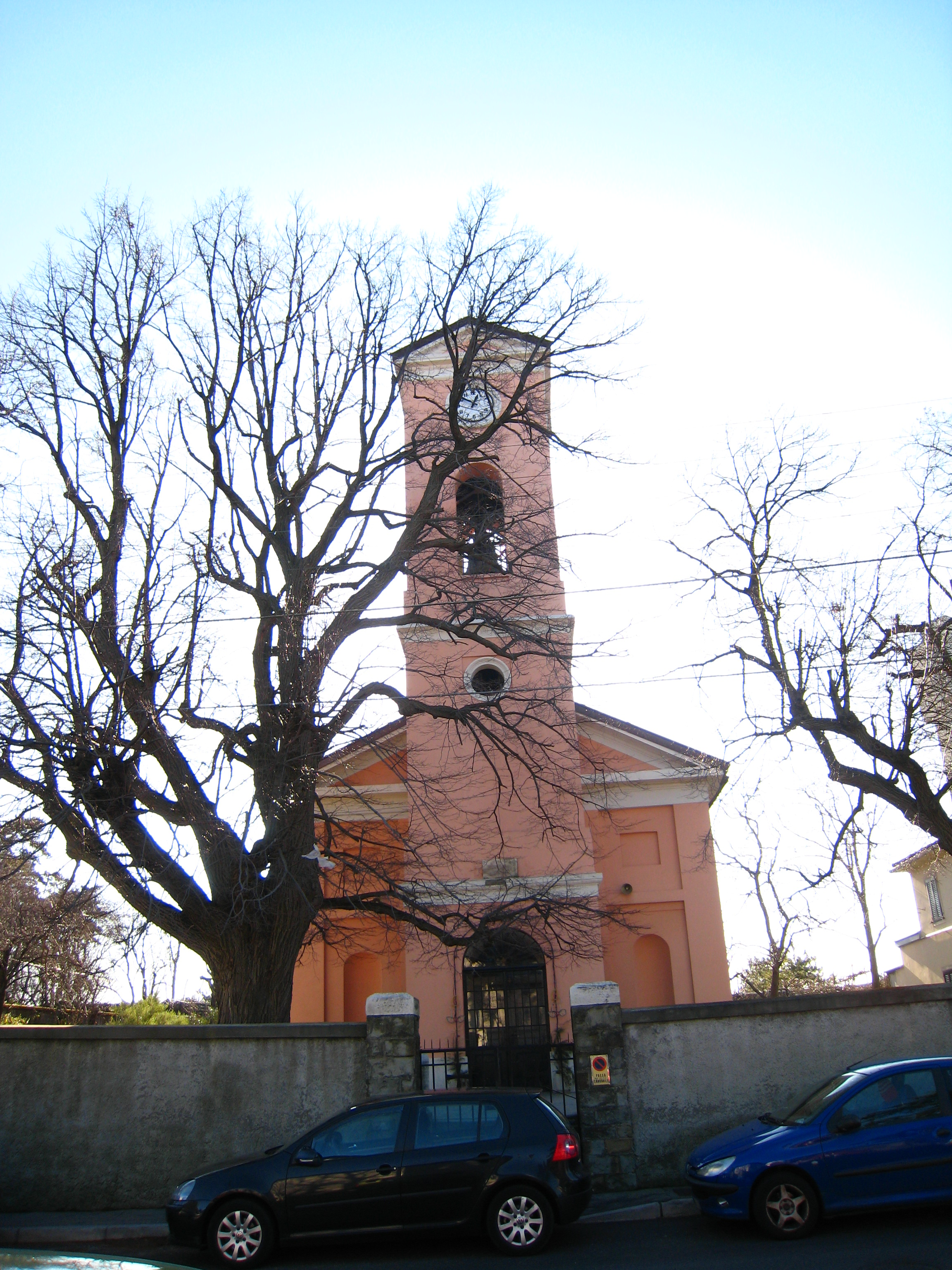
The parish church

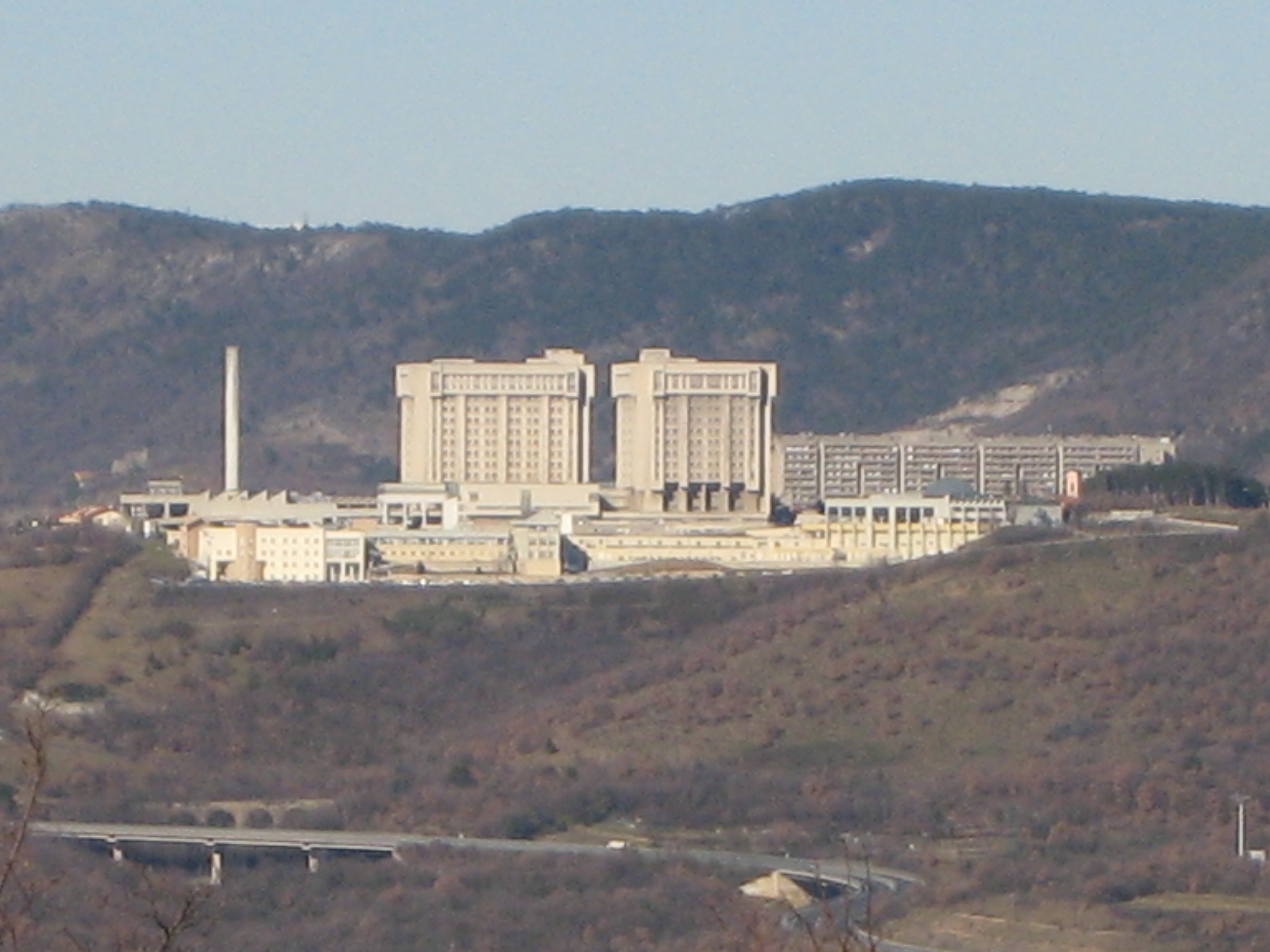
The hospital

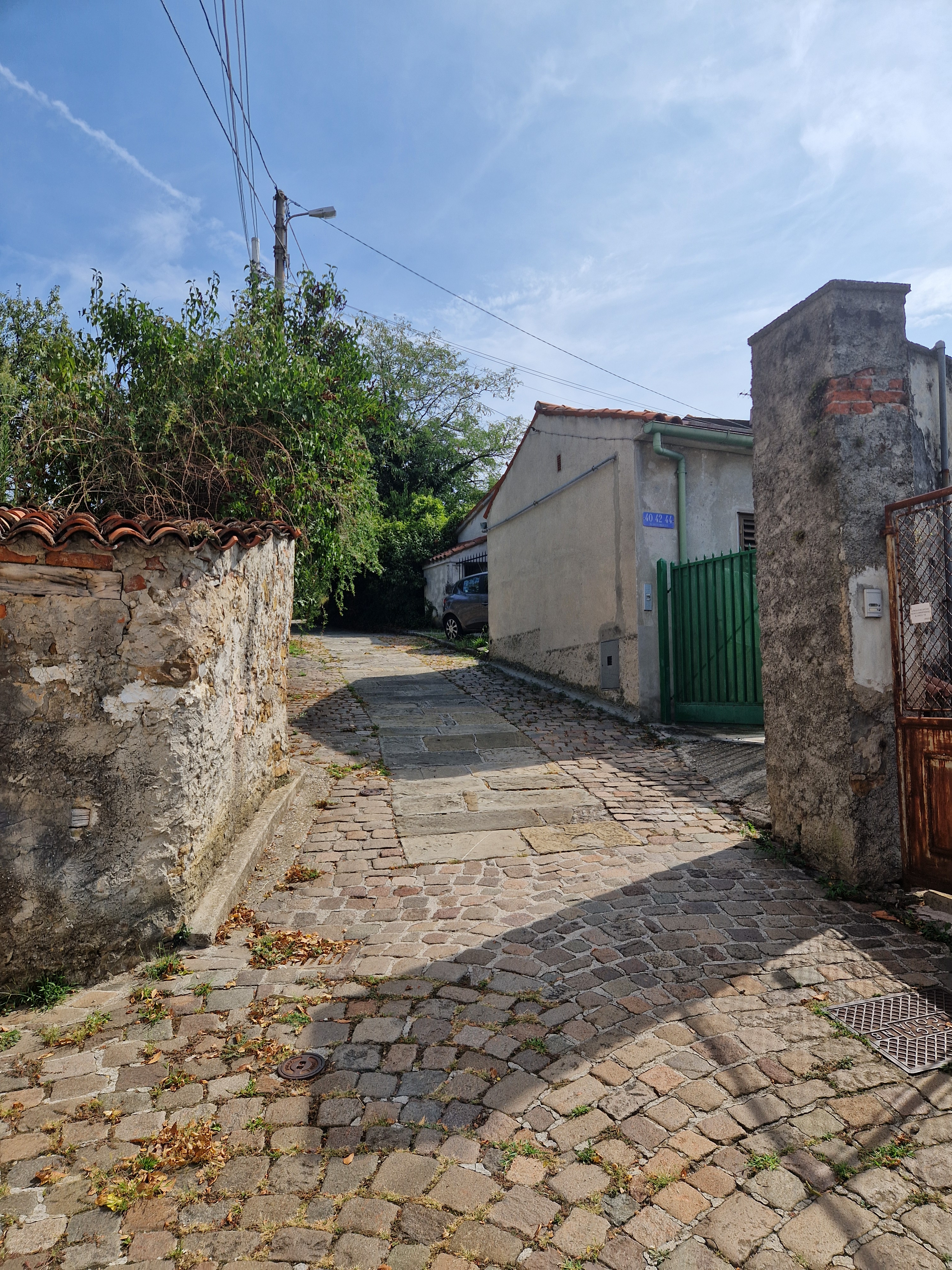
Padlock Street, which leads to the cemetery
