= Santissima Trinità, Cattinara =

Coordinates: 45.6425°N 13.8155°E

Most Holy Trinity Church
- Chiesa della Santissima Trinità a Cattinara
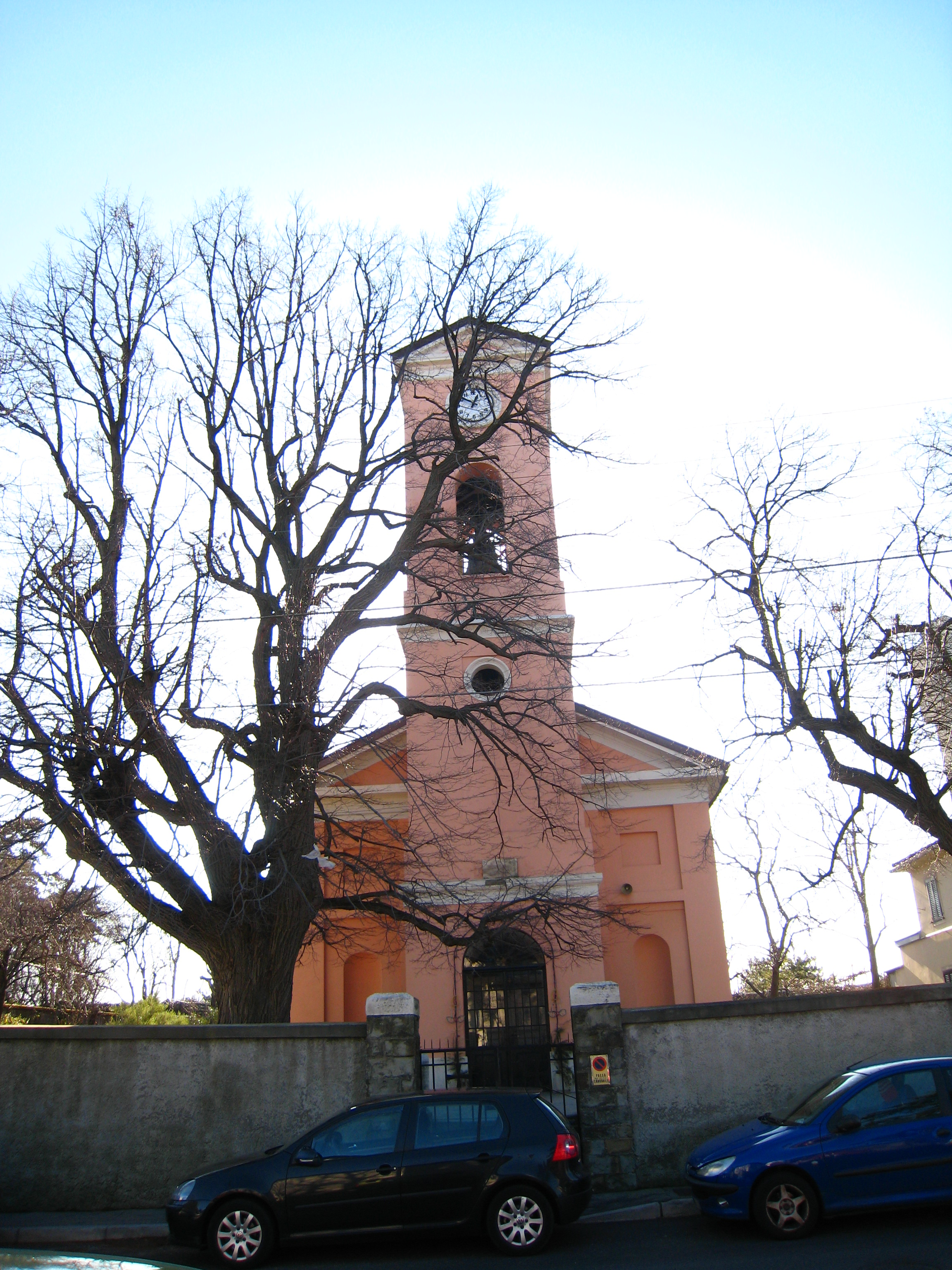
- Most Holy Trinity Church
- Location: Friuli-Venezia Giulia
- Country: Italy
- Denomination: Roman Catholic Church

The Most Holy Trinity Church (Italian: Chiesa della Santissima Trinità) is a Catholic church in Cattinara, a frazione of Trieste, Italy. It is located at the east east of the city. It is part of the deanery of Opicina.

== History ==
The first record of a church in Cattinara dates back to 1685, in a will. This chapel was deconsecrated in 1797 and converted into a granary. The current parish church was built between 1783 and 1784. It was consecrated on May 25, 1800. In 1892, the parish of the Holy Trinity of Cattinara was established.

=== External ===
The bell tower, leaning against the facade, was built during the two years 1883-1884.

== See also ==
- Roman Catholicism in Italy
- Most Holy Trinity Church
