= 28th Division (Yugoslav Partisans) =

28th Slavonia Division
- Flag of Democratic Federal Yugoslavia (used by the Partisans)
- Active: 1943–1945
- Country: Democratic Federal Yugoslavia
- Branch: Yugoslav Partisan Army
- Type: Infantry
- Size: Division
- Part of: Partisan 6th Corps; Partisan 2nd Army
- Engagements: World War II in Yugoslavia

The 28th Slavonia Division (Serbo-Croatian Latin: Dvadesetosma slavonska divizija) was a Yugoslav Partisan division that fought against the Germans, Independent State of Croatia (NDH) and Chetniks in occupied Yugoslavia during World War II.

It was formed in May 1943 on Papuk mountain near Požega in Slavonia. It fought briefly against the 13th Waffen Mountain Division of the SS Handschar (1st Croatian) in eastern Bosnia in late 1944.
