= Kerestinec concentration camp =

Prison made infamous in two wars

Logor Kerestinec
- Concentration camp
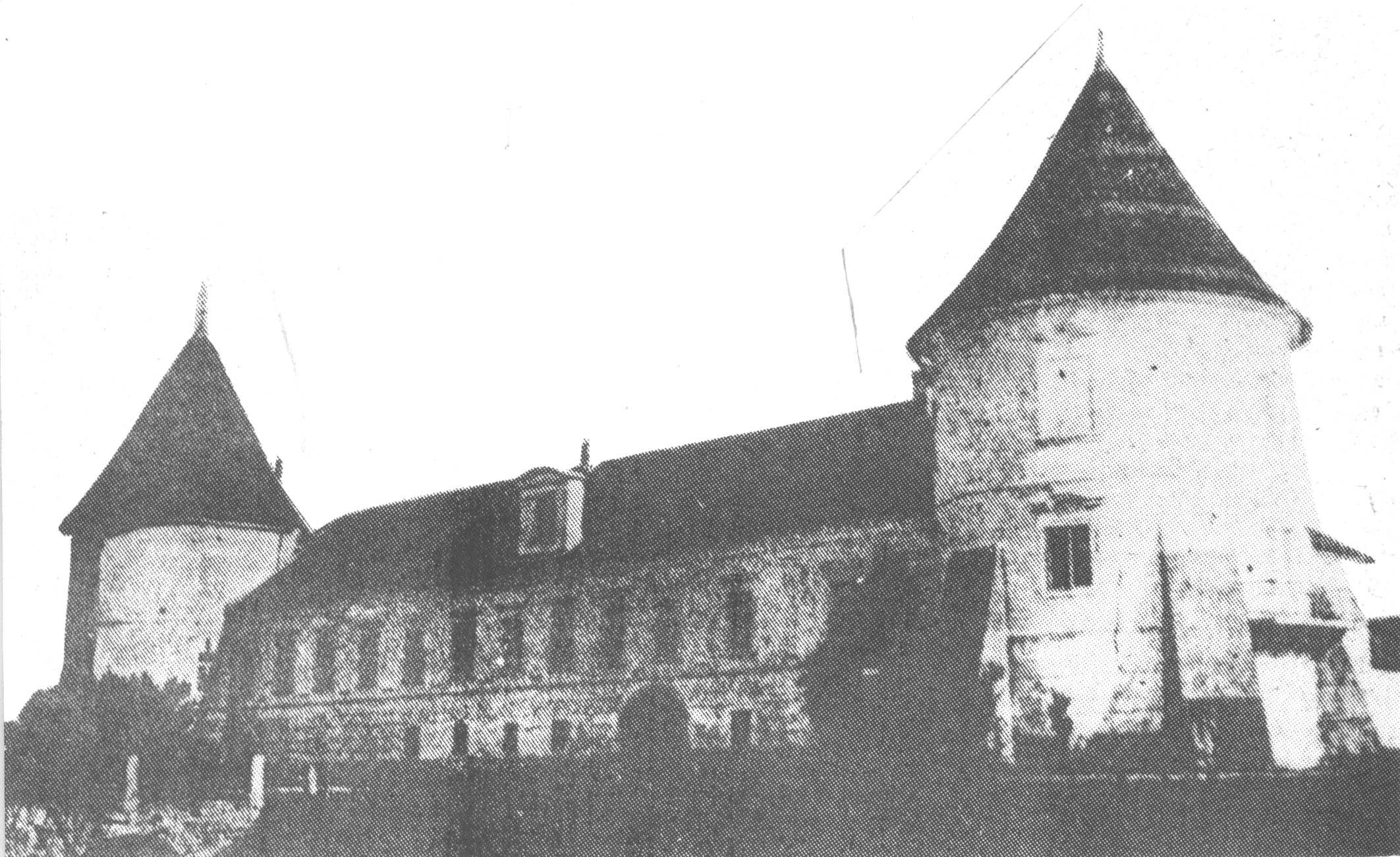
- Kerestinec castle during World War II
- Location: Kerestinec, Independent State of Croatia (present-day Croatia)
- Operational: 31 March – 14 July 1941
- Notable inmates: August Cesarec, Božidar Adžija, Otokar Keršovani and Ognjen Prica

Kerestinec concentration camp was a prison that served as a concentration camp in Kerestinec, Independent State of Croatia during World War II. It was located in the Erdödy castle overlooking the village.

== Early 20th century ==
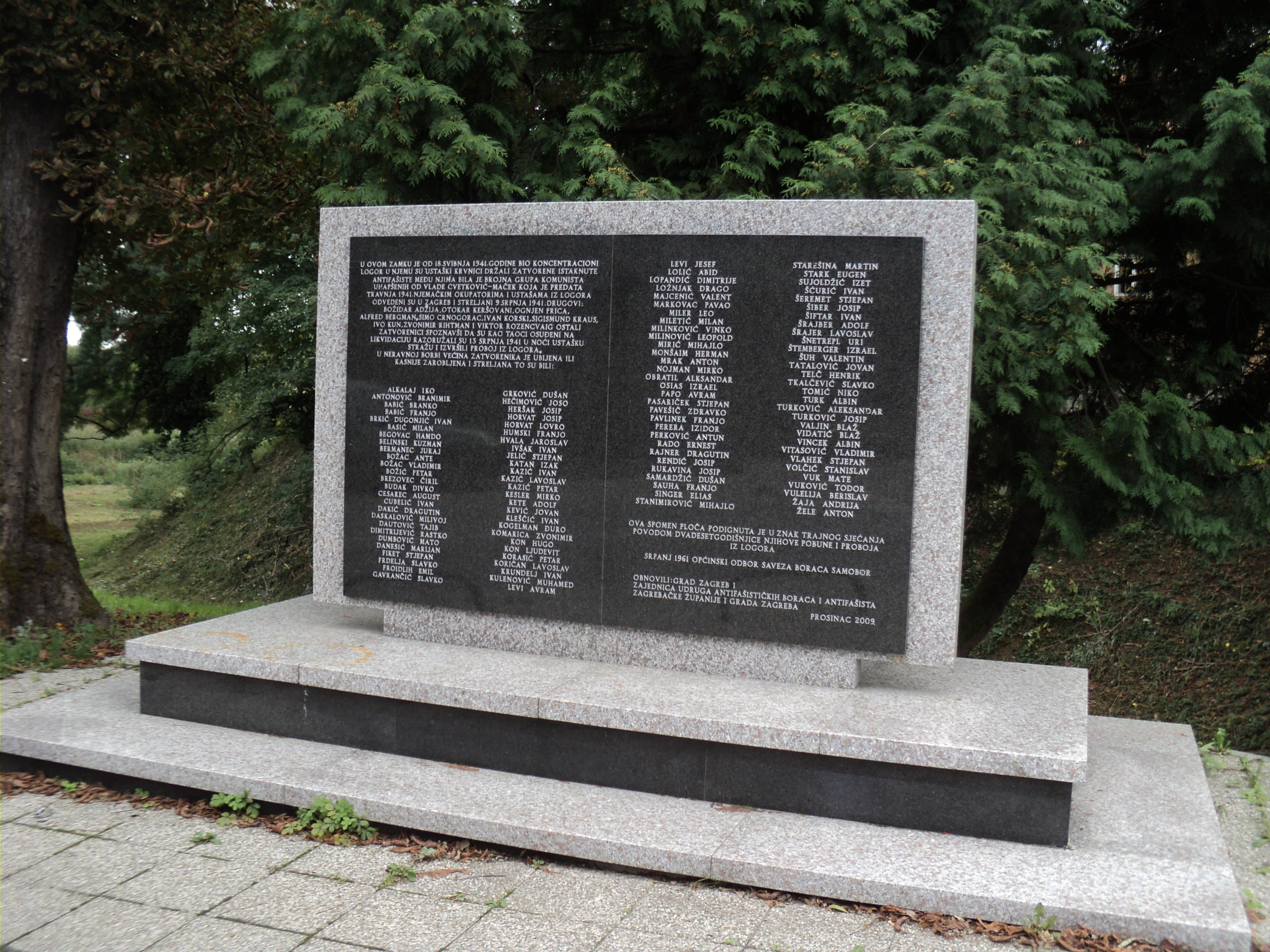
Memorial in front of the castle, dedicated to the camp victims killed by the Ustasha in 1941.

Before the outbreak of World War II, the government of the Kingdom of Yugoslavia built a prison near Kerestinec and used it to detain political prisoners. In March 1941, at the eve of the Axis invasion, a large number of left-wing intellectuals from Zagreb were arrested and interned in Kerestinec.

A few weeks later Yugoslavia collapsed and on April 19, 1941, the prison was taken over by authorities of the newly formed Independent State of Croatia. Prisoners were segregated based on ethnicity, with the camp split into "Serbian-Yugoslav", "Jewish" and "Communist" sections. Following German invasion of USSR, the Yugoslav Communist Party started a resistance movement that would become known as the Partisans. The Ustaša regime decided to retaliate by killing some of Kerestinec prisoners.

On 9 July 1941, the first group, including Božidar Adžija, Otokar Keršovani and Ognjen Prica, was executed. The Communist Party reacted by organizing an impromptu prison break. On 13 July, the guards were overpowered and all the remaining prisoners managed to escape. But the attempt soon proved to be poorly organised and uncoordinated. Very quickly, most of the prisoners, including August Cesarec, were recaptured and shot in Maksimir and Dotrščina woods.

== Late 20th century ==
The former Yugoslav Army (JNA) rocket base at Kerestinec was taken by the Croatian Army in 1991.

The base was used from November 1991 to May 1992 as a prison camp that housed JNA soldiers, Serb volunteers, mainly from Sisak, and civilians, including women during the Croatian War of Independence. The prison commander, Stjepan Klaric, took part in and encouraged his four colleagues and members of the Croatian Army, to use physical and psychological torture against the prisoners. A total of 34 people were involved and implicated in having inflicted great suffering and violation of bodily integrity and health, including daily harassment, assaults and rapes.

The five men were went on trial, charged with the physical and psychological torture of 34 detainees, and the sexual abuse of male and female prisoners from December 1991 until May 25, 1992. In 2012, Klaric was sentenced to three and a half years in prison while former guard Viktor Ivancin received two years and Drazen Pavlovic, Zeljko Zivec and Goran Strukelj one year in prison. The sentencing was overturned by the supreme court of Croatia in April 2014 and a new trial was ordered. The retrial ended in tougher sentences, with Klarić sentenced to eight years in prison and his subordinates, Ivancin, Pavlovic, Strukelj and Zivec, to five, three, two and a year and a half in prison respectively.
