= St. Roch Chapel, Sveta Nedelja =

Chapel in Sveta Nedelja, Zagreb County, Croatia

Coordinates: 45°47′45″N 15°46′37″E

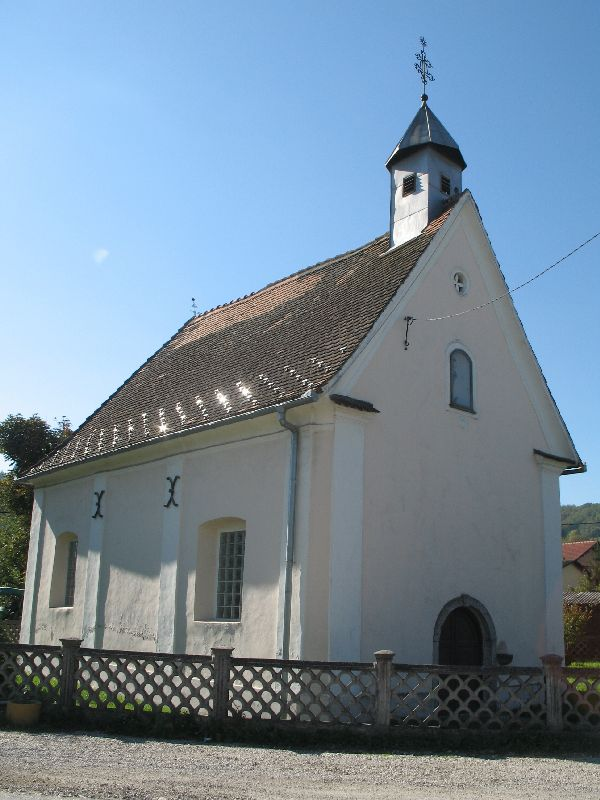
St. Roch Chapel

The Chapel of St. Roch stands in Sveta Nedelja, Croatia and was first mentioned in 1668.

It is a valuable example of a harmonious Baroque structure with a rectangular layout and rectangular sanctuary and small bell tower from 1927 that stands above the facade. All the facades of the chapel are ornamented with shallow white fluting and a simply profiled final frieze.

The greatest value of the chapel is the impressive and restored Baroque altar of St. Roch from 1751, covering the entire wall of the sanctuary. The pulpit and organ, constructed by famous Slovene builder Anton Scholz, are also very valuable.

== Organs ==
The organ in the Chapel of St. Roch is a historical organ from 1799, with 7 registers, one manual and without a pedal, and is the work of Celje master builder Anton Scholz. It is a mechanical system, with a slider chest. The magnificently carved curtains over the pipe openings are deserving of special attention.

This is one of the rare organs of this type in Croatia, and in 2012, it was completely restored in the Heferer workshop.

== See also ==
- Church of the Most Holy Trinity, Sveta Nedelja
- Old parish house "Crkvenjak"
- Sveta Nedelja
- Zagreb County
