= Church of the Most Holy Trinity, Sveta Nedelja =

Church of the Most Holy Trinity (Croatian: Crkva Presvetog Trojstva)
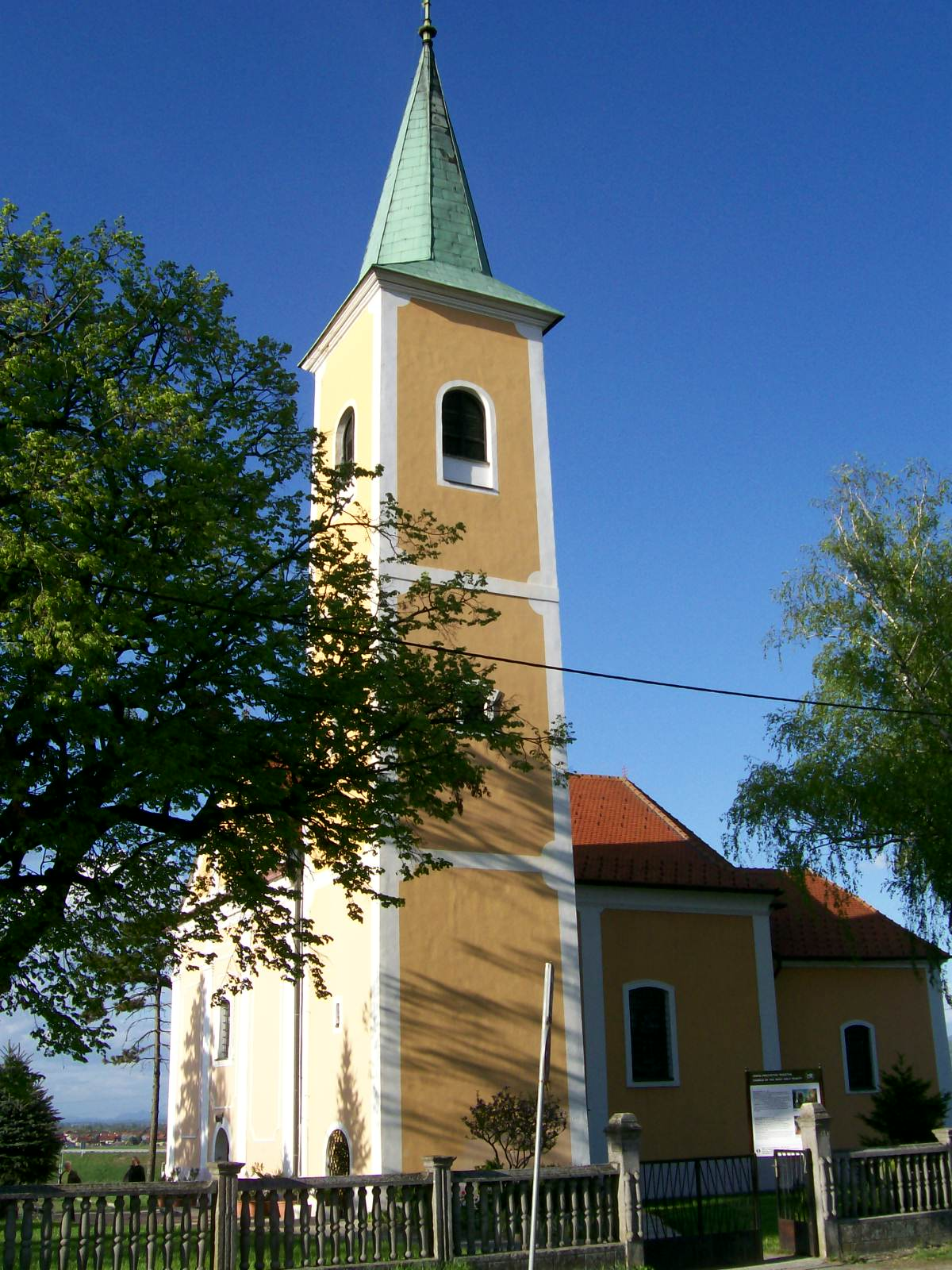
- Location: Sveta Nedelja
- Country: Croatia
- Denomination: Roman Catholic

History
- Status: Parish church

Architecture
- Functional status: Active
- Style: Baroque
- Completed: 1786

Administration
- Diocese: Zagreb
- Deanery: Sveta Nedelja
- Parish: Most Holy Trinity

Clergy
- Archbishop: Josip Bozanić
- Priest: Marijan Kušenić

The parish Church of the Most Holy Trinity in Sveta Nedelja, Zagreb County, Croatia was constructed from 1768 to 1786. It is an important example of a late Baroque type of church.

It is a single nave structure, with a rectangular layout and apsidal peak, with a side bell tower off the main facade. It is covered with a dome, and its interior walls are richly ornamented. The significant inventory includes the main altar from 1811, the side altar with the statue of Our Lady of Sorrows, made of stone in the 17th century, the pulpit and organ from 1900. From 1608 to 1783, the Chapel of St. Peter, housing the tomb of the Erdödy family, stood next to the church. The church was initially a Gothic structure, that was damaged over time. It was restored in the Baroque style.

The parish of the Most Holy Trinity was first mentioned in 1334, and was included in the list of parishes of the Zagreb Archdiocese since 1501. One of the prominent people from Sveta Nedelja was the parish priest, Mihalj Šilobod Bolšić, who served in Sveta Nedelja from 1760 to 1787, and is known as the creator of the first Croatian arithmetic book (Arithmetika Horvatszka), issued in Zagreb in 1758, in the Kajkavian dialect.

== Old legend ==
Legend has it that the Sava river once flooded over and flowed through Sveta Nedelja, and when it retreated into the lake under the hill, they found the statue of the Holy Trinity, which the interpreted as the voice of God, telling them to build a church at that spot, and to house the statue within.

== See also ==
- St. Rocco Chapel, Sveta Nedelja
- Old parish house "Crkvenjak"
- Sveta Nedelja
- Zagreb County
