= Rakov Potok =

Coordinates: 45°44′N 15°48′E

- Village
- Interactive map of Rakov Potok
- Country: Croatia
- County: Zagreb County

Area
  - Total: 2.6 sq mi (6.8 km^{2})

Population (2021)
  - Total: 1,089
  - Density: 410/sq mi (160/km^{2})
- Time zone: UTC+1 (CET)
  - Summer (DST): UTC+2 (CEST)

Rakov Potok is a village in Croatia. It is connected by the D1 highway.

The area is known to have several mass graves from World War II. In 2011, it emerged that the area likely contained the remains of the last government of the Independent State of Croatia executed in 1945.
