= Ognjen Prica =

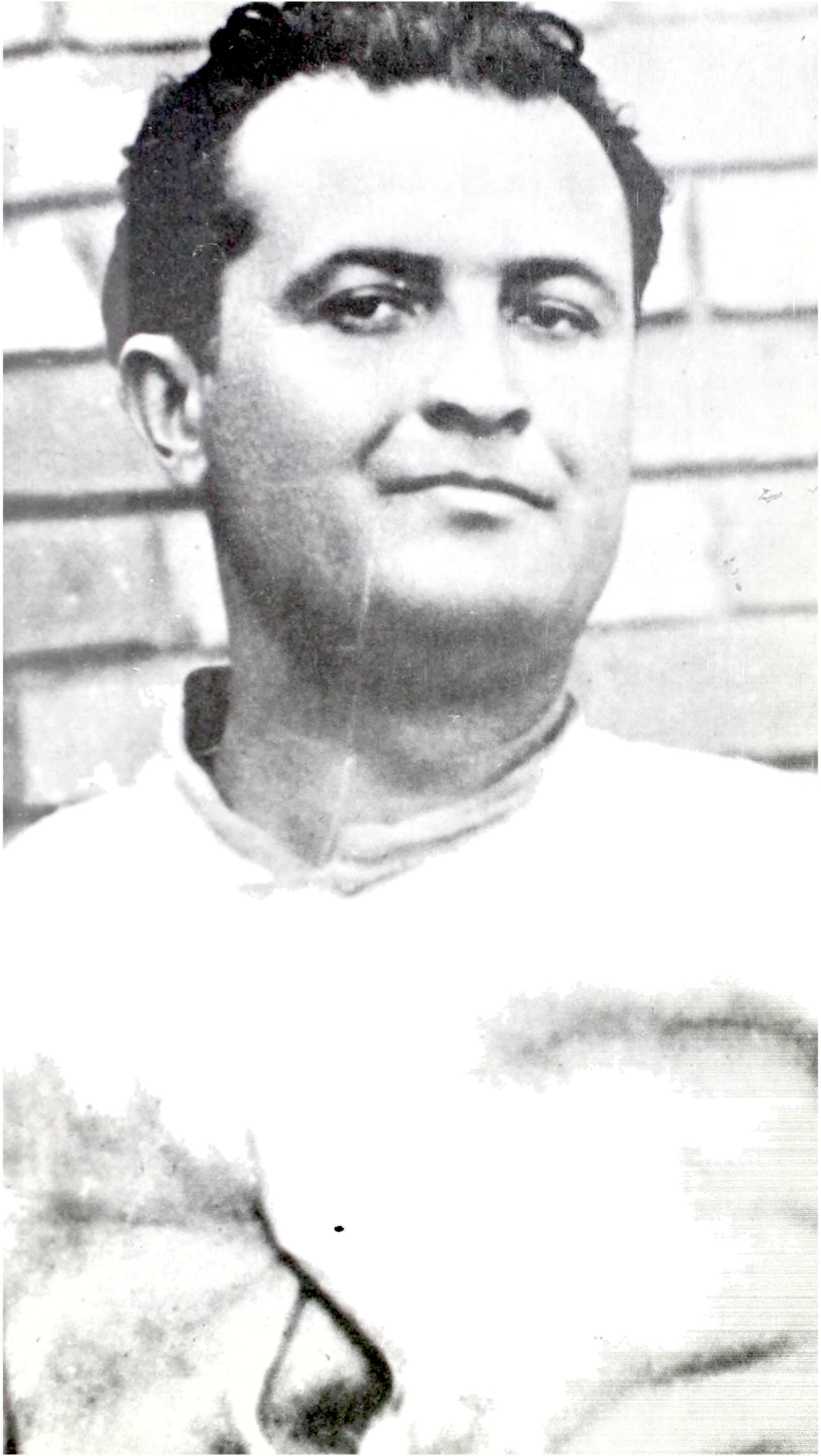
- Born: 27 November 1899; Ilidža, Bosnia and Herzegovina, Austria-Hungary
- Died: 9 July 1941 (aged 41); Kerestinec, Independent State of Croatia
- Cause of death: Murdered by the Ustaše
- Education: University of Zagreb
- Occupations: University professor, journalist
- Awards: Order of the People's Hero

Ognjen Prica (27 November 1899 – 9 July 1941) was a Bosnian and Yugoslav communist politician and journalist known for his roles in the League of Communist Youth of Yugoslavia and the League of Communists of Croatia. He was a victim of the Nazi-backed NDH in 1941 and was posthumously awarded the Order of the People's Hero.

== Biography ==
Born in Ilidža, a suburb of Sarajevo in Austria-Hungary (present day Bosnia and Herzegovina) on 27 November 1899, Prica became interested in politics while studying mathematics and physics at the University of Zagreb. In 1921, he became the member of the League of Communists of Yugoslavia and was one of the founders of the League of Communist Youth of Yugoslavia. From 1921 until 1923, Prica lived in Vienna, where he finished his studies and worked in the Bureau of the Communist Balkan Federation. Upon returning to Yugoslavia, he worked as a teacher in Sarajevo, but was also active in Communist politics.

Because of that, Prica was arrested and sentenced to seven years in prison. In prison and afterwards, he translated classic Marxist books to Serbo-Croatian. After his release in 1937, Prica became one of the leading members of the newly formed League of Communists of Croatia. In March 1941, a few days before the Axis invasion of Yugoslavia, he was arrested together with a large number of Croatian left-wing intellectuals and was sent to Kerestinec camp, where Prica was handed over to the Ustaše authorities a few weeks later. He was shot as a retaliation for Partisan activity together with Zvonimir Richtmann, Božidar Adžija and Otokar Keršovani.

After the war, Prica was posthumously awarded the Order of the People's Hero on 26 July 1945.

== Orders ==
- Order of the People's Hero: 26 July 1945
