= Kerestinec =

- Location within Croatia
- Coordinates: 45°46′N 15°48′E
- Country: Croatia
- County: Zagreb County
- City: Sveta Nedelja

Area
  - Total: 4.9 km^{2} (1.9 sq mi)

Population (2021)
  - Total: 1,489
  - Density: 300/km^{2} (790/sq mi)
- Time zone: UTC+1 (CET)
  - Summer (DST): UTC+2 (CEST)

Kerestinec is a village (naselje) west of Zagreb, in the Sveta Nedelja, Zagreb County municipality, infamous for events in Croatian history. It has 1,433 inhabitants living on an area of 4.71 square kilometers (1.82 sq mi).

== History ==
The name of Kerestinec comes from Hungarian word kereszt which stands for "cross".

According to historical sources, there was a wooden chapel of Holy Cross near the Erdödy castle, Kerestinec. Since the Erdődys were a Croatian-Hungarian noble family, a lot of Hungarian words were used in that time, and this is why Kerestinec bears such a name.

On 6 February 1573, during the Croatian and Slovenian peasant revolt, government forces led by podban (deputy viceroy) of Croatia, Gašpar Alapić, defeated rebels in a battle near Kerestinec.

The Kerestinec prison gained infamy during World War II and then again during the Yugoslav Wars.

== Today ==
Today, Kerestinec is one of the settlements of the town of Sveta Nedelja. Local buildings of note are the Erdödy castle and the parish church of the Holy Cross.

In terms of economy, Kerestinec is also the seat of several companies and numerous private enterprises.

Kerestinec is also the cultural center of Sveta Nedelja. The leader of cultural development is the local Cultural society Kerestinec. Other groups are the Sport-fishing club "Som", "TOP" Kerestinec Football club, Volunteer Fire Department Kerestinec and several other unions.
