= Otokar Keršovani =

Croatian journalist

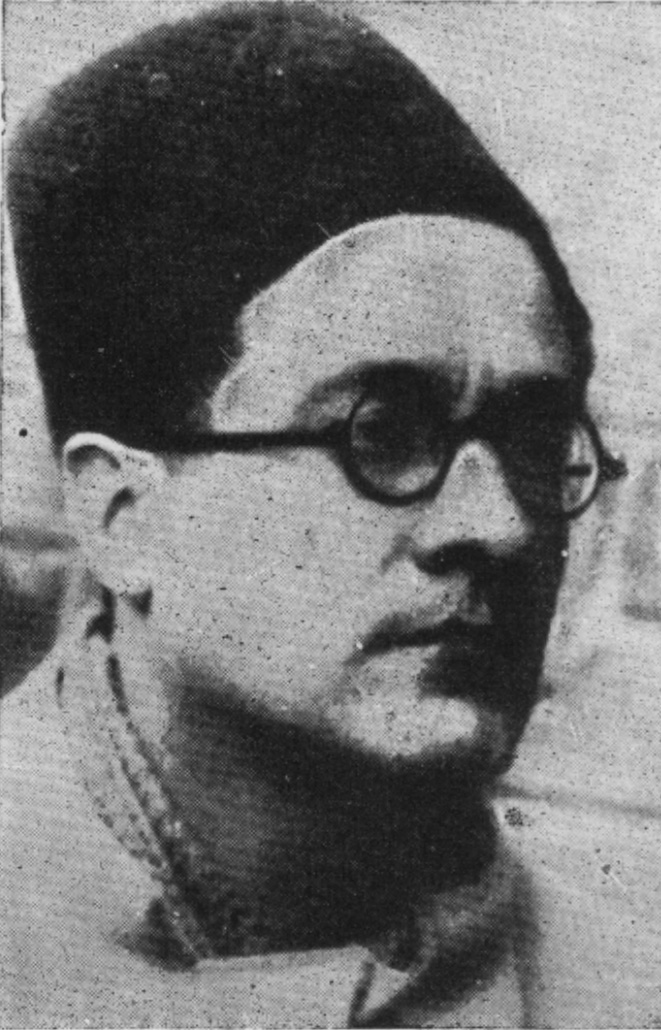
Otokar Keršovani

Otokar Keršovani (23 February 1902 – 9 July 1941) was a Croatian and Yugoslav journalist, literary critic, publicist and communist politician.

He was born in Trieste, which was part of Austria-Hungary at the time. The collapse of the Habsburg Empire caught him in the Istrian town of Pazin, which was soon occupied by Italian forces and its Croatian school closed. Because of that Keršovani emigrated to Yugoslavia and began to study forest management at the University of Zagreb.

In 1924, he became a full-time journalist, working for Zagreb Press Bureau and contributing to the Zagreb daily Novosti. At the same time, he also began to associate himself with Communism and he formally became a member of the Communist Party of Yugoslavia. In 1928, he was arrested and spent a year in prison. Upon his release he went to Serbia where he tried to organise local branches of SKOJ. In 1930, he was arrested once more and sentenced to ten years of prison, after admitting his Party membership to the court.

He served his sentence in Sremska Mitrovica prison, where he remained politically active. He served as Marxist ideology teacher for other incarcerated Communists. He also tutored other inmates in journalism and founded the prison newspaper Udarnik. He was released in February 1940 and continued to work in various left-wing magazines.

In March 1941, at the very eve of the Axis invasion of Yugoslavia, he was arrested and put in Kerestinec prison. During his stay in prison he was visited by Božo Cerovski, an Ustaše commissioner for internal affairs and security of Croatia whom he knew from prison in Lepoglava where both of them served their sentence. The Ustasha regime had him shot together with Zvonimir Richtmann, Božidar Adžija and Ognjen Prica as retaliation for Partisan activities.

After the war, a publishing company in Opatija, as well as the Lifetime Achievement Award by the Croatian Journalists' Association, were named after him.

== Notes and references ==
- Iveković, Mladen, Hrvatska lijeva inteligencija 1918-1945, Zagreb, Naprijed, 1970.
- Keršovani, Otokar at lzmk.hr (in Croatian)
