= Božidar Adžija =

Yugoslav politician

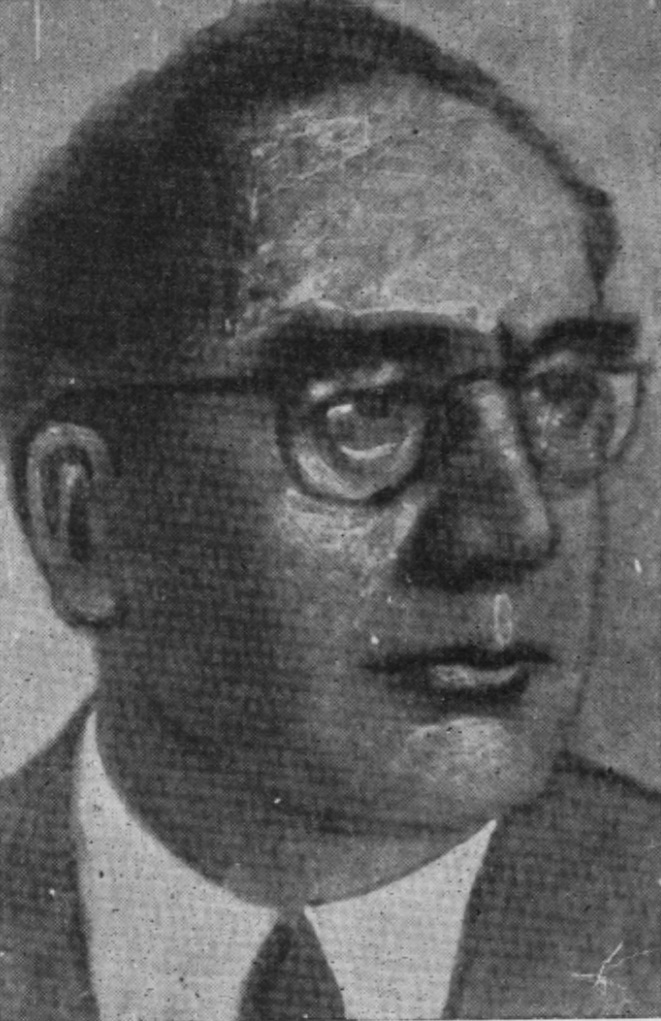
Božidar Adžija

Božidar Adžija (Serbian Cyrillic: Божидар Аџија; 24 December 1890 – 9 July 1941) was a Croatian communist politician and publicist.

== Biography ==
A native of Drniš in the Kingdom of Dalmatia (present-day Croatia), of Croat and Serb descent, Adžija participated in World War I as a soldier in the Austro-Hungarian Army. Prior to that, he went to Prague to study law, completing his doctorate in 1914.

After the war and collapse of Austria-Hungary, in 1919 he became labour policy commissioner in the local Zagreb government. As an avid Social Democrat, he was a member of various left-wing and Marxist parties and wrote many articles about labour and social issues. His views gradually shifted towards Communism, and in 1934 he joined the Communist Party of Yugoslavia. Because of that, he was often arrested, the last such occasion being in March 1941, only days before the Axis invasion of Yugoslavia.

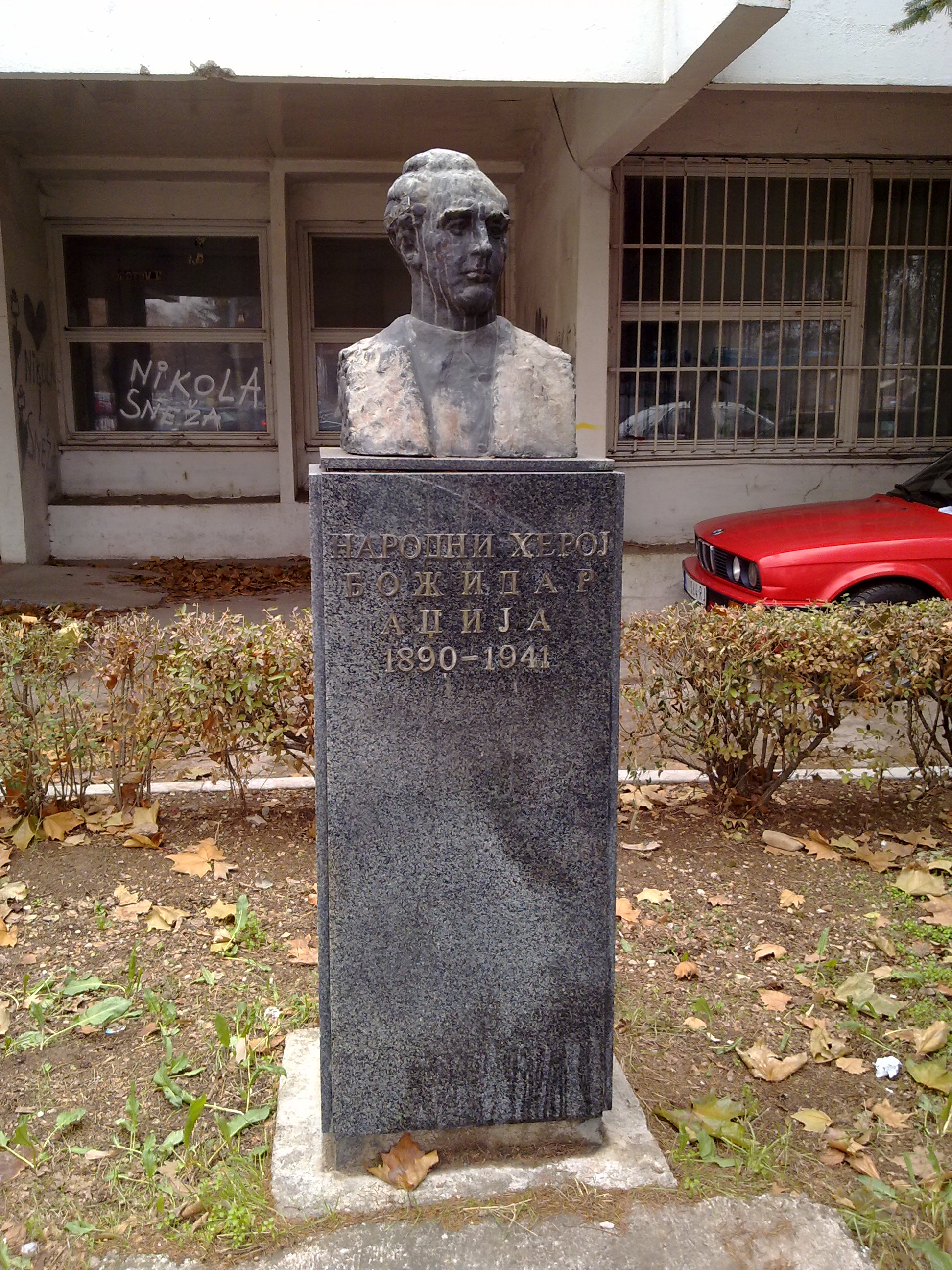
Bust of Božidar Adžija in Niš

When Yugoslavia collapsed and the Nazi puppet state of the Independent State of Croatia was established a few weeks later, Adžija was kept in the Kerestinec prison together with many other members of the Croatian left-wing intelligentsia. The Ustaša authorities had Adžija shot — together with Zvonimir Richtmann, Otokar Keršovani, and Ognjen Prica — as a retaliation for Partisan activity. Adžija posthumously received the title of People's Hero of Yugoslavia.
