= List of mass executions and massacres in Yugoslavia during World War II =

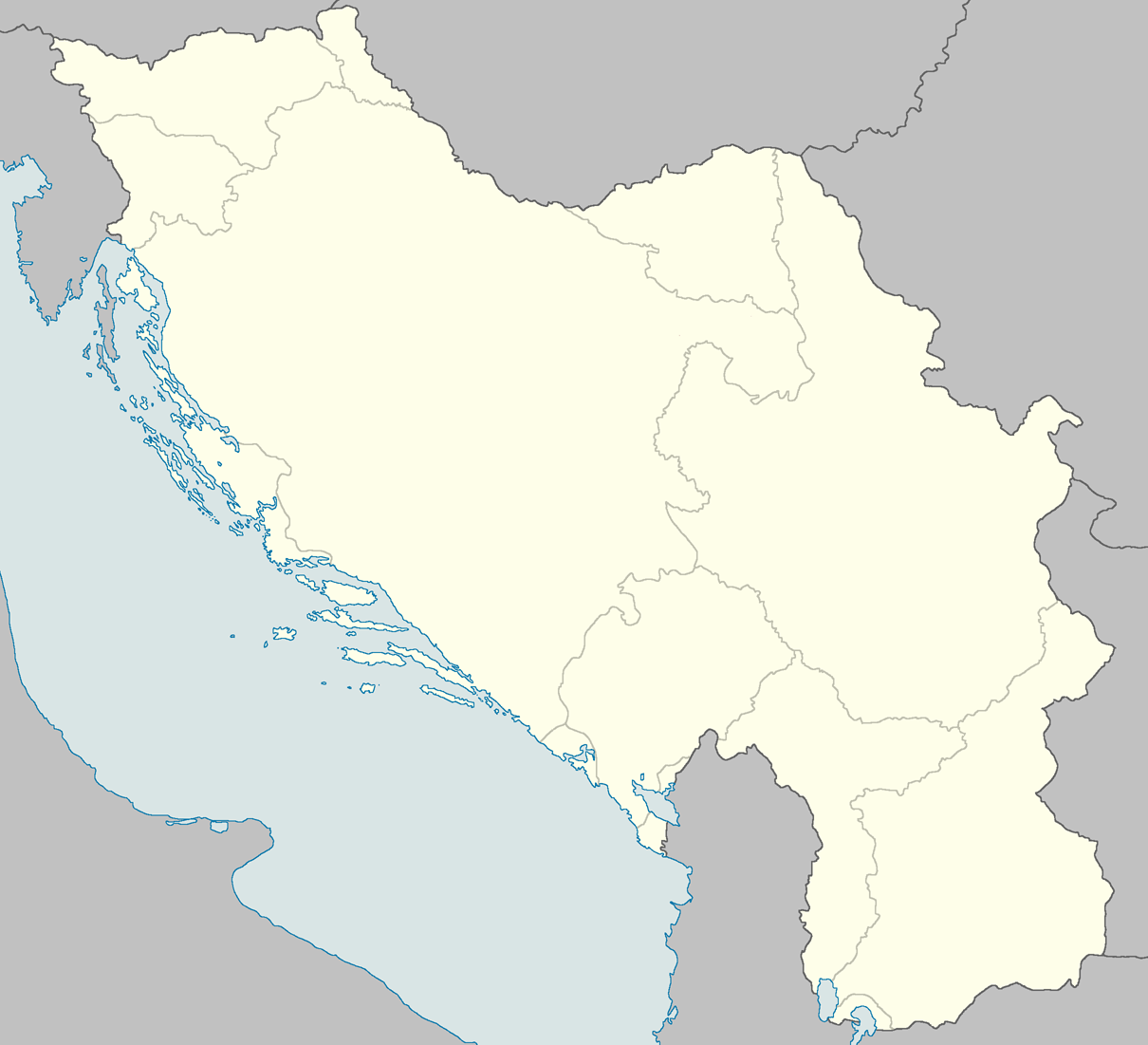
Map of areas where massacres were committed by Chetniks (red), by the Ustaše (blue), by both Chetniks and the Ustaše (purple), by German forces (Wehrmacht, SS or Gestapo) (black), by Hungarian forces (green), by the Partisans (orange), by Italian forces (cyan/light blue) and by both Chetniks and Italian forces (pink). Larger marker sizes indicate larger massacres.

The following is a list of massacres and mass executions that occurred in Yugoslavia during World War II. Areas once part of Yugoslavia that are now parts of Bosnia and Herzegovina, Croatia, Kosovo, Serbia, Slovenia, North Macedonia, and Montenegro; see the lists of massacres in those countries for more details.

== Perpetrators ==
The majority of massacres were committed by Yugoslav factions during the civil war, while a number were committed by invading Axis forces.

=== Ustaše ===
After the invasion of Yugoslavia, puppet-state Independent State of Croatia (NDH) was created by Axis powers in the areas of most of modern-day Croatia and Bosnia and Herzegovina. The Ustaše sought to create an ethnically clean state by eradicating Serbs, Jews and Romani through genocidal policies. According to Ustaše officials, the creation of an ethnically pure Greater Croatian state would ensure the safety of the Croats from the Serbs. From the data calculated by the German Ministry of Foreign Affairs, during the creation of the state the population of Serbs was approximately 1,925,000. The Ustaše's largest genocidal massacres were carried out in Bosanska Krajina and in places in Croatia where Serbs constituted a large proportion of the population including Banija, Kordun, Lika, and northern Dalmatia. Between 300 000– 350 000 Serbs were killed in massacres and in concentration camps like Jasenovac and Jadovno. Some 100,000 Serbs, Jews, and anti-fascist Croat were killed at Jasenovac alone.

=== Chetniks ===
The Chetniks wanted to forge an ethnically pure Greater Serbia claiming it was to ensure the survival of Serbs in Axis/Ustaše-controlled areas by violently "cleansing" these areas of Croats and Muslims. Several historians view Chetnik actions against Muslim and Croats as constituting genocide. Estimates of the number of deaths caused by the Chetniks in Croatia and Bosnia and Herzegovina range from 50,000 to 68,000, while more than 5,000 victims are registered in the region of Sandžak. About 300 villages and small towns were destroyed, along with a large number of mosques and Catholic churches. Chetnik massacres of the Bosniak population took place in eastern Bosnia which, according to historian Marko Attila Hoare, had been "relatively untouched" by the Ustaše until the spring of 1942. Bosnian historian Enver Redžić has a different opinion and claims that eastern Bosnia was not in relative peace at all during the period 1941–1942. He writes that in the summer of 1941, killings of Serbs had already started and acquired broader proportions in eastern Bosnia and that anti-Serb propaganda by Ustaše, by that time, had success among local Muslim and Croats. Bosniak Muslims, particularly in Eastern Bosnia, comprised a large contingent of Ustashe units in the region and played a large role in the genocide of ethnic Serbs in the area that began in 1941. Bosniaks, later in the war, also joined the Waffen SS units that were notorious for their cruelty to the Serbian population. The Serbian population in the Podrina region (Eastern Bosnia) declined significantly as a result of these massacres and ethnic cleansing. Hoare argues that the latter-referenced massacres were not acts of revenge, but "an expression of the genocidal policy and ideology of the Chetnik movement."

=== Yugoslav Partisans ===
Yugoslav Partisans committed various massacres, notably as part of the so-called "leftist errors" against ideological opponents and suspected collaborators. At the end of the war, the Partisans "purged" in Serbia (1944–45), and massacred tens of thousands of suspected collaborators during the Bleiburg repatriations at the end and immediate aftermath of the war. Ethnic minorities, such as Italians (namely Istrian Italians and Dalmatian Italians), were persecuted during the Foibe massacres in Julian March, Kvarner and Dalmatia, while ethnic Germans were also massacred during the Flight and expulsion of Germans in Yugoslavia.

=== Axis occupying forces ===
German, Italian, Hungarian and Bulgarian occupying forces engaged in atrocities against the Yugoslavian population, in the form of mass-killings of civilians and hostages in retaliation for Partisan attacks and resistance. Infamous examples include the Kragujevac massacre, committed by German forces, as did the Albanian Waffen-SS units, which murdered more than 400 Orthodox Christian civilians at Andrijevica, the Novi Sad raid, committed by Hungarian forces and crimes committed by Italian forces, such as in Podhum.

== List ==
Name	Date	Location	Deaths	Perpetrator(s)	Description
Alibunar and Selište massacre	April 1941	Alibunar and Selište	254	Nazi Germany	Massacre of Royal Yugoslav Army POWs and civilians by the 2nd SS Panzer Division in Alibunar and the nearby settlement of Selište.
Sušica massacre	April 1941	Sušica, North Macedonia	7	(Tsardom of Bulgaria (1908–1946)) Kingdom of Bulgaria	Seven Turkish civilians were executed. The victims' houses were burned down and some women were raped.
Donji Mosti massacre	10 April 1941	Donji Mosti	11	Kingdom of Yugoslavia	Croat civilians killed by the cavalry regiment "Car Dušan Silni" of the Royal Yugoslav Army in response to a Croat fifth column insurrection in Bjelovar.
Derventa massacre	11–13 April 1941	Derventa	17	Kingdom of Yugoslavia	Croat civilians killed by retreating Royal Yugoslav Army soldiers.
Bačka massacre	14 April 1941	Bačka region	500	Kingdom of Hungary	Massacre of Serbs and Jews across various areas of Bačka by Hungarian forces.
Slavonska Požega executions	19–23 April 1941	Slavonska Požega	38	Ustaše	Executions of Serbs by Ustaše.
Celje executions	1941–1945	Celje	374	Nazi Germany	Mass-executions of Slovene hostages by German forces throughout occupation of Celje.
Kacenštajn executions	1941–1945	Kacenštajn Castle, Begunje na Gorenjskem	849	Nazi Germany	Mass-executions of Slovene hostages by the Gestapo throughout World War II.
Dotrščina executions	1941–1945	Dotrščina, Zagreb	7,000	Ustaše	Mass-executions of Serbs, Jews, Roma and Croat Anti-fascist hostages (including 2,000 members of the KPJ and the SKOJ) during the Ustaše occupation of Zagreb. About 90% (c. 6,300) of those executed were Croat civilians and Anti-fascists, due to the fact that most of Zagreb's Serbian, Jewish and Roma populations had either been killed or deported to Jasenovac or Auschwitz by 1942.
Mijajlova Jama massacres	1941–1945	Mijajlova Jama, near Ravna Reka	1,000+	Chetniks	Chetniks, led by Mihailo Čačić, executed more than 1,000 people in killings throughout the occupation in the Mijajlova Jama (Mijail's pit). The victims included captured Partisans, local civilians accused of collaborating with Partisans, captured Allied pilots (Americans) and civilian prisoners of various nationalities (Russians, Greeks, Poles, Czechs, Italians) who had escaped from nearby German labour camps.
Pančevo executions	21–22 April 1941	Pančevo, Vojvodina	36	Nazi Germany	Execution of Serbs by Wehrmacht and Volksdeutsche.
Gudovac massacre	28 April 1941	Gudovac near Bjelovar, Croatia proper	184–196	Ustaše	Massacre of Serbs by Ustaše.
Kosinj massacre	30 April 1941	Kosinj, Lika	c. 600	Ustaše	Massacre of Serbs by Ustaše.
Dubrovnik executions	May–December 1941	Dubrovnik	58	Ustaše	Execution of captives, primarily Serbs, by subordinates under Ivo Rojnica including 13 who were killed on 1 July 1941.
Sanski Most executions	9 May 1941	Sanski Most	27	Nazi Germany	Shooting of Serbs by Germans following a revolt.
Blagaj massacre	9 May 1941	Blagaj, Croatia proper	c. 400	Ustaše	Massacre of Serbs from Veljun and surroundings by Ustaše.
Glina massacre	11–13 May 1941	Glina	260–417	Ustaše	Massacre of Serbs by Ustaše.
Otočac massacre	May 1941	Otočac	331	Ustaše	Massacre of Serbs by Ustaše.
Nevesinje massacre	late May–June 1941	Nevesinje, Herzegovina	173	Ustaše	Massacre of Serbs by Ustaše.
Doljani massacre	June 1941 – 1942	Doljani, Donji Lapac	1,186	Ustaše	Massacre of Serbs by Ustaše.
Gacko massacre	3 June 1941	Korita	133–180	Ustaše	Massacre of Serbs by Ustaše; corpses thrown into the Koritska Jama pit.
Knin massacre	15 June 1941	Knin	c. 60	Ustaše	Massacre of Serbs by Ustaše.
Rašića Gaj massacres	22 June–20 July 1941	Rašića Gaj, Vlasenica	70–200	Ustaše Muslim militia	Massacre of Serbs by Ustaše Muslim militia.
Popovo Polje massacre	23 June 1941	Popovo Polje, Ljubinje, Herzegovina	140-164	Ustaše	Massacre of Serbs by Ustaše in the villages of Popovo Polje in the district of Ljubinje.
Metković massacre	25 June 1941	Metković	280	Ustaše	Massacre of Serbs by Ustaše.
Dračevo massacre	25 June 1941	Dračevo	70	Ustaše	Massacre of Serbs by Ustaše.
Avtovac massacre	28 June 1941	Avtovac	47	Chetniks	Massacre of Muslims by Chetniks.
Bileća massacre	June 1941	Bileća, Herzegovina	c. 600	Serb rebels	Massacre of Muslims by Serb rebels.
Kostajnica massacre	29 June - July 1941	Hrvatska Kostajnica	280	Ustaše	Massacre of Serbs by Ustaše.
Ličko Petrovo Selo and Melinovac massacre	June - August 1941	Ličko Petrovo Selo and Melinovac	890	Ustaše	Massacre of Serbs by Ustaše.
Pecka massacre	July 1941	Pecka	250	Ustaše	Massacre of Serbs by Ustaše.
Perna massacre	July 1941 – 1942	Perna	427	Ustaše	Massacre of Serbs by Ustaše.
Rakovica massacre	July 1941 – 1942	Rakovica	2,019	Ustaše	Massacre of Serbs by Ustaše.
Vojnić massacre	July 1941 – 1942	Vojnić	3,849	Ustaše	Massacre of Serbs by Ustaše.
Čelebić massacre (1941)	July 1941	Čelebić	104	Ustaše	Massacre of Serbs by Ustaše.
Garavice massacre	July – September 1941	Garavice, near Bihac	10,000-12,000	Ustaše	Massacre of Serbs, Jews and Roma by Ustaše.
"Leftist error" massacres	July 1941 – early 1942	Mostly areas of Serbia, Montenegro and East Herzegovina	1,000+	Partisans	Partisan massacres of suspected enemy collaborators, political opponents, "class enemies" and other "fifth columnists".
Kerestinec prisoner escape massacre	9–17 July 1941	Kerestinec prison	75	Ustaše	A group of political prisoners (mostly Croatian communists and other anti-fascists) were to be executed in retaliation for Partisan attacks. On 9 July 1941, the first group of ten, including Božidar Adžija, Otokar Keršovani, Ognjen Prica, Zvonimir Richtmann and Viktor Rosenzweig, was executed. The KPH and local Partisans responded by organising a mass-escape on 13 July 1941, the escape failed for all but 14 of the prisoners; 31 were shot whilst escaping, while 44 were recaptured and summarily executed at Dotrščina by 17 July, including August Cesarec.
Banski Grabovac massacre	24–25 July 1941	Grabovac, near Petrinja	c. 1,200	Ustaše	Massacre of Serbs by Ustaše.
Drvar massacre	27 July 1941	Drvar	550	Chetniks and Serb rebels	Massacre of 350 Croats and 200 Muslims after the capture of Drvar.
Brotnja massacre	27 July 1941	Brotnja	37	Chetniks	Massacre of 37 Croats in the village of Brotnja by Chetniks during the Srb uprising.
Bosansko Grahovo massacre	27 July 1941	Bosansko Grahovo	c. 100	Chetniks and Serb rebels	Massacre of Croats in Bosansko Grahovo by Chetniks and other Serb rebels, led by Branko Bogunović, during the Srb uprising.
Obljaj massacre	27 July 1941	Obljaj, Korita, Luka, Ugarci and Crni Lug	250+	Chetniks	Chetnik massacre of Croats across several villages near Bosansko Grahovo during the Srb uprising.
Trubar massacre	27 July 1941	Trubar, Bosanska Krajina	200+	Serb rebels	Massacre of Croats, members of a Catholic pilgrimage, who were ambushed near Drvar by Serb rebels.
Ličko Petrovo Selo massacre	27 July 1941	Ličko Petrovo Selo	313	Ustaše	Massacre of Serbs by Ustaše in Ličko Petrovo Selo.
Ivanović Jarak massacre	29 July 1941	Ivanović Jarak, Kordun	380	Ustaše	Massacre of Serbs by Ustaše.
Velika Kladuša massacre	29 July 1941	Velika Kladuša and surroundings	c. 4,000	Ustaše	Massacre of Serbs by Ustaše near Velika Kladuša, under the Ičungar Hill.
Glina massacre	30 July–3 August 1941	Glina	c. 1,200–2,000	Ustaše	Massacre of Serbs by Ustaše.
Gospić massacre (1941)	Late July - Early August 1941	District of Gospić	c. 3,000	Ustaše	Large-scale massacres of Serbs by Ustaše in the district of Gospić.
Boričevac massacre	2 August 1941	Boričevac	179	Chetniks	Massacre of Croats in the village of Boričevac by Chetniks during the Srb uprising
Kruščica camp massacre	5 August 1941	Kruščica concentration camp	74	Ustaše	Massacre of Serbs from Pale at the Kruščica concentration camp by Ustaše.
Višegrad massacre (1941)	July–August 1941	Višegrad, Herzegovina	c. 500	Serb villagers	Massacre of Muslims by Bosnian Serbs at Višegrad and environs.
Divoselo massacre	2 August 1941	Near Divoselo	170	Ustaše	Massacre of Serbs by Ustaše, including 120 children.
Sanski Most massacre	2-3 August 1941	Sanski Most and surrounding areas	2,862-5,500	Ustaše	Massacre of Serbs by Ustaše.
Prebilovci massacre	4–6 August 1941	Prebilovci	c. 826	Ustaše	Massacre of Serbs by Ustaše.
Mlakva massacre	6 August 1941	Mlakva	280	Ustaše	Massacre of Serbs by Ustaše, including 191 children.
Slunj massacre	4 August 1941	Slunj	800	Ustaše	Massacre of Serbs by Ustaše.
Krnjeuša massacre	9–10 August 1941	Krnjeuša	240	Chetniks	Massacre of Croat civilians in the parish of Krnjeuša by Chetniks.
Lastve and Zelinovac massacre	9–10 August 1941	Lastve and Zelinovac	130	Chetniks	Massacre of Croats by Chetniks.
Vrtoče massacre	9–10 August 1941	Vrtoče, near Bosanski Petrovac	70	Chetniks	Massacre of Croats by Chetniks.
Bosanska Dubica massacre	20–21 August 1941	Bosanska Dubica	c. 300	Ustaše	Massacre of Serbs by Ustaše.
Čitluk and Strigova massacres	22 August 1941	Čitluk and Strigova	26	Ustaše	Massacre of Serbs by Ustaše.
Maribor prison massacres	24 August 1941 – 3 April 1945	Maribor	689	Nazi Germany	Massacres of Slovene hostages held in the Maribor prison throughout the Nazi occupation of Maribor.
Berkovići massacre	26–28 August 1941	Berkovići	200–300	Chetniks	Massacre of Muslims by Chetniks.
Novoselci massacre	Early August 1941	Novoselci	31	Ustaše	Massacre of Serbs by Ustaše at Novoselci.
Zaklopača massacre	August 1941	Srebrenica	81	Chetniks	Massacre of Muslims by Chetniks under the command of Jezdimir Dangić; a group of Muslims barricaded in a local mekteb (Muslim religious school) at Zaklopača which was then set alight.
Plana massacre	3 September 1941	Plana	425	Chetniks	Muslims massacred by Chetniks in Plana and surrounding villages.
Varcar Vakuf massacre	5 September 1941	Varcar Vakuf	56	Chetniks	Massacre of 44 Muslims and 12 Croats by Chetniks.
Kulen Vakuf massacre	5–8 September 1941	Kulen Vakuf	1,000-3,000	Partisan Drvar Brigade, local Serb rebels, Chetniks	Massacre of Muslims and Croats by the Partisan Drvar Brigade, Chetniks and local Serb peasants at Kulen Vakuf.
Jošan massacre	1941	Jošan	338	Ustaše	Massacre of Serbs by Ustaše.
Javor massacre	1941	Javor	100+	Ustaše	Massacre of Serbs by Ustaše at Javor, near Srebrenica and Ozren.
Kruševac executions	23 September 1941 – 12 June 1944	Slobodište, near Kruševac	1,642	Nazi Germany	Mass-shootings of Chetnik and Partisan POWs and local civilians by German forces.
Mačva massacres	24 September – 9 October 1941	Mačva region	c. 6,000	Nazi Germany Ustaše Kingdom of Hungary	Serbian civilians killed in reprisals during anti-Partisan operations led by German, Ustaše and Hungarian forces.
Ibarski Kolašin massacre	30 September 1941	Ibarski Kolašin	150	Albanians	Massacre of Serbs civilians by Albanian Vulnetari commanded by Shaban Polluzha.
Dvor massacre	September 1941	Dvor	1,556	Ustaše	Massacre of Serbs by Ustaše.
Grubišno Polje massacre	September 1941	Grubišno Polje	1,486	Ustaše	Massacre of Serbs by Ustaše.
Rogatica massacre	October 1941–January 1942	Rogatica district	2,000	Chetniks	Massacre of Muslims by Chetniks after the capture of the town.
Extraordinary Tribunal for Dalmatia	11 October-13 November 1941	Zadar, Šibenik, Kotor, Vodice	500+	Kingdom of Italy	Established by Italian governor Giuseppe Bastianini on 11 October 1941, it held four trials, against alleged Communists (mostly Croats), suspected of responsibility for recent Partisan attacks. The trials were characterized by a hasty procedure without any guarantee for the accused, imposing forty-eight death sentences, of which thirty-five were executed, as well as thirty-seven prison sentences of different lengths. On 24 October 1941, the Extraordinary Tribunal was replaced with the Special Court for Dalmatia, under these courts, another 500 death sentences were imposed until 13 November 1941.
Draginac massacre	14 October 1941	Draginac, near Loznica	2,950	Nazi Germany	Massacre of Suspected Serb partisan sympathizers, Roma and Jewish civilians in reprisals.
Kraljevo massacre	15-20 October 1941	Kraljevo	1,755	Nazi Germany	Wehrmacht murder almost 1,800 civilians in reprisal shootings.
Kragujevac massacre	20–21 October 1941	Kragujevac	2,778	Nazi Germany	More than 2,000 Serb, Roma and Jewish civilians arrested and killed by the Wehrmacht in reprisal shootings.
Prača massacre	mid-November 1941	Prača and surrounding villages	63	Chetniks	Chetniks massacred Muslim civilians in the Prača area.
Valjevo executions	27 November 1941	Valjevo	c. 300	Nazi Germany	Execution of at least 261 out of 365 Partisan POWs by Wehrmacht and Serbian collaborators. The Partisans were handed over to Germans by Mihailović's Chetniks with Pećanac Chetniks serving as intermediary.
Koraj massacre	28 November 1941	Koraj, near Brčko	100+	Chetniks	Massacre of Muslim peasants by Chetniks. The massacre was in response to the 1941 anti-Communist Tuzla Rebellion.
Novi Pazar massacre	November–December 1941	Novi Pazar	176	Chetniks, Vulnetari, Sandžak Muslim militia	115 Serb civilians massacred by Albanian Vulnetari forces and local units of the Sandžak Muslim militia; 61 Muslim civilians massacred by Chetniks during and after the Battle of Novi Pazar.
Čajniče massacre	December 1941	Čajniče	418	Chetniks	Massacre of Muslim civilians by Chetniks.
Divin massacre	December 1941	Divin	423	Chetniks	Massacre of Muslim civilians by Chetniks.
Sopotnik massacre	December 1941	Sopotnik, near Zvornik	86	Chetniks	Massacre of Muslim civilians by Chetniks.
Vlasenica massacre	December 1941–February 1942	Vlasenica	2,000–3,000	Chetniks	Massacre of Muslim civilians by Chetniks.
Visuć massacre	1941	Visuć	85	Ustaše	Massacre of Serbs by Ustaše at Visuć.
Pljevlja massacre	2 December 1941	Pljevlja	74	Kingdom of Italy	Massacre of Montenegrin civilians and captured Partisans by Italian forces during the Uprising in Montenegro.
Foča massacre (1941)	5 December 1941–January 1942	Foča	2,000+	Chetniks	Massacre of Muslims at Foča by Chetnik forces who received the town of Foča from the Royal Italian Army.
Crljevice massacre	7 December 1941	Crljevice near Pljevlja	38	Kingdom of Italy	Killing of villagers of all ages and burning down the village in retaliation for Yugoslav Partisan attack on Pljevlja.
Brčko massacre	10 December 1941	Brčko	350	Ustaše	Massacre of Jews, half of whom were Austrian refugees.
Babina Vlaka massacre	14 December 1941	Babina Vlaka, Jabuka and Mihailovići, near Pljevlja	120	Kingdom of Italy	Massacre of Montenegrin civilians by Italian forces during the Uprising in Montenegro.
Brezije massacre	21 December 1941	Brezije, Slavonia	880	Ustaše	Massacre of Serbs by Ustaše.
Prkos massacre	21 December 1941	Prkos, Central Croatia	478	Ustaše	Massacre of Serbs by Ustaše.
Gornje Taborište massacre	27-28 December 1941	Gornje Taborište	At least 254	Ustaše	Massacre of Serbs by Ustaše.
Goražde massacre (1941-1942)	30 December 1941 – 26 January 1942	Goražde	1,370–2,050	Chetniks	Massacre of mainly Bosniak Muslims and some Croats by Chetnik forces; corpses left hanging in the town or thrown into the Drina river.
Žepa massacre	late 1941	Žepa	c. 300	Chetniks	Massacre of Muslims by Chetnik forces at Žepa.
Čelebić massacre (1942)	January 1942	Čelebić	54	Chetniks	Massacre of Muslims by Chetnik forces at Čelebić; village later torched.
Bloody January of Banat	3-9 January 1942	Velika Kikinda, Petrovgrad, Mokrin, Dragutinovo, Banatsko Aranđelovo	159	Nazi Germany	Public exaction of hostages as reprisal for the killing of three Germans by the Partisans.
Melovo and Mijovac massacres	5-6 January 1942	Melovo and Mijovac	48	Pećanac Chetniks	Killing of Romani civilians including women and children, 4 in Melovo and 44 in Mijovac by Pećanac Chetniks
Žitkovac executions	5 January 1942	Žitkovac	43	Nazi Germany	11 captured and 32 Romani civilians executed by German soldiers. Executed Romani were arrested by Serbian Volunteer Corps
Žabalj massacre	6-9 January 1942	Žabalj	666	Kingdom of Hungary	Massacre of Serbs and Jews by Hungarian forces at Žabalj.
Gospođinci massacre	6-7 January 1942	Gospođinci	100	Kingdom of Hungary	Massacre of Serbs by Hungarian forces at Gospođinci
Čurug massacre	6–9 January 1942	Čurug	900	Kingdom of Hungary	Massacre of Serbs by Hungarian forces at Čurug
Đurđevo massacre	6-7 January 1942	Đurđevo	300	Kingdom of Hungary	Massacre of Serbs by Hungarian forces at Đurđevo
Titel massacre	6-7 January 1942	Titel	60–80	Kingdom of Hungary	Massacre of Serbs by Hungarian forces at Titel
Temerin massacre	7-9 January 1942	Temerin	37	Kingdom of Hungary	Massacre of Jews by Hungarian forces at Temerin.
Pridvorica massacre	7 January 1942	Pridvorica	180	Muslim Ustaše	Massacre of Serbs by Muslim Ustaše units.
Dražgoše massacre	11–12 January 1942	Dražgoše	41	Nazi Germany	Slovene hostages executed by the Wehrmacht in Dražgoše.
Draksenić massacre	13–15 January 1942	Draksenić	c. 360	Ustaše	Massacre of approximately 360 Serbs by Ustaše and Home Guard at Draksenić.
Voćin massacre	14 January 1942	Voćin	350	Ustaše	Massacre of Serbs by Ustaše.
Novi Sad raid	22–23 January 1942	Novi Sad	3,300-3,800	Kingdom of Hungary	Massacre of Jews and Serbs driven onto the frozen Danube by Hungarian forces at Novi Sad.
Bečej raid	27 January 1942	Bečej	250	Kingdom of Hungary	Massacre of Jews and Serbs driven onto the frozen Tisa River by Hungarian forces at Bečej.
Srebrenica massacre	January 1942	Srebrenica and environs	c. 1,000	Chetniks	Massacre of Muslims by Chetniks in Srebrenica and nearby villages.
Višegrad massacre (1942)	January 1942	Višegrad	1,000+	Chetniks	Massacre of Muslims by Chetniks at Višegrad.
Pljeva executions	February 1942	Pljeva, Central Bosnia	41	Partisans	Captured Croatian Home Guards executed by Partisans.
Piskavica and Ivanjska massacre	5, 12 February 1942	Piskavica and Ivanjska	520	Ustaše	Massacre of Serbs by Ustaše at Piskavica and Ivanjska
Drakulić massacre	7 February 1942	Drakulić, Šargovac, Motike, near Banja Luka	2,315	Ustaše	Massacre of Serbs by Ustaše at Drakulić, Šargovac, and Motike, including some 500 children.
Bojnik massacre	17 February 1942	Bojnik	476	Kingdom of Bulgaria	Serb civilians massacred by Bulgarian forces in response to the alleged sheltering of Partisans.
Dubrave massacre	March 1942 — February 1943	Dubrave, near Nikšić	300	Partisans	Massacre of civilians suspected of collaboration with Chetniks.
Drakan massacre	3 March 1942	Drakan	42	Chetniks	Massacre of Muslims by Chetniks at Drakan
Resnik massacre	5 March 1942	Resnik	51	Chetniks	Muslims killed by Chetniks after being forced into the Drina river, where they were drowned.
Stari Brod massacre	22 March–May 1942	Stari Brod and Miloševići, near Višegrad	6,000+	Ustaše	Massacre of more than 6,000 Serbs committed by the Black Legion and Ustaše Muslim militia.
Begovo Brdo massacre	3 April 1942	Begovo Brdo, near Cetingrad	121	Ustaše	Massacre of Serb civilians, mainly children, by Ustaše the under the command of Ante Moškova. Most of the victims were slaughtered at the Latićki forest.
Krstinja massacre	April 1942	Krstinja	759	Ustaše	Massacre of Serb civilians, mainly children, women and the elderly.
Mrkonjić Grad massacres	Mid-April 1942	Grad, Gornja Podgorja, Dabrac, near Mrkonjić Grad	180	Chetniks	Chetniks, under the command of Uroš Drenović, massacred Muslim civilians in villages near Mrkonjić Grad.
Kolarić massacre	17 April 1942	Kolarić, near Vojnić	99	Ustaše	Massacre of Serbs by Ustaše.
Ljubljana executions	24 April–24 July 1942	Province of Ljubljana	1,000+	Kingdom of Italy	Massacre of more than 1,000 Slovene hostages by Italian forces across the Province of Ljubljana.
Pristina killings	Late June 1942	Pristina area	100	Albanians	Killings of Serbs by Albanians in Pristina and vicinity.
Fiume massacres	July 1942	Province of Fiume	800	Kingdom of Italy	Italian forces destroyed six villages in the area around Fiume during anti-Partisan reprisals, killing 800 Croat and Slovene civilians.
Čabar massacre	July 1942	Čabar	132	Kingdom of Italy	Italian forces massacred Croats.
Hrib massacre	July 1942	Hrib, near Gerovo	40-60	Kingdom of Italy	Italian forces massacred 40-60 Croats.
Podhum massacre	12 July 1942	Podhum	118	Kingdom of Italy	Massacre of Croat men and boys by Italian forces in the village Podhum
Sadilovac massacre	31 July 1942	Sadilovac	580	Ustaše	Massacre of Serb inhabitants of the villages surrounding Sadilovac, including 270 children.
Rog massacre	July–August 1942	Rog, near Kočevje	300	Kingdom of Italy	Massacre of Slovenian civilians by Italian forces during anti-Partisan operations.
Jermendol massacre	July–August 1942	Jermendol, near Babno Polje	40	Kingdom of Italy	Slovenian civilians massacred by Italian forces
Syrmia massacre	August 1942	Region of Syrmia	c. 3,000-7,000	Ustaše, Nazi Germany	Massacre of between 3,000-7,000 Serbs following a joint military anti-partisan operation in the Syrmia by Ustaše and the German Wehrmacht.
Foča massacre (1942)	August 1942	Foča	c. 2,000–3,000	Chetniks	Massacre of Muslims by Chetniks in Foča region.
Ustikolina massacre	August 1942	Ustikolina	2,500	Chetniks	Massacre of Muslims by Chetniks.
Dragljane massacre	August 1942	Dragljane, near Vrgorac	150	Chetniks, Kingdom of Italy	Massacre of 150 Croats by Chetnik and Italian forces
Kusonje massacre	13 August 1942	Kusonje	463	Ustaše	Massacre of Serbs who were thrown into pits by Ustaše.
Sloboština massacre	16 August 1942	Sloboština, near Požega	1,368	Ustaše	Massacre of Serbs by Ustaše, primarily women and children, from the village and its surroundings.
Zabiokovlje massacre	29 August 1942	Zabiokovlje region, near Makarska	141–160	Chetniks	Massacre of 141-160 Croats from several villages in the Zabiokovlje, Biokovo and Cetina areas of southern Croatia by Chetniks, under the command of Petar Baćović, that had been participating in the Italian anti-Partisan "Operation Albia".
Makarska massacre	September 1942	Makarska	900	Chetniks	Chetniks, under the command of Petar Baćović, massacre Croats around the town of Makarska.
Dabnica massacre	19 September 1942	Dabnica	18	Kingdom of Bulgaria	Massacre of Macedonian civilians by Bulgarian forces.
Mostar massacre	October 1942	Mostar and surrounding areas	200	Chetniks	Croat and Muslim civilians killed by Chetniks.
Gata massacre	1 October 1942	Gata	100+	Chetniks	Croat civilians killed by Chetniks for pro-Yugoslav Partisan sympathies and in retaliation for the destruction of the Split-Omiš road.
Drežnica massacre	3 October 1942	Drežnica	62–142	Chetniks	Massacre of Croat civilians by Chetniks.
Dugopolje massacre (1942)	5 October 1942	Dugopolje, Kotlenice and neighbouring settlements	120	Chetniks, Kingdom of Italy	Croats killed by Chetniks, supported by Italian forces.
Španovica massacre	8 October 1942	Španovica	143	Partisans	Massacre of Croat civilians by Partisans.
Ostrovica and Tugare massacre	10–20 October 1942	Ostrovica, Tugare and surrounding areas	190	Chetniks, Kingdom of Italy	Croat civilians massacred by Chetnik and Italian forces during the "Dinara" anti-Partisan offensive.
Kriva Reka massacre	11–14 October 1942	Kriva Reka and neighbouring areas	690	Nazi Germany, Kingdom of Bulgaria	Serb civilians massacred in reprisals by the 7th SS Volunteer Mountain Division Prinz Eugen and Bulgarian forces during and after Operation Kopaonik.
Prozor massacre	14–15 October 1942	Prozor area	543–2,500	Chetniks	Massacre of Croats and Bosnian Muslims by Chetniks due to suspected harboring and aiding the Partisans. It took place during Operation Alfa.
Nova Krivaja massacre	29 October 1942	Nova Krivaja	28	Ustaše	Following battle with local Partisans, Ustaše massacred Serbs in Nova Krivaja. Most victim's bodies were thrown down the well after the killing.
Primošten massacre	16 November 1942	Primošten	150	Kingdom of Italy	Croats killed by Italian forces by deliberately shelling the town of Primošten in retaliation for an earlier Partisan attack.
Popovac massacre	20 December 1942	Popovac near Voćin	36	Ustaše	Massacre of Serbs by Ustaše. 12 victims were killed by cold weapons, rest killed by firing squad.
Gospić massacres (1943)	January 1943	Several villages in the Gospić district	635	Kingdom of Italy	Italian forces, belonging to the "Lombardia" and "Re" divisions, killed 635 civilians from several villages near Gospić, during anti-Partisan operations.
Vrlika massacre	January 1943	Vrlika and surrounding areas	103	Chetniks	Massacre of Croats by Chetniks, under the command of Petar Baćović and Momčilo Đujić.
Široka Kula massacre (1943)	January 1943	Široka Kula	185	Kingdom of Italy	Massacre of 185 Croat civilians in the village of Široka Kula by Italian forces
Bijelo Polje massacre	January 1943	Bijelo Polje	c.1,000	Chetniks	Chetniks, led by Pavle Đurišić, razed 33 Muslim villages in the area around Bijelo Polje, killing Muslim civilians.
Turkanj massacre	January–February 1943	Turkanj, near Slunj	208	Kingdom of Italy	Massacre of Croat hostages and civilians by Italian forces
Maovice massacre	26 January 1943	Maovice	60 - 80	Chetniks	Massacre of Croats by Chetniks of the Dinara Division, led by Momčilo Đujić.
Kijevo massacre	27 January 1943	Kijevo	45	Chetniks	Massacre of Croats by Chetniks in the village of Kijevo.
Massacres in Pljevlja, Priboj, Čajniče and Foča	January–February 1943	Pljevlja, Priboj, Čajniče and Foča districts and surrounding villages	9,200	Chetniks	Massacre of Muslims (including 8,000 civilians) by Chetniks, led by Pavle Đurišić, across several districts and villages in southeastern Bosnia and Sandžak.
Bukovica massacre	4–7 February 1943	Bukovica, Pljevlja	576+	Chetniks	Massacre of more than 576 Muslim civilians during Chetnik attack on positions held by Sandžak Muslim militia.
Kasidoli massacre	5 February 1943	Kasidoli, Priboj	227	Chetniks	Massacre of 227 Muslim civilians in village of Kasidoli by Chetniks of Vuk Kalaitović.
Mekinjar massacre	17 February 1943	Mekinjar, near Udbina	30	Chetniks, Kingdom of Italy	Croats killed by Chetniks and Italian forces.
Goražde massacre (1943)	March 1943	Goražde	500	Chetniks	Massacre of Muslim civilians by Chetniks.
Breza massacre	March and April 1943	Breza	74	Chetniks	Massacre of suspected Communists and Partisan sympathisers by Chetniks.
Kninsko Polje massacre	April 1943	Kninsko Polje, near Knin	1,000	Chetniks	Massacre of 1,000 Croats at a makeshift execution site near Knin.
Šibenik executions	23 April–15 June 1943	Šibenik and its environs	240	Kingdom of Italy	Execution of 240 Croat hostages in the Šibenik district by Italian forces, in retaliation for Partisan attacks
Vrpolje and Perković massacre	22 May 1943	Vrpolje and Perković	66	Kingdom of Italy	Massacre of Croat civilians, rounded up from the villages of Vrpolje and Perković, in retaliation for a Partisan attack on the Šibenik-Split railway
Međeđe massacre	May–June 1943	Međeđe, near Nikšić	72	Kingdom of Italy	Massacre of Montenegrin and Serb civilians by Italian forces.
Bar massacre (1943)	June 1943	Bar, Montenegro	180	Kingdom of Italy	Massacre of Montenegrin prisoners being held in the Bar concentration camp
Komin massacre	June 1943	Komin, near Ploče	228	Kingdom of Italy	Croats massacred by Italian forces.
Bijeljina massacre (1943)	June 1943	Bijeljina	1,139	Nazi Germany	Massacre of Serb civilians by German forces during anti-Partisan reprisals.
Vareška Reka massacre	June 1943	Vareška Reka–Ibar confluence	15	Vulnetari and gendarmerie	Massacre of Serbs by Albanian paramilitaries.
Trepča mine executions	3 June 1943	Trepča mine, Mitrovica	37	Albanians	Mass shooting of 37 Serbs by Albanians, Albanian gendarmerie and prison guards at the Trepča mine prison, most of whom were workers that had fallen ill, and among whom several were peasants from the Mitrovica vicinity.
Trepča mine executions	7 June 1943	Trepča mine, Mitrovica	27	Albanians	Mass shooting of 27 Serbs by Albanians, Albanian gendarmerie and prison guards.
Doli Pivski massacre	7 June 1943	Doli Plivski, Montenegro	522	Ustaše, Nazi Germany	Massacre of 522 Serb civilians by the 7th SS Volunteer Mountain Division Prinz Eugen, along with the Ustaše and the SS Handschar Division.
Vataša massacre	16 June 1943	Vataša	12	Kingdom of Bulgaria	Massacre of 12 Macedonian civilians (suspected to have been members of the League of Communist Youth of Yugoslavia) by Bulgarian forces.
Kolašin executions	25 June 1943	Kolašin	180	Kingdom of Italy	Hostages shot by Italian forces.
Žrnovica massacre	July 1943	Žrnovnica and surrounding villages	97	Kingdom of Italy	Croat civilians killed by Italian forces during anti-Partisan reprisals.
Femića Krš massacre	2 July 1943	Femića Krš	52	Kingdom of Italy	Montenegrin civilians killed by Italian forces of the 'Venezia' division.
Lovreć massacre	10 July 1943	Lovreć and surrounding areas	112	Chetniks,Kingdom of Italy, Nazi Germany	Croats (Partisan POWs and civilians) killed by Chetniks, 7th SS Division, and Italian forces, victims were burned alive in houses.
Rotimlja massacre	12 July 1943	Rotimlja, near Stolac	66	Nazi Germany	Muslims massacred in reprisals the 7th SS Volunteer Mountain Division Prinz Eugen.
Košutica massacre	12 July 1943	Košutica, near Sokolac	68	Nazi Germany	Muslims massacred in reprisals by the 7th SS Volunteer Mountain Division Prinz Eugen.
Zrin massacre	9-10 September 1943	Zrin	270	Partisans	Massacre of 270 Croat civilians in Zrin by Partisans
Foibe massacres	9 September 1943 – 1946	Julian March, Kvarner and Dalmatia	Between 3,000–5,000 or c.11,000–20,000	Partisans and OZNA	Massacres of reprisals against local ethnic Italian population (Istrian Italians and Dalmatian Italians), as well against anti-communists in general (even Croats and Slovenes) and against real, potential or presumed opponents of Tito communism.
Tićan massacre	11 September 1943	Tićan, near Višnjan	84	Nazi Germany	Croats massacred by the 71st Infantry Division, during anti-Partisan reprisals.
Uroševac massacre	11–12 September 1943	Uroševac area	60	Albanians	Massacre of Serbs by Albanians, commanded by Amdija Jašarević
Imotski massacre	17-30 September 1943	Imotski, Sinj and neighboring villages	230	Nazi Germany	Croats massacred by the 7th SS Volunteer Mountain Division Prinz Eugen.
Mravince and Majdan massacre	27 September 1943	Mravince and Majdan, near Split	69	Nazi Germany	Croat civilians massacred by the 7th SS Volunteer Mountain Division Prinz Eugen.
Dugopolje massacre (1943)	28–29 September 1943	Dugopolje	100	Nazi Germany	Croat civilians massacred by 7th SS Volunteer Mountain Division Prinz Eugen.
Košute massacre	September 1943	Košute and neighbouring villages	500+	Nazi Germany	Croat civilians massacred in reprisals by the 7th SS Volunteer Mountain Division Prinz Eugen.
Rakoš massacre	October 1943	Rakoš	63	Albanians	Shooting of Serb villagers
Massacres in Mužini, Cere and Feštini	2 October 1943	Mužini, Cere and Feštini, near Žminj	44	Nazi Germany	Croats massacred by German forces; 28 in Mužini, 10 in Cere and 6 in Feštini.
Višegrad massacre (1943)	5 October 1943	Višegrad	2,000+	Chetniks	Muslim civilians massacred by Chetniks after the capture of Višegrad.
Gornji Hrastovac massacre	6-7 October 1943	Gornji Hrastovac	1,256	Ustaše	Massacre of Serbs by Ustaše.
Kresini massacre	7 October 1943	Kresini, near Žminj	57	Nazi Germany	Croats massacred by German forces of the II SS Panzer Corps during the anti-Partisan offensive (Unternehmen Istrien).
Peć killings	November–December 1943	Peć district	230	Albanians	killings of Serbs
Pelješac massacres	November 1943	Pelješac	104	Nazi Germany	Croat civilians massacred in reprisals by the 7th SS Volunteer Mountain Division Prinz Eugen across several villages on the Pelješac peninsula.
Baćina massacre	2 November 1943	Baćina and neighbouring areas	110	Nazi Germany	Croat civilians massacred in reprisals by the 7th SS Volunteer Mountain Division Prinz Eugen.
Ivanci massacre	30 November 1943	Ivanci	73	Nazi Germany	Serb civilians (suspected Partisan sympathisers) killed by German forces in reprisals.
Lug and Kuk massacre	16 December 1943	Lug and Kuk, near Tomislavgrad	81	Nazi Germany	Massacre of 81 Croats by the 7th SS Volunteer Mountain Division Prinz Eugen in retaliation for nearby Partisan attacks
1943 Zagreb street execution	20 December 1943	Zagreb	16	Ustaše	16 anti-Fascists (14 Croats, 2 Slovenes), notably Bogdan Ogrizović, hanged on 20 December 1943 on butcher hooks on a public street at the western end of Dubrava in retaliation for the killing of an Ustaše agent, Ljudevit Tiljak, by the Partisans
Vranić massacre	20–21 December 1943	Vranić	68	Chetniks	Serb civilians killed by Chetniks at Vranić under suspicion of harbouring and/or supporting the Partisans
Kopljare massacre	25 December 1943	Kopljare	22	Chetniks	19 Romani and 3 Serbs were killed by Chetniks of Nikola Kalabić in the night of 25 December and all Romani houses as well as two houses of villagers were razed.
Šajini and Bokordići massacre	8-9 January 1944	Šajini and Bokordići	76	Nazi Germany	Croat civilians killed (54 in Šajini and 22 in Bokordići) by Wehrmacht forces of the 71st Infantry Division.
Bosut massacre	9–12 March 1944	Bosut, Sremska Rača, Jamena	645	Nazi Germany/Ustaše (SS-Handschar Division)	Massacre of Serb civilians by the SS-Handschar Division during Operation "Wegweiser".
Massacre of villages under Kamešnica	26–30 March 1944	Several villages between Kamešnica and Mosor near Split	1,525–3,000	Nazi Germany, Chetniks	Croatian civilians massacred by members of the 7th SS Volunteer Mountain Division Prinz Eugen and the 369th Infantry Division, supported by Dinara Chetniks, across several Croat villages in the Kamešnica and Mosor region, near Split.
Drugovac massacre	29 April 1944	Drugovac near Smederevo	72	Chetniks	Largest Chetnik masacre in any Serb village. Chetniks killed 72, burnt down around 120 and plundered 200 houses in pro-Partisan village Drugovac.
Lipa massacre	30 April 1944	Lipa, near Rijeka	269	Nazi Germany, Chetniks, RSI	Massacre of Croat civilians in Lipa, near Rijeka by the SS Police Regiment Bozen, Chetniks and local Italian Fascists, in retaliation for a Partisan ambush near Rupa
Brkini villages massacres	18 May 1944	Tominje, Podbeže, Zajelšje, Pregarje, Gabrk and Huje	69	Nazi Germany	Massacre of Slovene civilians from several villages in the Brkini region during an anti-Partisan offensive.
Dobranje massacre	May 1944	Dobranje	136	Partisans	Massacre of Domobrani POWs and Croat civilians by Partisans.
Goražde massacre (1944)	May 1944	Goražde	c.50	Chetniks	Muslims massacred by Chetniks.
Žeževica massacre	June 1944	Žeževica	54	Nazi Germany	Croat civilians massacred in reprisals by the 7th SS Volunteer Mountain Division Prinz Eugen.
Štrpce massacre	30 June 1944	Štrpce	50	Kingdom of Bulgaria	Mass execution of Serbs in retaliation for the death of a Bulgarian soldier.
Velika massacre	28 July 1944	Velika, near Plav	428+	SS-"Skanderbeg"	Massacre of Serbs, mostly children, women and elderly, by Albanian SS members during Operation Draufgänger.
Zagniezde and Udora massacre	11 September 1944	Zagniezde (Zagnježđe) and Udora (near Bjelojevići, Burmazi and Stolac)	~100+	Nazi Germany	On 11 September 1944, under orders from General Fritz Neidholdt, the 369th "Devil's Division" destroyed the Croatian-Muslim villages of Zagniezde (Zagnježđe) and Udora (near Bjelojevići, Burmazi and Stolac), hanging all the men and driving away all the women and children.
Hrvatska Dubica massacre	18–19 September 1944	Hrvatska Dubica	c. 55	Ustaše	Massacre of mostly Serb victims by Ustaše at Hrvatska Dubica.
Beličica massacre	19 September 1944	Beličica	36	Balli Kombëtar	Massacre of Macedonian civilians and captured Partisans by Albanian Balli Kombëtar forces.
Blatec executions	September 1944	Blatec	15	Kingdom of Bulgaria	15 Turkish men were executed for resisting to fight in Srem. А ban was imposed on talking about the execution.
Bošnjane massacre	2 October 1944	Bošnjane near Paraćin	55	Chetniks	Massacre of Partisan prisoners of war by Chetniks. Victims were tortured before execution.
Prždevo and Besvica massacres	6 October 1944	Demir Kapija municipality	60	(Tsardom of Bulgaria (1908–1946)) Kingdom of Bulgaria	Massacre of the local Turkish and Macedonian population from the villages of Prždevo and Besvica.
Istibanje-Teranci massacres	October 1944	Istibanja and Teranci	17	Nazi Germany	Local Turkish population was massacred
Daksa executions	October 1944	Daksa	c. 53	Partisans	Partisans executed around 53 Croat prisoners suspected of being collaborationists
Communist purges in Serbia	October 1944–May 1945	Central Serbia and Vojvodina	at least 55,973	Partisans	Massacres against people perceived as war criminals, quislings, ideological opponents and ethnic minorities by Partisans. In 2009, the government of Serbia formed a State Commission to investigate the secret burial places of victims. The Commission compiled a registry of names, basic biographical data, and details of persecution. The registry contains a total of 55,973 names, including 27,367 Germans, 14,567 Serbs and 6,112 Hungarians.
Radolišta massacre	28 October 1944	Radolišta	84	Nazi Germany	Massacre of Albanian civilians by German forces during an anti-Partisan reprisal.
Flight and expulsion of Germans in Yugoslavia	November 1944-March 1948	German-speaking areas of Yugoslavia, especially Banat and other areas	c.58,000	Partisans	Massacres and killings of German civilians. A total of 48,447 people died in camps; 7,199 were massacred or executed by Partisans, and another 1,994 perished in Soviet labour camps after being deported by Yugoslav authorities.
Zalug massacre	December 1944	Zalug near Prijepolje	30	Nazi Germany	Massacre of 30 people (17 Serbs and 13 Bosniaks) of all ages by German forces during the retreat through Sandžak
Tovarnik massacre	December 1944	Tovarnik	51	Partisans	Massacre of 51 Croat and Germans (Volksdeutsche) civilians by Partisans
Bribir massacre	December 1944	Bribir	33	Chetniks	Croats massacred by Chetniks from the Dinara Division. The village was razed to the ground.
Bloody Christmas	7–9 January 1945	North Macedonia	1,200	Partisans	Massacres of ethnic Bulgarians and pro-Bulgarian Macedonians by Yugoslav Partisans.
Široki Brijeg massacre	7–15 February 1945	Široki Brijeg	28	Partisans	Massacre of Croatian Franciscan Friars by Partisans, twelve of whom were burned alive.
Frankolovo massacre	12 February 1945	Frankolovo	100	Nazi Germany	Slovene hostages shot or hanged in retaliation for a Partisan ambush that fatally wounded the Nazi district administrator of Celje, Anton Dorfmeister.
Kozara massacres	17–22 February 1945	Kozara	140+	Ustaše	Massacre of mostly Serb victims by Ustaše at Kozara
Villa Luburić massacre	February–April 1945	Sarajevo	323	Ustaše	Mass executions of Serbs by Ustaše at the Villa Luburić headquarters in Sarajevo.
Bar massacre	March 1945	Bar, Montenegro	400–450 to 1,500–2,000	Partisans	Massacre of Albanians by Partisans.
Hrastina massacre	24 April 1945	Hrastina	43	Ustaše	Massacre of German Sinti civilians found in hiding.
Jakljan executions	May 1945	Jakljan	214	Partisans	German prisoners executed by Partisans at Jakljan.
Gračani massacre	May 1945	Zagreb	295 (excavated bodies)	Partisans	Execution of NDH prisoners of war and local civilians by Partisans.
Kucja Dolina massacre	May 1945	Kucja Dolina	800+	Partisans	Killing of Slovene and Croat Home Guard prisoners and civilians by Partisans.
Fiume Autonomists purge	May 1945	Rijeka and surrounding areas	650	Partisans	Partisan and OZNA liquidations of prominent members and supporters of the Rijeka Autonomist Party and the Liburnian Autonomist Movement after the liberation of Rijeka.
Sisak massacre	4 May 1945	Sisak, Croatia	c. 500	Ustaše	Executions of Serbs a few hours before the town was liberated.
Pečovnik massacre	8–9 May 1945	Pečovnik	12,000	Partisans	Killing of Croat POWs and civilians by Partisans.
Tezno massacre	19–26 May 1945	Tezno, near Maribor	15,000	Partisans	Execution of NDH prisoners of war and civilians by Partisans.
Kočevski Rog massacre	Late May 1945	Kočevski Rog	10,000–12,000	Partisans	Execution of Slovene Home Guard members, Croat, Serb and Montenegrin collaborationists, Italian and German troops, by the Partisans.
Macelj massacre	May–June 1945	Macelj	1,163 (excavated bodies)	Partisans	Execution of NDH prisoners and local civilians by Partisan forces
Barbara Pit massacre	25 May–6 June 1945	Huda Jama	1,416	Partisans	Croat and Slovene POWs with their families killed by Partisans for reprisal.

== See also ==
- Bloody Christmas (1945)
- List of massacres in the Bosnian War
- List of massacres in the Croatian War
- List of massacres in the Kosovo War

== Sources ==
Books

- Antonijević, Nenad (2009). Mirković, Jovan (ed.). Албански злочини над Србима на Косову и Метохији у Другом светском рату, документа, друго измењено и допуњено издање (PDF). Belgrade: Музеј жртава геноцида. Archived (PDF) from the original on 10 August 2016.
- Avramov, Smilja (1995). Genocide in Yugoslavia. BIGZ. ISBN 9788613007982.
- Bojović, Jovan R., ed. (1987). Kolašinski četnički zatvor, 1942–1943: Zbornik radova sa naučnog skupa održanog u Kolašinu 14. i 15. maja 1984 [Kolašin Chetnik Prison 1942–1943, Proceedings from the Scientific Conference in Kolašin on 14 and 15 May 1984] (in Serbo-Croatian). Historical Institute of Montenegro. OCLC 605992247.
- Božović, Srđan (2004). Nemački zločin u Alibunaru 1941. Narodni muzej Pančevo.
- Čekić, Smail (1996). Genocid nad Bošnjacima u Drugom svjetskom ratu: dokumenti. Udruženje Muslimana za antigenocidne aktivnosti.
- Corsellis, John; Ferrar, Marcus (2006). Slovenia, 1945: Memories of Death and Survival After World War II. I.B.Tauris. ISBN 978-1-85043-840-3. Archived from the original on 14 February 2022.
- Ćuković, Mirko (1964). Sandžak. Nolit-Prosveta.
- Dedijer, Vladimir (1992). The Yugoslav Auschwitz and the Vatican: The Croatian Massacre of the Serbs During World War II. Prometheus Books. ISBN 9780879757526. Archived from the original on 19 March 2017.
- Dedijer, Vladimir; Miletić, Antun (1990). Genocid nad Muslimanima, 1941–1945 (in Serbo-Croatian). Svjetlost.
- Dizdar, Zdravko; Sobolevski, Mihael (1999). Prešućivani četnički zločini u Hrvatskoj i u Bosni i Hercegovini 1941–1945 (in Serbo-Croatian). Hrvatski institut za povijest.
- Dizdar, Zdravko (2002). Četnički zločini u Bosni i Hercegovini, 1941–1945 [Chetnik Crimes in Bosnia and Herzegovina, 1941–1945] (in Serbo-Croatian). Hrvatski institut za povijest [Croatian Institute of History]. ISBN 978-953-6491-86-5.
- Dulić, Tomislav (2005). Utopias of Nation: Local mass killings in Bosnia and Herzegovina, 1941–1942.
- Glišić, Venceslav (1970). Teror i zločini nacističke Nemačke u Srbiji 1941-1944. Belgrade: Rad.
- Goldstein, Ivo (2007), "The Independent State of Croatia in 1941: On the Road to Catastrophe", in Ramet, Sabrina P. (ed.), The Independent State of Croatia 1941–45, Routledge, pp. 19–29, ISBN 978-0-415-44055-4
- Goldstein, Slavko (2012). 1941: The Year That Keeps Returning (2nd ed.). New York Review Books. ISBN 978-1-59017-673-3.
- Hoare, Marko Attila (2006). Genocide and Resistance in Hitler's Bosnia: The Partisans and the Chetniks 1941–1943. Oxford University Press. ISBN 978-0-19-726380-8.
- Hoare, Marko Attila (2013). Bosnian Muslims in the Second World War. Oxford University Press. ISBN 978-0-231-70394-9.
- Jelić Butić, Fikreta (1986). Četnici u Hrvatskoj, 1941-1945 [Chetniks in Croatia, 1941-1945]. Globus. ISBN 9788634300109.
- Judah, Tim (2000). The Serbs: History, Myth and the Destruction of Yugoslavia. Yale University Press. ISBN 978-0-300-08507-5. Archived from the original on 8 February 2021.
- Kozlica, Ivan (2012). Krvava Cetina [Bloody Cetina] (in Croatian). Hrvatski centar za ratne žrtve. ISBN 978-953-57409-0-2.
- Kurapovna, Marcia (2010). Shadows on the mountain: the Allies, the Resistance, and the rivalries that doomed WWII Yugoslavia. John Wiley and Sons. ISBN 978-0-470-08456-4.
- Lopičić, Đorđe N. (2009). Nemački ratni zločini 1941-1945: presude jugoslovenskih vojnih sudova. Belgrade: Muzej žrtava genocida.
- Lopičić, Đorđe N., ed. (2010). Mađarski ratni zločini 1941- 1945: presude jugoslovenskih sudova. Belgrade: Muzej žrtava genocida. ISBN 9788686831026.
- Lukajić, Lazar (2005). "Fratri i ustaše kolju - zločini i svjedoci" (PDF) (in Serbian). Belgrade: Fond za istraživanje genocida. Archived (PDF) from the original on 27 January 2012.
- Malcolm, Noel (1994). Bosnia: A Short History. New York University Press. ISBN 978-0-8147-5520-4.
- Markovski, Nešo (1975). Belčicia na plamen [Belčicia in flames].
- Mojzes, Paul (2011). Balkan Genocides: Holocaust and Ethnic Cleansing in the 20th Century. Rowman & Littlefield. ISBN 9781442206632.
- Morača, Pero (1957). Prelomna godina Narodnooslobodilačkog rata: Narodnooslobodilački pokret krajem 1941 i početkom 1942, pohod proleterskih brigada u Zapadnu Bosnu, Bihaćka operacija, stvaranje NOVJ i I zasjedanje AVNOJ-a. Vojnoizdavački zavod JNA.
- Morrison, Kenneth (2009). Montenegro: A Modern History. New York: I.B. Tauris. ISBN 978-1-84511-710-8.
- Narodnooslobodilačka borba u Dalmaciji, 1941-1945: zbornik dokumenata [National Liberation War near Dalmatia, 1941-1945: a collection of documents] (in Croatian). Vol. 8. Institut za historiju radničkog pokreta Dalmacije. 1985.
- Paris, Edmond (1961). Genocide in Satellite Croatia, 1941-1945: A Record of Racial and Religious Persecutions and Massacres. Chicago: American Institute for Balkan Affairs. Archived from the original on 2 August 2020.
- Pokrajinska komisija za utvrđivanje zločina okupatora i njihovih pomagača u Vojvodini (1946). Zločini okupatora u Vojvodini, 1941-1944. Vol. 1.
- Ramet, Sabrina P. (2006). The Three Yugoslavias: State-Building and Legitimation, 1918–2005. Bloomington: Indiana University Press. ISBN 978-0-253-34656-8. Archived from the original on 19 May 2020.
- Ramet, Sabrina P.; Lazić, Sladjana (2011). "The Collaborationist Regime of Milan Nedić". In Ramet, Sabrina P.; Listhaug, Ola (eds.). Serbia and the Serbs in World War Two. London, England: Palgrave Macmillan. pp. 17–42. ISBN 978-0-230-34781-6.
- Rapaić, Mirko (1999). Lička tragedija: hrvatski zločini geoncida nad srpskim narodom 1941. do 1945. Srpska reč. ISBN 978-86-491-0034-3.
- Redžić, Enver (2005). Bosnia and Herzegovina in the Second World War. Psychology Press. ISBN 978-0-7146-5625-0.
- Scotti, Giacomo (1976). Ustascia tra il fascio e la svastica: storia e crimini del movimento ustascia (in Italian). Incontri.
- Skoko, Savo (1991). Pokolji hercegovačkih Srba '41. Belgrade: Stručna knjiga.
- Tomasevich, Jozo (1975). War and Revolution in Yugoslavia, 1941–1945: The Chetniks. Stanford: Stanford University Press. ISBN 978-0-8047-0857-9. Archived from the original on 27 March 2019.
- Tomasevich, Jozo (2001). War and Revolution in Yugoslavia, 1941–1945: Occupation and Collaboration. Stanford: Stanford University Press. ISBN 978-0-8047-3615-2. Archived from the original on 3 March 2020.
- Tucaković, Šemso (1995). Srpski zločini nad Bošnjacima-muslimanima: 1941-1945. El-Kalem i OKO. Archived from the original on 14 January 2017.
- Vučković, Zvonimir; Krstić, Uglješa (2001). Ravnogorska istorijska čitanka: povest nacionalnog pokreta otpora u II svetskom ratu kroz dela učesnika i svedoka : jubilarno izdanje povodom šezdesetgodišnjice, 1941-2001. Bajat.
- Yeomans, Rory (2015). The Utopia of Terror: Life and Death in Wartime Croatia. Boydell & Brewer. ISBN 9781580465458.
- Zatezalo, Đuro (2005). "Radio sam svoj seljački i kovački posao": svjedočanstva genocida. Zagreb: SKD Prosvijeta. ISBN 953-6627-79-5.
- Radanović, Milan (2016). Kazna i zločin: Snage kolaboracije u Srbiji. Belgrade: Rosa Luxemburg Stiftung.
- Radanović, Milan (2019). Slavonijo, triput si gorila... Zagreb: Srpsko Narodno Vijeće.
- Veljan, Nejra; Ćehajić, Maida (2020). "A Dangerous Nexus? History, Ideology and the Structure of the Contemporary Chetnik Movement". Democracy and Security in Southeastern Europe. VII (1). Sarajevo, Bosnia and Herzegovina: Atlantic Initiative: 22–40. ISSN 1986-5708.
- Živković, Milutin (2017). Санџак 1941-1943 [Sanžak 1941-1943] (in Serbo-Croatian). Belgrade: University of Belgrade.

Reports

- Nedeljković, Dušan (1946). Report on Italian crimes against Yugoslavia and its peoples (Report). Državna komisija za utvrđivanje zločina okupatora i njihovih pomagača.
- United States. Department of State; United States. War Department; International Military Tribunal (1946). Nazi Conspiracy and Aggression (Report). Vol. 1. U.S. Government Printing Office.

Journals

- Dizdar, Zdravko (1996). "Brojidbeni pokazatelji odnosa vojničkih postrojbi na teritoriju Nezavisne Države Hrvatske 1941.-1945. godine" [Statistical indications of the strength of military units in the Independent State of Croatia 1941-1945]. Journal of Contemporary History (in Croatian). 28 (1–2). Zagreb, Croatia: Croatian Institute of History: 161–196.
- Jareb, Mario (December 2011). "Prilog raspravi o karakteru ustanka od 27. srpnja 1941. godine" [An addition to the debate about the character of the uprising of 27 July 1941]. Journal of Contemporary History (in Croatian). 43 (3). Zagreb, Croatia: Croatian Institute of History: 751–771. Archived from the original on 12 June 2020.
- Perrone, Fiorella (2017). "The Horror in the Balkans. Civilian Victims in the Second World War in the Former Yugoslavia". L'Osservatorio.
- Sobolevski, Mihael (2004). "Pljačka i teror Dinarske četničke divizije na području općine Krivi put 28. i 29. prosinca 1944" [Robbery and Terror of Dinara Chetnik Division in the Krivi Put Region on 28 and 29 December 1944]. The Anthology of Senj: Contributions to Geography, Ethnology, Economy, History and Culture (in Croatian). 31 (1). Zagreb, Croatia: Croatian Institute of History: 271–289.

Conference papers and proceedings

- Matović, Ivan, ed. (2012). Zločini četničkog pokreta u Srbiji 1941-1945: Zbornik radova sa okruglog stola održanog 25.9.2012. godine.
- SANU (1995). Genocid nad Srbima u II svetskom ratu. Muzej žrtava genocida i Srpska književna zadruga. Archived from the original on 3 January 2014.

Web

- "Dostojno pokopani nakon 66. godina mučkog smaknuća". Dubrovački vjesnik (in Croatian). 19 June 2010. Archived from the original on 20 July 2010.
- "Na dubrovačkom Domobranskom groblju pokopani posmrtni ostaci 214 njemačkih mornara". Slobodna Dalmacija (in Croatian). 1 March 2013. Archived from the original on 25 July 2015.
- Toljaga, Daniel (18 November 2010). "Prelude to the Srebrenica genocide". Bosnian Institute. Archived from the original on 6 September 2013.
