= Bloody January of Banat =

- Part of World War II in Yugoslavia
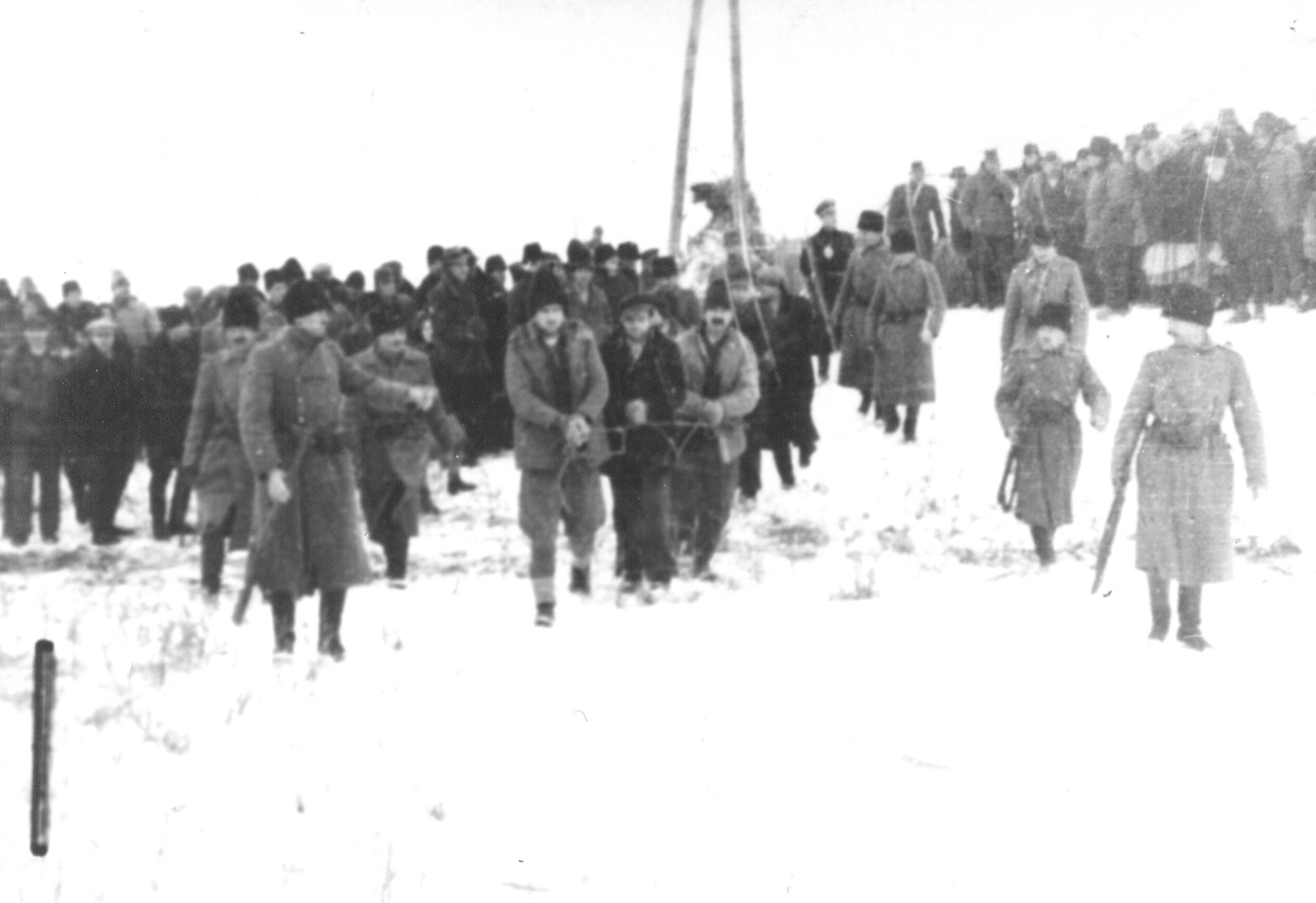
- Taking hostages to execution in Dragutinovo, 9 January 1942
- Location: Banat, Territory of the Military Commander in Serbia
- Date: January 3, 1942-January 9, 1942
- Target: local communists and Roma civilians
- Attack type: massacre
- Deaths: 159
- Perpetrators: German police and local German militia
- Motive: retaliation

Bloody January or Bloody January of Banat (Serbian: Крвави јануар банатски, Krvavi januar banatski) was an organized execution of 159 Serbs and Romas committed by German occupation authorities in the Banat area of Occupied Yugoslavia (now in Serbia) in January 1942. On Friday, 9 January, Germans killed 30 hostages each in Velika Kikinda, Petrovgrad, Mokrin, Dragutinovo and Banatsko Aranđelovo. Nine hostages were already shot in Velika Kikinda on 3 January. This was a collective punishment for the death of three German field guards committed by the local Partisans in August 1941. After the Partisans made several attacks on Germans during 1941, German authorities enacted a policy to execute 50 hostages for every German killed and 25 for every wounded. Victims were mostly local communists and their sympathizers accused of collaborating with the Partisans, as well as 22 Romani civilians added to fill the required quota. Most of the victims were men between 19 and 25 years old, but 11 were women.

== Massacre ==
=== Background ===
Execution od 12 hostages in Petrovgrad (today Zrenjanin) in September 1941

After the April War, Germans occupied Banat. Banat Jews were soon exterminated, but the decision was made not to annihilate nor expel Serbs. But soon, German authorities started mass public executions as means to suppress resistance among local Serbs. Already in April, 36 people were publicly executed in Pančevo, 19 in Petrovgrad and 21 in Vršac. Those early executions were preceded by hastily organized courts-matial which sentenced victims to death.

After the Uprising in Serbia started in July 1941, Germans responded by mass executions of hostages. Hostages ware arrested communists, Partisans, their collaborators, members of their families, but also often people with no guilt whatsoever. There were no judicial proceedings. German police issued lists of people to be executed, usually accompanied by the description of their "guilt". In July, two mass executions were organized in Petrovgrad. In September 1941, Germans executed 10 hostages each in Melenci, Kumane and Mokrin, and 12 more in Petrovgrad. In October 1941, eleven hostages were executed in Petrovgrad.

On 22 December 1941, Paul Bader, German military commander of Serbia, issued an order to execute 50 "communists" for every German killed and 25 for every wounded. On 31 December 1941, German police found dead bodies of three German field guard who were killed by the Dragutinovo Partisans in August near Velika Kikinda.

=== 3 January 1942 ===
On 3 January 1942, German authorities executed nine men from Dragutinovo and Beodra in Velika Kikinda. Six of those were Partisans accused for the death of German guards, and the rest were suspected as their collaborators. Before the execution, a public burial of three killed German field guards was held, attended by local Germans. Victims were publicly shot and then hanged in front of the Orthodox church and left hanging for 24 hours, after which they were buried in a mass grave.

=== 9 January 1942 ===
Because the execution of 3 January did not follow the "50 for 1" rule, new execution was ordered on 7 January (Christmas Day) to take place on 9 January in five towns: Velika Kikinda, Petrovgrad, Mokrin, Dragutinovo and Banatsko Aranđelovo. 30 communist collaborators were to be executed in each town, 150 in total. Because Germans did not have enough communist hostages imprisoned, 22 Romani civilians were added to the list to fill the required quota. The 9 January massacre was ordered by Franz Reith, police prefect for Banat, a local German from Yugoslavia (a Volksdeutscher), who personally oversaw the massacre in Banatsko Aranđelovo. The executors were members of Deutsche Mannschaft (local Volksdeutsche militia) and German police. In Petrovgrad, the massacre was oversaw by the police chief Juraj Špiler, a local Nazi collaborator. Some members of the German army also participated in the massacre. In Velika Kikinda, the massacre was attended by SS-Obersturmführer Karl Pamer, while in Banatsko Aranđelovo, army second lieutenant Schuster participated in shooting.

In all five towns, the victims were publicly shot, and their dead bodies were then hanged in public and left hanging for 24 hours, after which they were buried. The executions were attended by local Germans who enjoyed the show. Reith forbade all churches in Banat to ring bells from Friday until Sunday (9–11 January), except in villages inhabited solely by Germans.

== Gallery ==
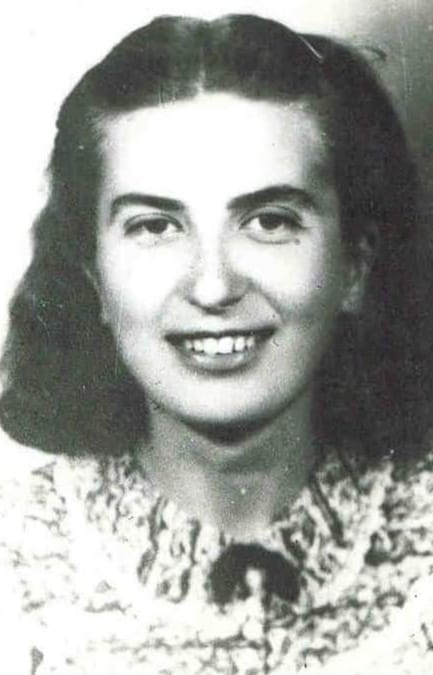
Olga Ubavić, communist activist, one of the executed in Petrovgrad

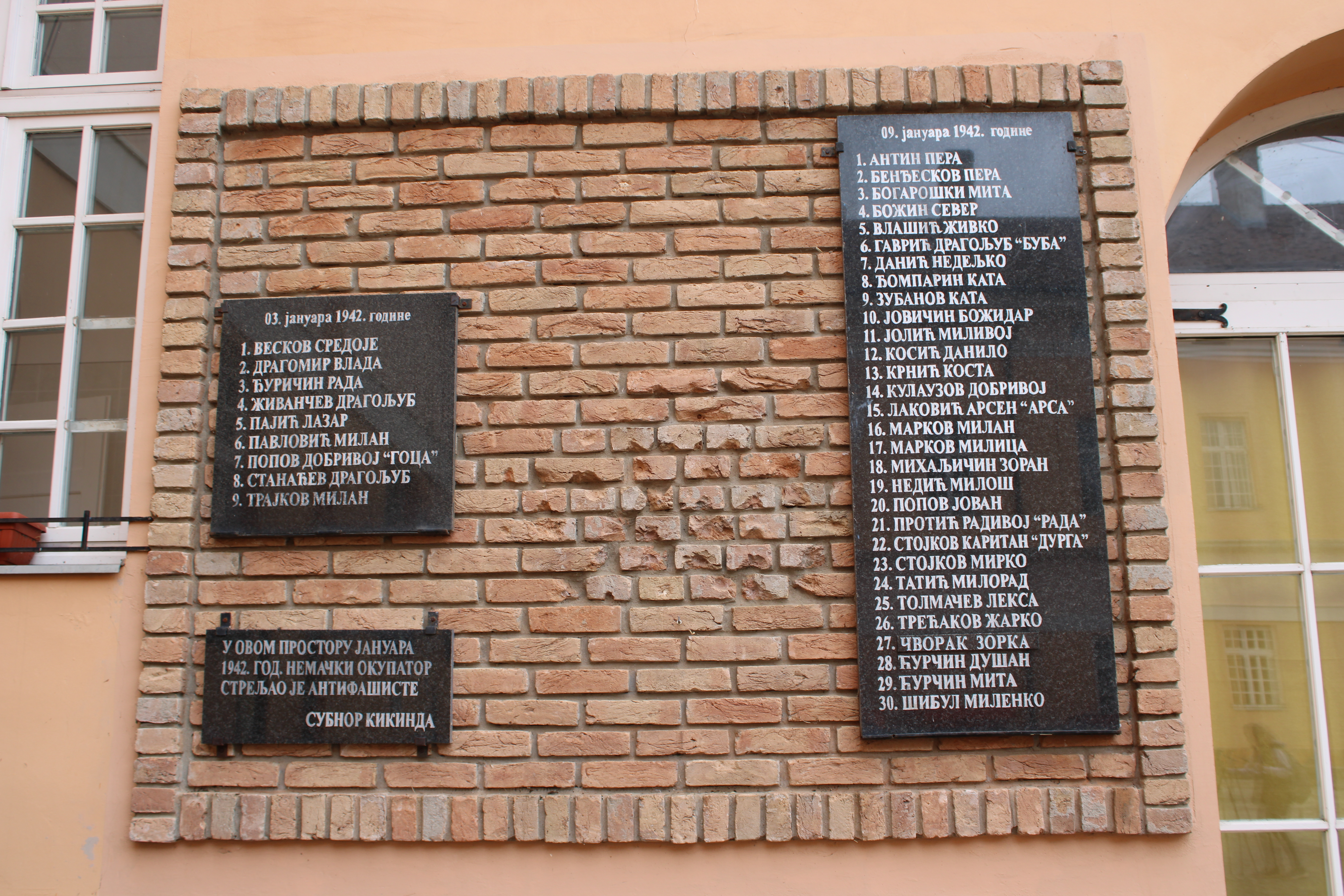
Memorial wall for the 39 executed hostages in Kikinda

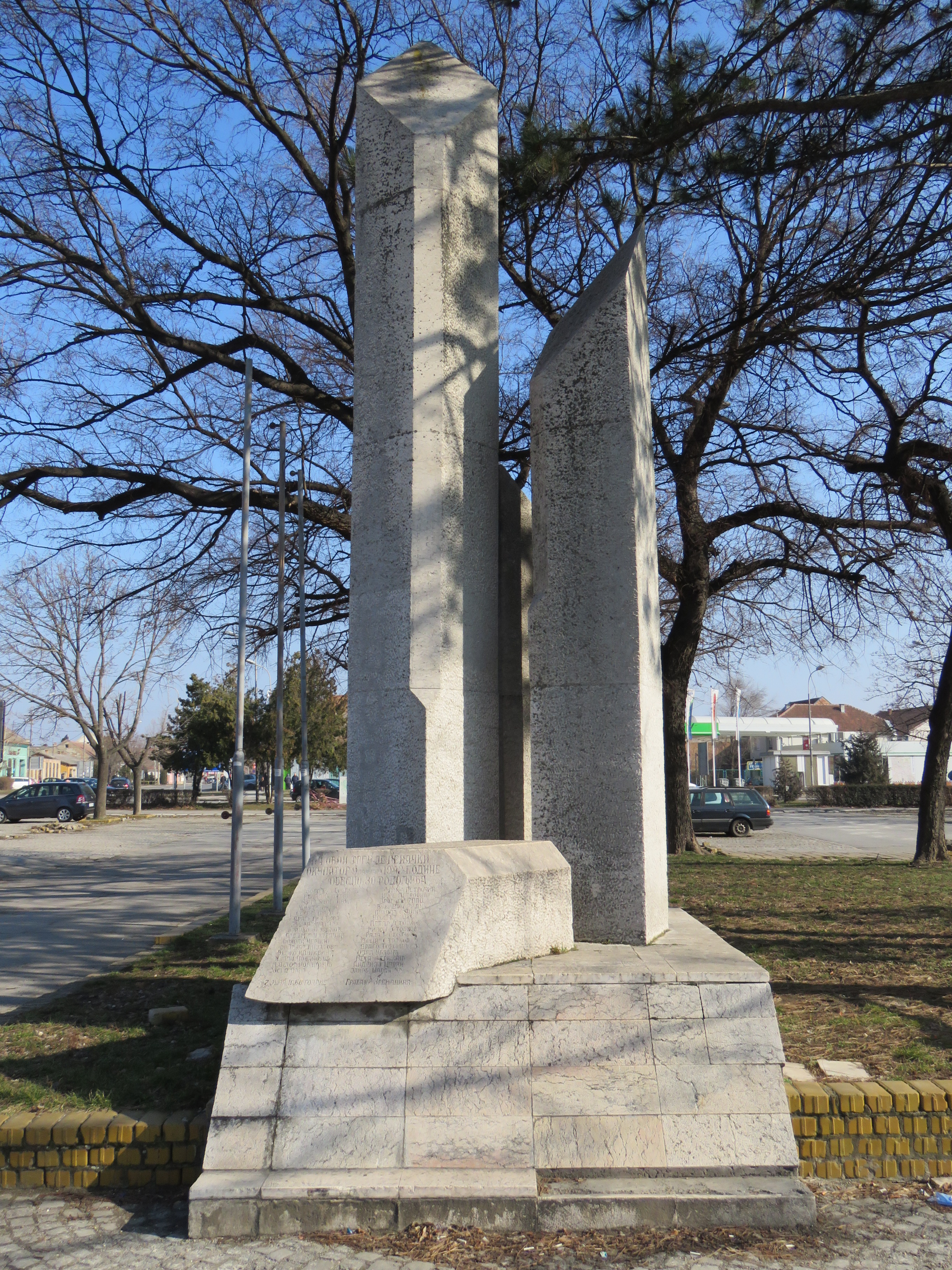
Memorial for the 30 executed hostages in Zrenjanin (former Petrovgrad)

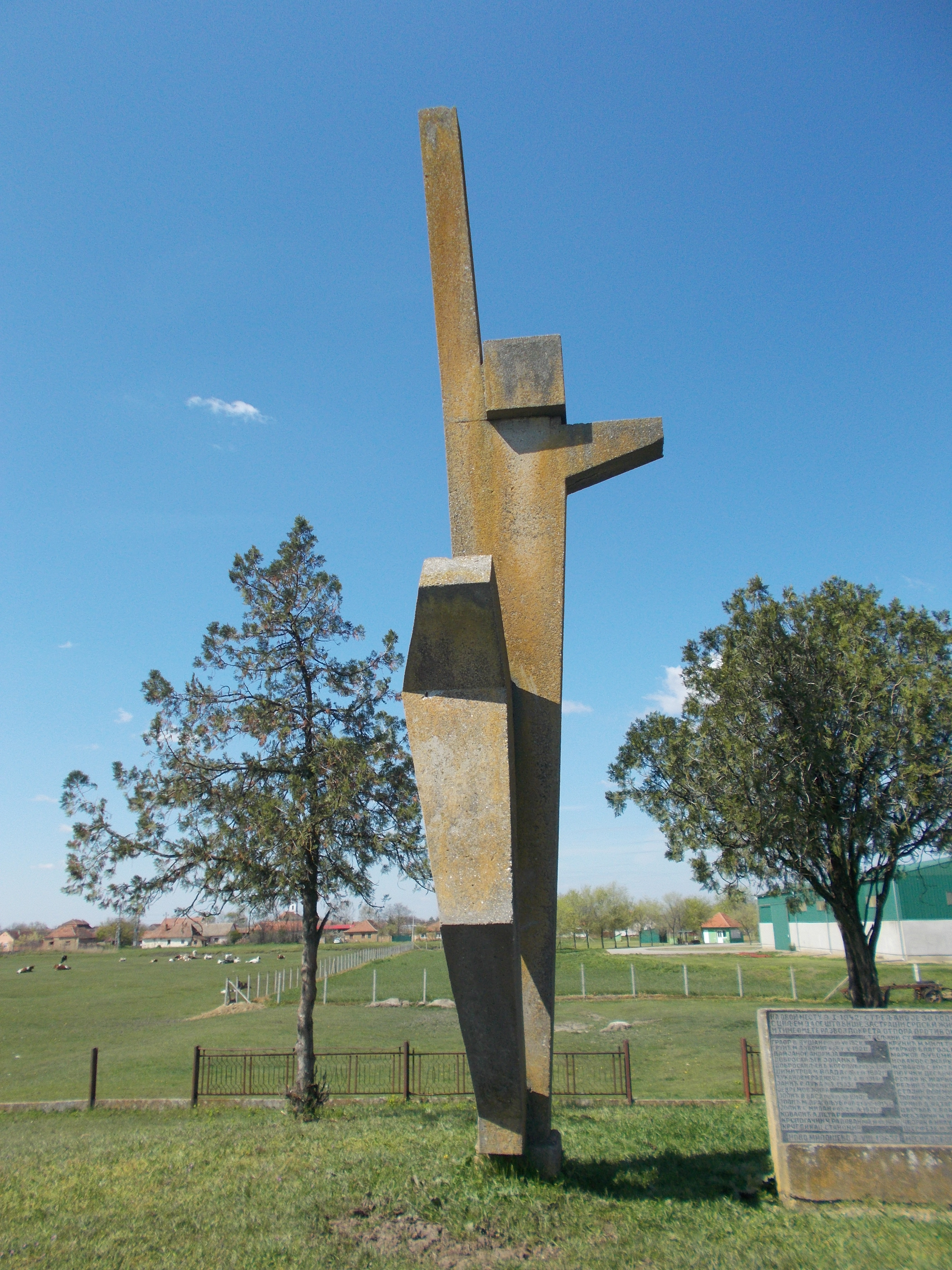
Monument for the 30 executed hostages in Novo Miloševo (former Dragutinovo)

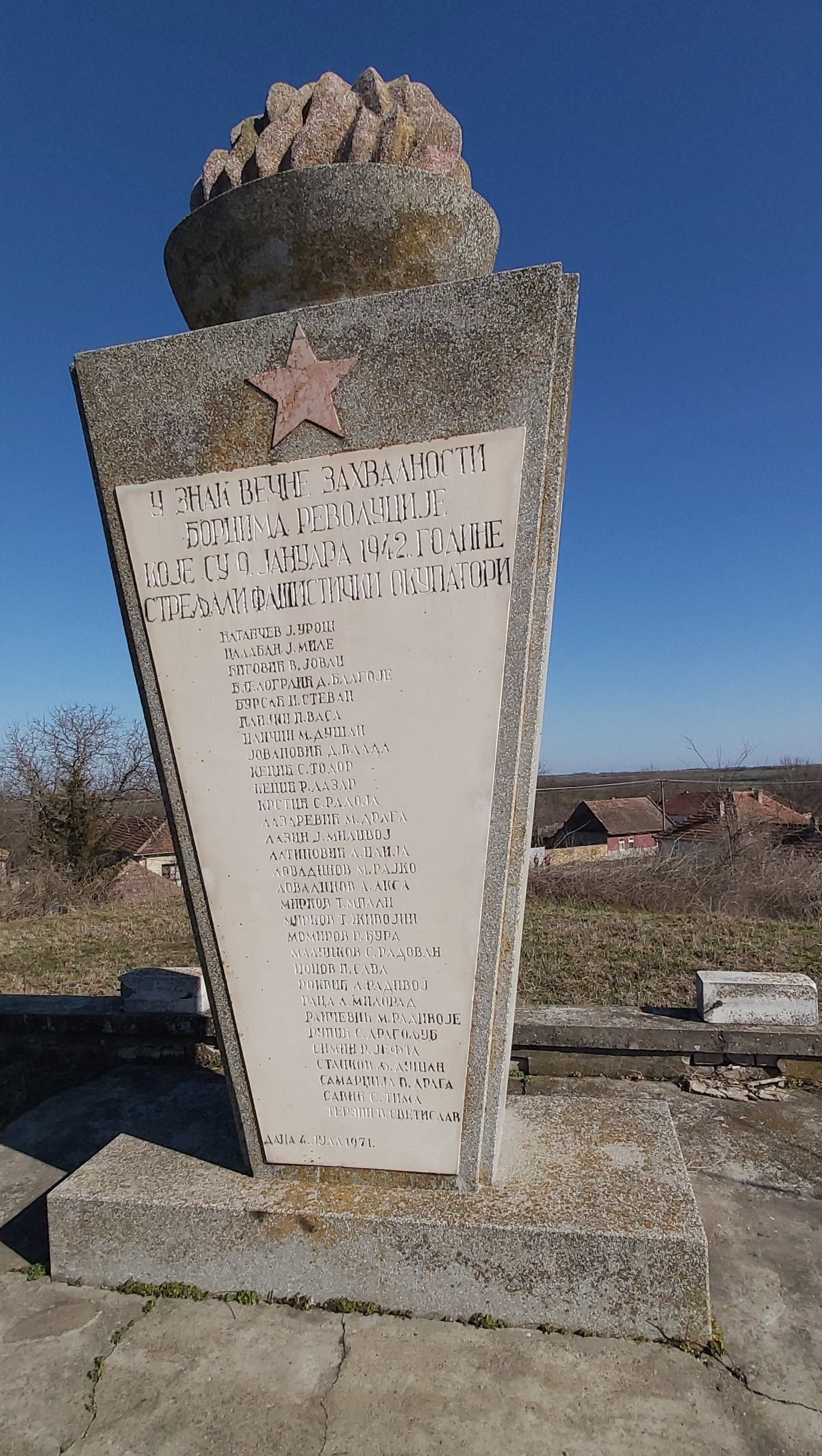
Monument for the 30 executed hostages in Banatsko Aranđelovo

== See also ==
- List of mass executions and massacres in Yugoslavia during World War II
- Novi Sad raid – massacre of civilians in the Bačka region, also in January 1942
