= Blatets =

Blatets refers to the following places:

- Blatets, Kyustendil Province, village in Bulgaria
- Blatets, Sliven Province, village in Bulgaria
- Blatec, Vinica, village in the Republic of Macedonia
