= Marko Orešković =

Yugoslav partisan commander (1895–1941)

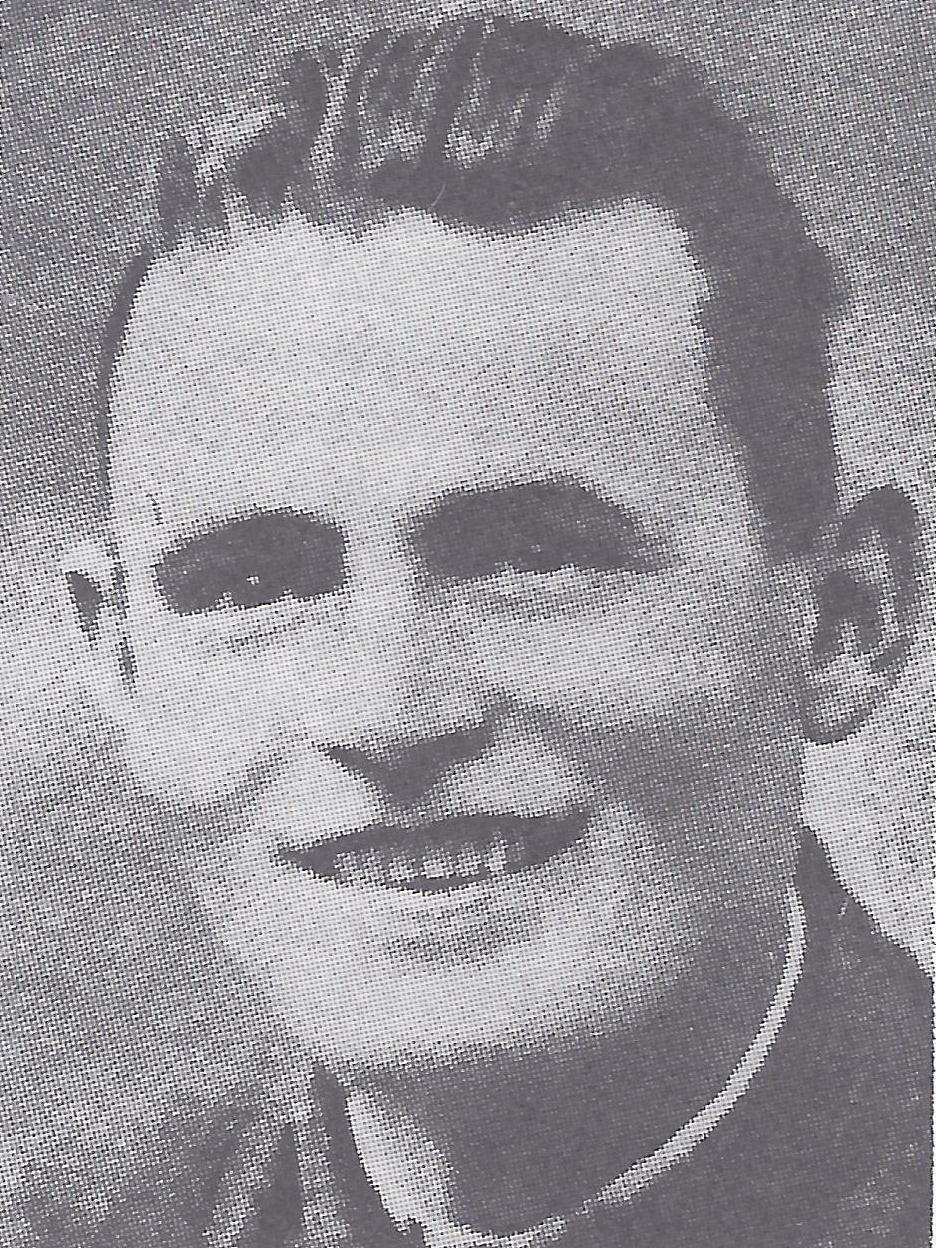
Marko Orešković

Marko Orešković (3 April 1895 – 20 October 1941) was a Croatian and Yugoslav Partisan commander. He was also known by his nickname Krntija.

He was born in Široka Kula, Gospić municipality, which was part of Austria-Hungary at the time. At the age of 15 he left his impoverished home to earn living as a coal miner in Germany. During World War I he was drafted into Austro-Hungarian Navy. In 1918 he was imprisoned for his role in the sailor's mutiny on the battleship SMS Szent István.

In 1925 he became a member of Communist Party of Yugoslavia, and a year later he went to Belgrade. In 1929 he was arrested and tortured by Royal Yugoslav police and later sentenced to five years of prison.

After serving his sentence he went to Spain to fight in Spanish Civil War on Republican side. He served as political commisar of Đuro Đaković battalion of International Brigades. After the end of war in 1939 he returned to Yugoslavia where he was appointed in the Central Committee of the Croatian Communist Party. A year later he took part in 5th National Conference of CPY. Soon afterwards he was arrested by authorities and interned in Lepoglava prison. He managed to escape.

Following the Axis invasion of Yugoslavia and establishment of Independent State of Croatia (NDH), CPY sent Orešković to organise an armed uprising in his native Lika region. The uprising was successful because the local Serb population suffered persecution by new Ustasha regime and Orešković with his war experience soon became one of the most popular commanders.

However, the insurgents were soon split on the issue whether to engage in combat only with NDH or all Axis forces, including the Italians who offered protection from Ustasha atrocities. This faction, who later became known as Chetniks, was opposed by Orešković, an ethnic Croat, who wanted insurgence to cross ethnic lines.

In October 1941 Orešković was named as the first political commissar of the Lika Partisan Detachments, and later he became a member of Supreme HQ of Croatia. But, as he then went to Drvar to conference with other insurgent commanders. On his return he was ambushed and shot by members of a local ethnic Serb village guard squad. After the arrival of Partizans, these thugs that were terrorizing the local village, were caught and since different bits of clothing of Marko Orešković were seen being worn by them, they finally confessed their crime and were shot dead for it.

In 1945 he received the title of People's Hero of Yugoslavia.
