= Melovo =

- Village
- Location within Serbia
- Coordinates: 42°45′52″N 21°46′47″E
- Country: Serbia
- District: Jablanica District
- Municipality: Leskovac

Population (2002)
  - Total: 63
- Time zone: UTC+1 (CET)
  - Summer (DST): UTC+2 (CEST)

Melovo is a village in the municipality of Leskovac, Serbia. According to the 2002 census, the village has a population of 63 people.
