= Pančevo executions =

Killing of Serb civilians in 1941

- Part of World War II in Yugoslavia
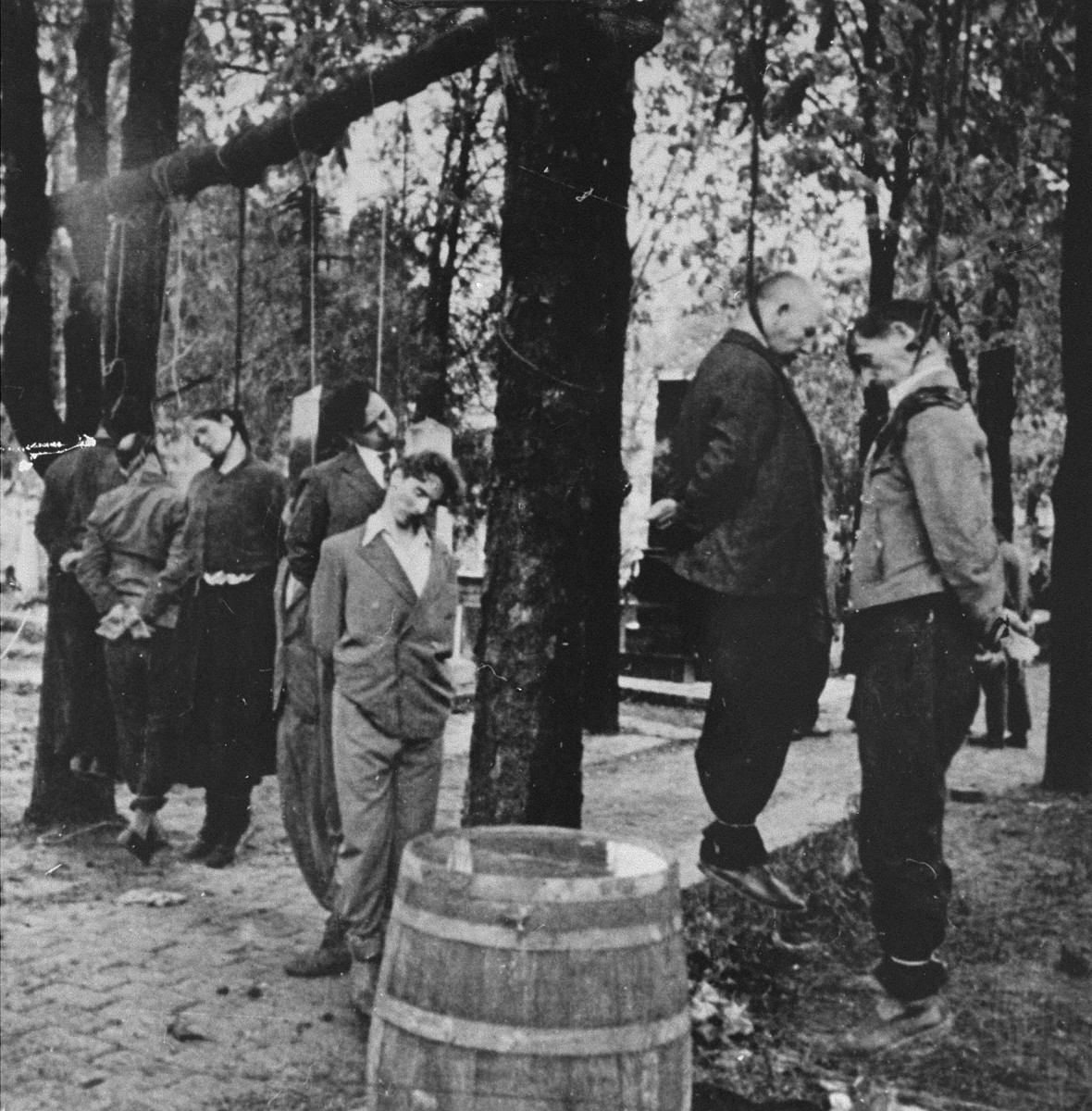
- Serb civilians hanged as part of the Pančevo executions
- Location: 44°52′14″N 20°38′25″E; Pančevo, Banat Territory of the Military Commander in Serbia
- Date: 21–22 April 1941
- Target: Serbs
- Attack type: Summary executions
- Deaths: 36
- Perpetrator: Nazi Germany

The Pančevo executions (Serbo-Croatian Latin: Pokolj u Pančevu; Serbian Cyrillic: Пoкoљ у Панчеву) were the summary execution of 36 Serb civilians in Pančevo from 21 to 22 April 1941, during World War II. The executions were carried out by the German army, in particular elements of the Panzergrenadier Division Großdeutschland, with the assistance of the Waffen SS, in particular elements of the 2nd SS Panzer Division Das Reich. The executions were also supported and facilitated by local Germans, in particular members of the Kulturbund. The executions came about in response to an alleged ambush by local Serbs on elements of the German army. In reality, the ambush was a false-flag operation, orchestrated by the local Germans.

== Background ==
Pančevo is a town on the banks of the Danube, approximately 17 kilometres (11 mi) north east of Belgrade. It had an ethnically mixed population of Serbs and Germans throughout much of its history. Relations between the two ethnic groups was cordial, however when Nazi Germany invaded Yugoslavia on 6 April 1941, relations deteriorated significantly after members of the Kulturbund, a German fascist political organization, acted as a fifth column for invading German forces. During the day on 20 April 1941, the Kulturbund ambushed a column of refugees and Yugoslav army personnel fleeing from Banatsko Novo Selo. The ambush resulted in fifteen individuals being shot. In retaliation, the Yugoslav army shot nine local Germans.

On the evening of 20 April 1941, German forces entered Pančevo and were ambushed by unknown assailants operating from the Serbian cemetery. The German army searched the cemetery and found nothing. The ambush had in fact been a false flag operation, carried out by local Germans.

=== Executions ===
On the morning of 21 April 1941, the German army and Waffen-SS arrested 100 men from various parts of Pančevo as a result of the previous nights ambush. Of the 100, 40 were selected to appear before a military tribunal, which was conducted by the town commander, Lt. Col. Fritz Bandelow of the Panzergrenadier Division Großdeutschland. Following the tribunal, 36 Serbs were sentenced to death by the presiding judge, SS-Sturmbannführer Rudolf Hoffmann. The executions were carried out by members of the German army, with assistance from the Kulturbund and Waffen-SS. Half were executed by hanging while the other half were executed by firing squad. The dead bodies were put on public display for three days following the executions.

== Aftermath ==
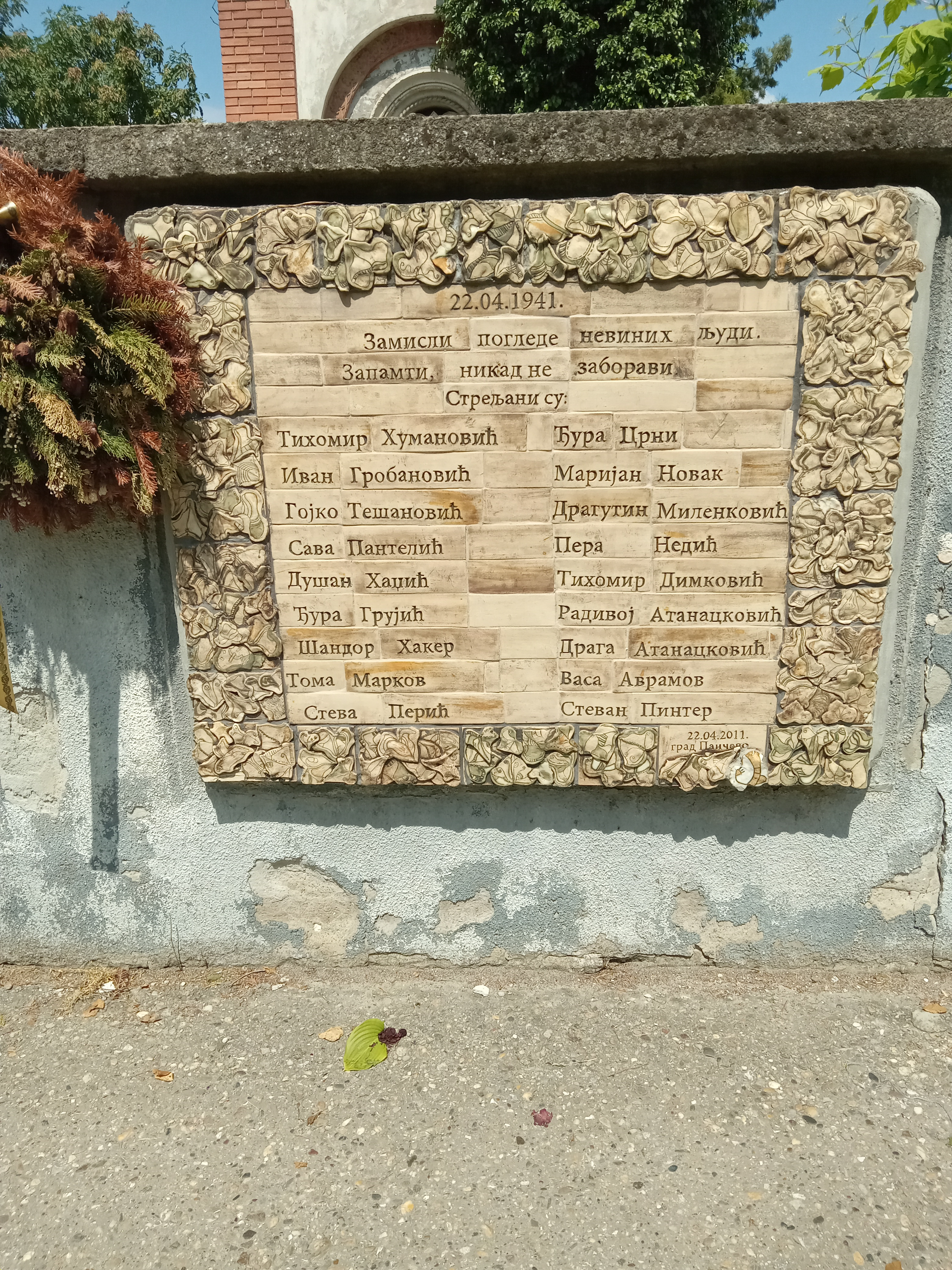
Memorial in Pančevo

Pančevo was liberated by Allied forced as part of the Belgrade offensive in 1944. In January 1945, the remains of the 36 Serb civilians executed were discovered in a mass grave. Forensic evidence noted that the Germans had unearthed the grave and burnt the bones of the victims in an attempt to remove any trace of the execution, prior to their withdrawal.

=== Photos ===
The executions were extensively photographed by the German war photographer, Gerhard Gronefield for the magazine, Signal. In total, fifty images were taken, however Gronefield did not submit the photographs to Signal. It was not until 1963 that some of the photos were published in a book, however it did not elicit any public outcry. The photographs were later exhibited as part of an exhibition titled The war of annihilation. The German news magazine Der Spiegel used the photographs as part of a lead article on War crimes of the Wehrmacht. The article prompted eyewitnesses to the executions to come forward, with many more photos being submitted and circulated. Gerhard was thus not the only photographer on the day, many German soldiers took photos and witnessed the executions as they “‘wanted to see what it was like”.

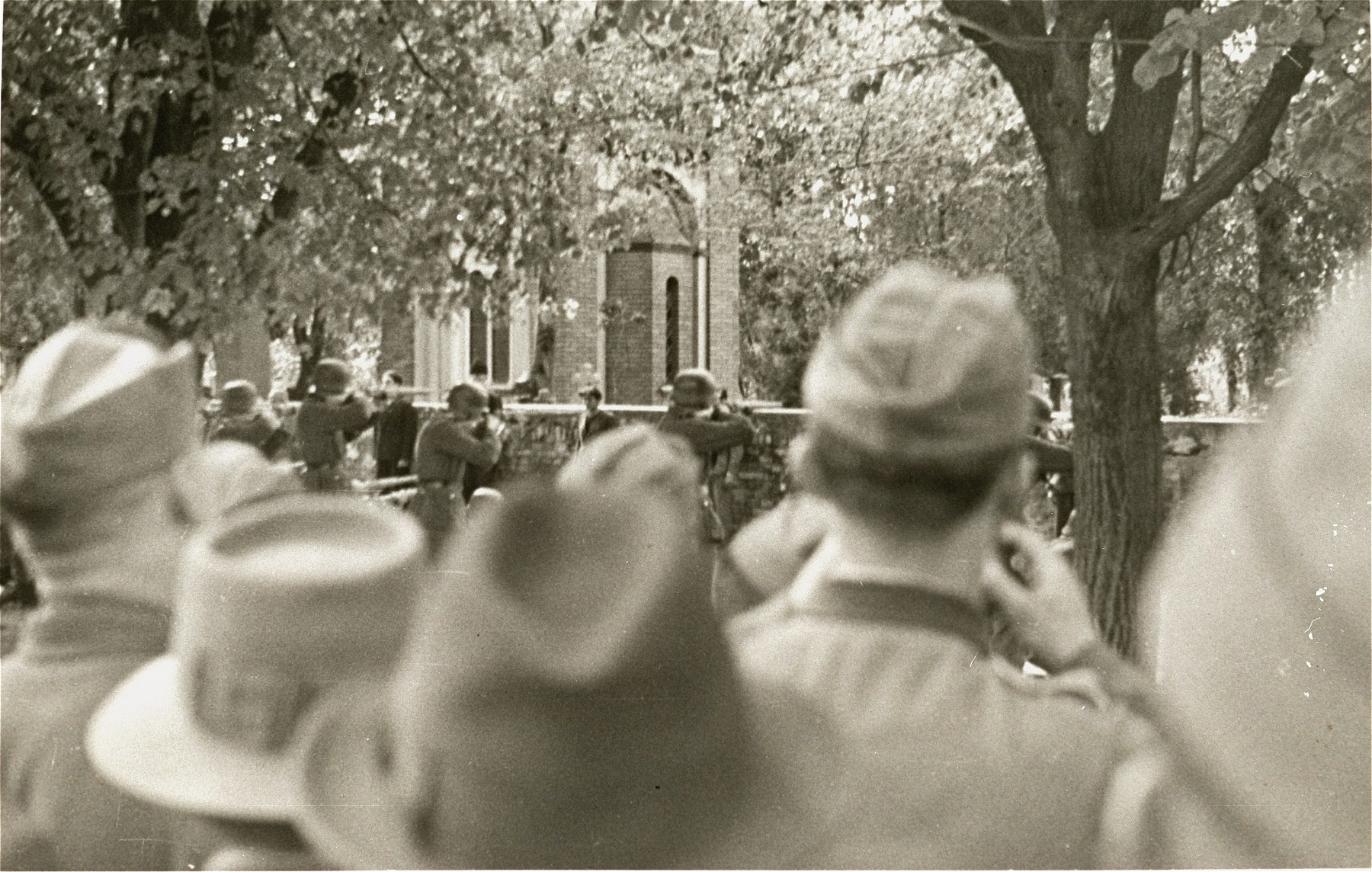
Onlookers watch as the firing squad prepared to open fire

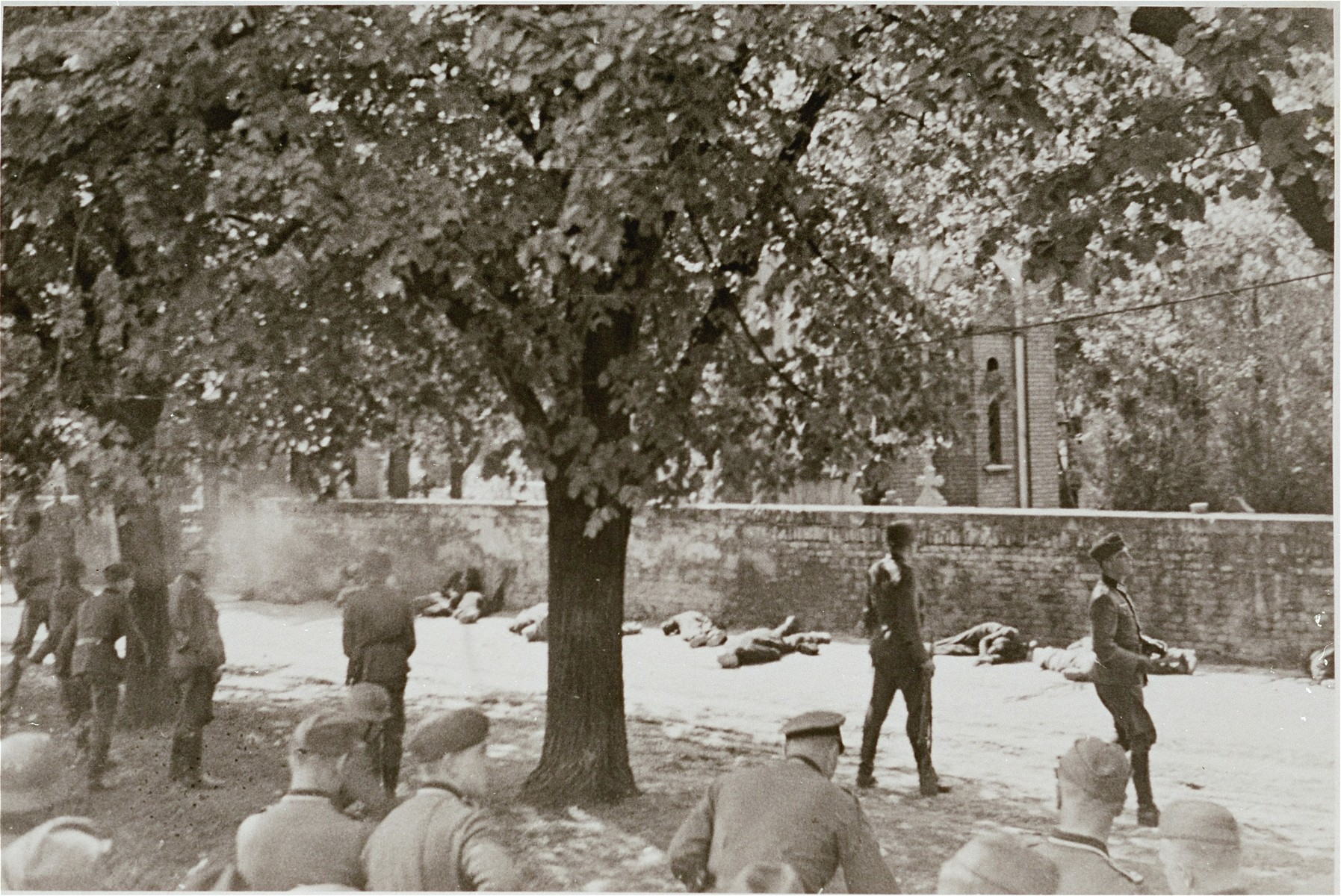
Civilians lay dead after being shot

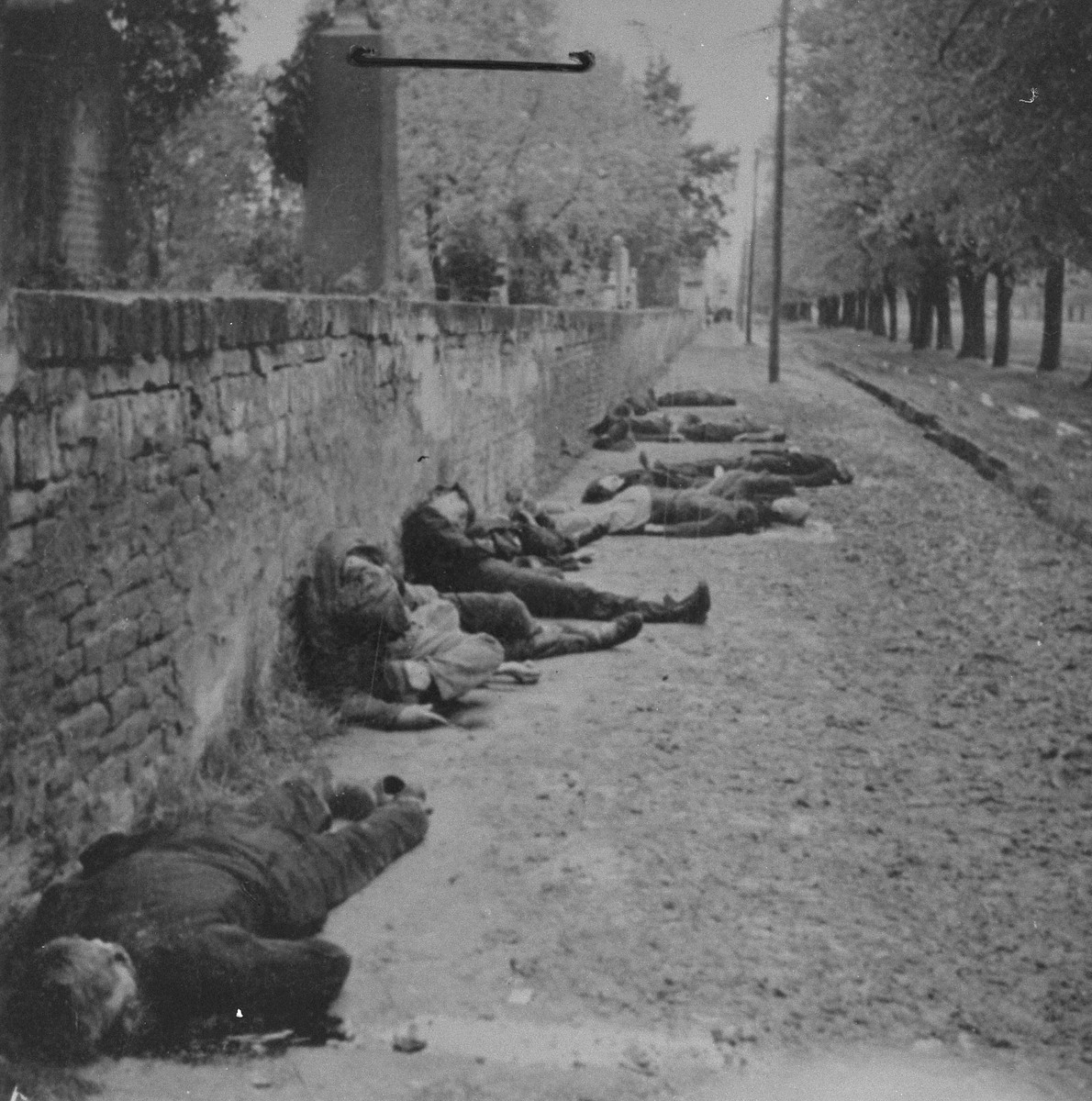
Firing squad victims closeup

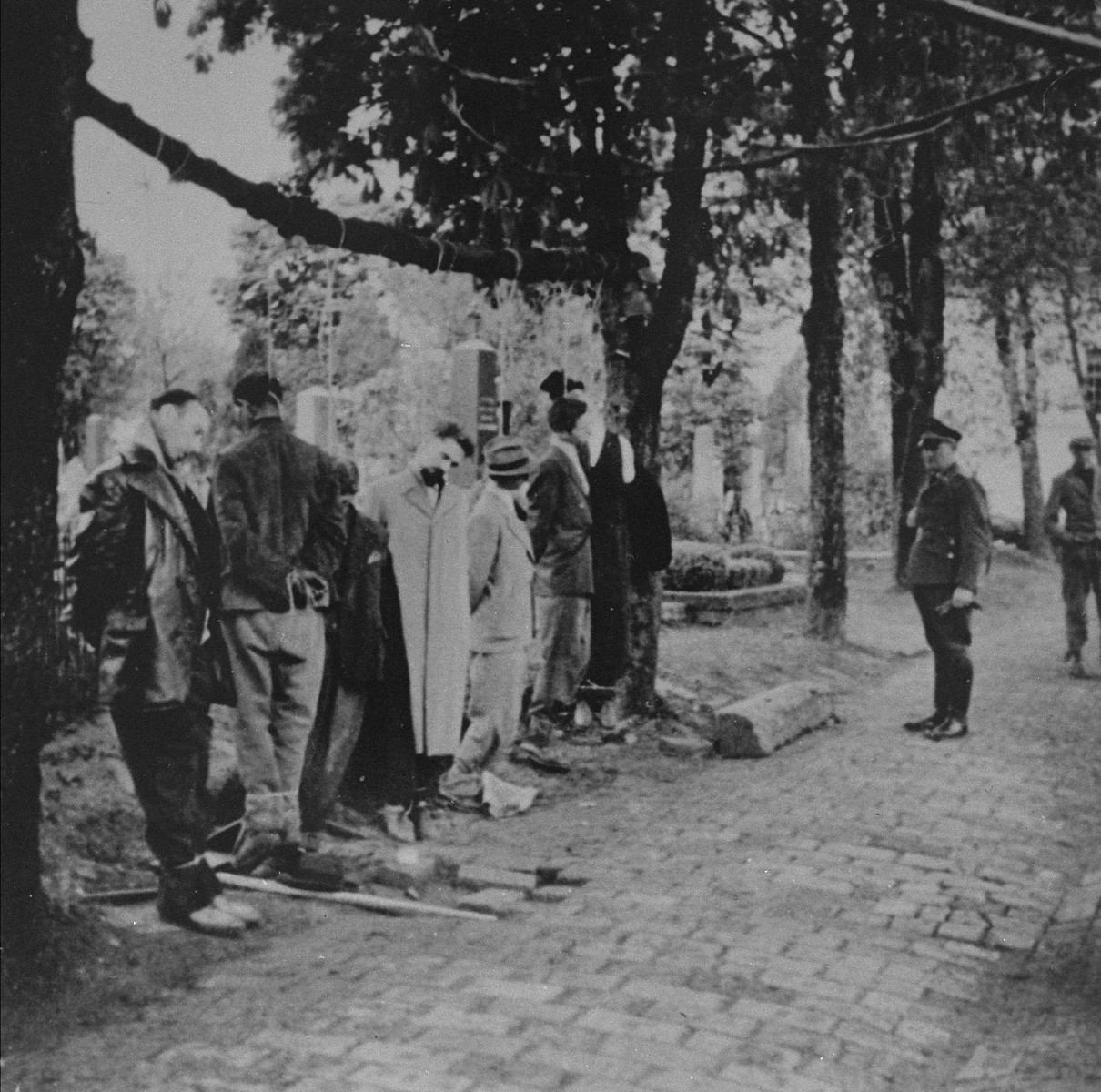
Civilians hanged in the local cemetery

== See also ==
- List of mass executions and massacres in Yugoslavia during World War II

== Bibliography ==
- Ernst, Fischer (2022). Pioneers and Refugees: A Danube Swabian Saga. New York: Archway Publishing. ISBN 978-1-665715164.
- Kay, Alex (2021). Empire of Destruction: A History of Nazi Mass Killing. United Kingdom: Yale University Press. ISBN 978-0300234053.
- Klajn, Lajčo (2007). The Past in Present Times: The Yugoslav Saga. United States of America: University Press of America. ISBN 978-0-7618-3647-6.
- Hamburg Institute for Social Research, ed. (1999). The German Army and Genocide: Crimes Against War Prisoners, Jews, and Other Civilians in the East, 1939-1944. New York: New Press. ISBN 978-1-56584-525-1.
- Bopp, Petra (2016). "A new sensibility? Photographs of violence of Wehrmacht soldiers in the Second World War" (PDF). Przegląd Historyczny. 57: 63–76.
