= Široka Kula =

- Village
- Location of Široka Kula in Croatia
- Coordinates: 44°36′48″N 15°27′17″E
- Country: Croatia
- County: Lika-Senj
- Municipality: Gospić

Area
  - Total: 85.3 km^{2} (32.9 sq mi)

Population (2021)
  - Total: 78
  - Density: 0.91/km^{2} (2.4/sq mi)
- Time zone: UTC+1 (CET)
  - Summer (DST): UTC+2 (CEST)

Široka Kula is a village in the Gospić municipality in the Lika region of central Croatia, Lika-Senj County. It is located near Gospić, connected by the D25 highway.

== History ==
During the WWII Genocide of Serbs by the Croatian fascist Ustaše regime, more than 400 Serbs were massacred in Široka Kula.

In October 1991, during the Croatian War of Independence, Serb forces of the SAO Krajina massacred 41 Croat civilians.

== Demographics ==
Historical population 1857-2011
v

population	2312	2757	2654	2769	3225	3050	3054	2691	957	932	1035	896	658	553	130	116
	1857	1869	1880	1890	1900	1910	1921	1931	1948	1953	1961	1971	1981	1991	2001	2011

Sources: Croatian Bureau of Statistics publications

The 2011 census registered 116 residents.

== See also ==
- Široka Kula massacre

== Notable natives and residents ==
- Marko Orešković (1895–1941) - antifascist Partisan; People's Hero of Yugoslavia

== Sources ==
- Nazor, Ante, ed. (2009). "Zahtjev predsjednika Okružnog suda u Kninu Đure Kresovića MUP-u RSK za mišljenje u vezi s iskapanjem posmrtnih ostatka obitelji Rakić iz jame Golubnjača u kojoj se nalazi i 40-ak leševa osoba hrvatske nacionalnosti ubijenih tijekom 1991." [Request of the Knin District Court President Đuro Kresović to the Ministry of the Interior of the RSK for an Opinion Regarding Exhumation of Remains of Rakić Family from the Golubnjača Pit also Containing Approximately 40 Bodies of Croats Killed in 1991]. Republika Hrvatska i domovinski rat 1990-1995, dokumenti, Knjiga 6 [The Republic of Croatia and the Croatian War of Independence 1990-1995, Volume 6] (PDF) (in Serbian). Hrvatski memorijalno-dokumentacijski centar Domovinskog rata. pp. 322–323. ISBN 978-953-7439-20-0. Archived from the original (PDF) on 2015-09-23.
