= Lipa, Primorje-Gorski Kotar County =

Lipa
- Interactive map of Lipa

Lipa is a village near Matulji, Croatia. In the 2021 census, it had 109 inhabitants.

The Lipa Remembers Memorial Centre is located in the village.
