= Šajini =

Šajini Saini di Barbana
- Village
- Location within Croatia
- Country: Croatia
- County: Istria
- Municipality: Barban

Area
  - Total: 3.6 sq mi (9.2 km^{2})

Population (2021)
  - Total: 175
  - Density: 49/sq mi (19/km^{2})
- Time zone: UTC+1 (CET)
  - Summer (DST): UTC+2 (CEST)
- Postal code: 52207 Barban
- Area code: 052

Sajini (Italian: Saini di Barbana) is a village in the Istria region of Croatia, Barban municipality, approximately 20 km north-east of Pula-Pola.

== Demographics ==
According to the 2021 census, its population was 175.
