= Gračani massacre =

- Location: Gračani, Zagreb, PR Croatia, FPR Yugoslavia (modern-day Croatia)
- Date: May 1945
- Target: HOS prisoners of war and civilians
- Attack type: Mass murder
- Deaths: 295
- Perpetrator: Yugoslav Partisans

The Gračani massacre was the killing of several hundred prisoner of war of the Croatian Armed Forces and civilians in May 1945 in Gračani, a neighborhood of Zagreb, Croatia. The massacre was perpetrated by the Yugoslav Partisans after the end of World War II in Yugoslavia. As of September 2018, bodies of 295 victims were exhumed from the site.

== Mass graves discovery ==
Locations of potential mass graves in the area of Gračani were first researched in 2012. The research was initiated by the Office for Locating, arranging and labelling the graves of the victims of the Communist regime, founded in mid-2011. In October 2012, bodies of thirty victims were excavated from the Krivićev brijeg mass grave in Gračani. The victims were around 18 years old and all had their hands tied with a wire behind their backs. They were probably cadets of the local Pilot School or the Officer School. Two more graves were later located in the Gračani area, increasing the number of exhumed victims to 134. On 15 May 2015, a memorial to the victims of the massacre was unveiled by Speaker of the Croatian Parliament Josip Leko and Minister of Croatian Veterans Predrag Matić.

A new phase of excavations started in April 2018. As of September 2018, the total number of bodies exhumed from seven mass graves in Gračani is 295.
