= Syrmia massacre =

Mass killing in August 1942

- Location: Syrmia
- Date: August–September 1942
- Target: Serbs
- Attack type: Mass murder
- Deaths: 3,000-7,000
- Perpetrators: Ustaše; Nazi Germany

The Syrmia massacre was the mass killing of between 3,000 and 7,000 Serbs in early August 1942 in the region of Syrmia during World War II. The massacre occurred following a joint military anti-partisan operation by units of the Ustaše and the German Wehrmacht.

== Background and prelude ==
On 6 April 1941, the Axis powers, consisting of German, Italian, Hungarian and Bulgarian forces invaded Yugoslavia from all sides. Following the capitulation of the Royal Yugoslav government, the Independent State of Croatia (NDH), a German Nazi puppet-state covering most of the territories of Croatia and Bosnia and Herzegovina, led by Ante Pavelić and his Croatian fascist ultranationalist Ustaše political movement was established. In accordance with Italian and German Nazi policies, racial laws were introduced against the NDH's minority populations, which included the formation of concentration camps. While the Germans were content with the persecution of Jews and Gypsies, they were less enthusiastic about the regime's genocide campaign against Serbs as it drove Serbs to rebel and join Josip Broz Tito's multi-ethnic Yugoslav Partisan resistance movement, thus jeopardizing the stability of the NDH.

Syrmia, a region which lies between the Danube and Sava rivers was formerly a borderland of the Austro-Hungarian empire. Although the German administration was anti-communist and resorted to violence, they were not interested in the persecution of Serbs and thus, Serbs were not targeted as part of Germany's European wide genocidal policies. Thus, Ustaše terror against Serbs was comparatively limited to within the territories of the occupied Yugoslavia. However, by the spring of 1942, the Partisans established detachments in the Fruška Gora mountains, raiding the lowlands and by the middle of the summer they expanded their detachments. Seeking to disrupt Ustaše rule and the German war effort, they raided and shot soldiers or police officers and sabotaged railroad lines. They also induced a shortage of harvest among the peasantry causing famine. Ustaše violence increased and the calls for a united Axis offensive against the Partisans grew. Viktor Tomić was appointed as the Ustaše police commissar in Syrmia and in coordination with local Ustaše units, raided Serb villages.

== The killings ==
Ustaše youth and militia began arresting Serb civilians. Entire male populations from villages were taken away. Approximately 3,000-4,000 predominantly males were arrested and taken to the main prison in Mitrovica. The prisoners were subjected to interrogations, beatings, torture and sometimes rape. Additional arrested Serbs were taken to the nearest detention camps.

Many of the Serb hostages were sentenced to death and the majority wound up being shot by the Ustaše militia, regardless of their political affiliation. The largest single massacre occurred on the night of 4–5 September 1942 when more than a thousand prisoners were taken to the Orthodox cemetery of Mitrovica. Some Ustaše began stabbing prisoners and killings ensued. The massacre ended sometime in the early morning and bodies were dumped in mass graves which had been dug by other captured Serbs.

Most sources list the number of Serbs killed to be 2,000-3,000 while the German Wehrmacht lists up to 7,000 victims for the period of August to early September 1942. Several hundred prisoners were also taken to the Jasenovac concentration camp. The German military described the massacres as "slaughter and sadistic riots".

== Aftermath ==
The attitudes towards the shootings highlighted the differences between the Wehrmacht and Ustaše. Whereas the Ustaše applied violence indiscriminately, the Wehrmacht enacted reprisal shootings according to the German code of conduct set out by Heinrich Himmler. Mass killings of suspected Partisans were deemed useful but they felt that the Ustaše's approach was counterproductive.

== Sources ==
- Goldstein, Ivo (2014). Pinto, Antonio Costa; Eatwell, Roger; Larsen, Stein Ugelvik (eds.). Charisma and Fascism. Routledge. ISBN 9781317834533.
- Korb, Alexander (2010). Shepherd, Ben; Pattinson, Juliette (eds.). War in a Twilight World: Partisan and Anti-Partisan Warfare in Eastern Europe, 1939-45. Springer. ISBN 9780230290488.
