= Koraj massacre =

1941 Mass murder in Yugoslavia

- Part of World War II
- Location: Koraj near Brčko, Bosnia and Herzegovina
- Date: 28 November 1941 (Central European Time)
- Target: Bosnian Muslims
- Attack type: Mass killing
- Deaths: more than 100
- Perpetrator: Serbian Chetniks

The Koraj massacre was the 28 November 1941 mass murder of over a hundred Bosnian Muslim peasants from the village Koraj near Brčko by Serbian Chetniks. The massacre was in response to the 1941 anti-Communist Tuzla Rebellion.
