= Blatec, Vinica =

Blatec Блатец
- Village
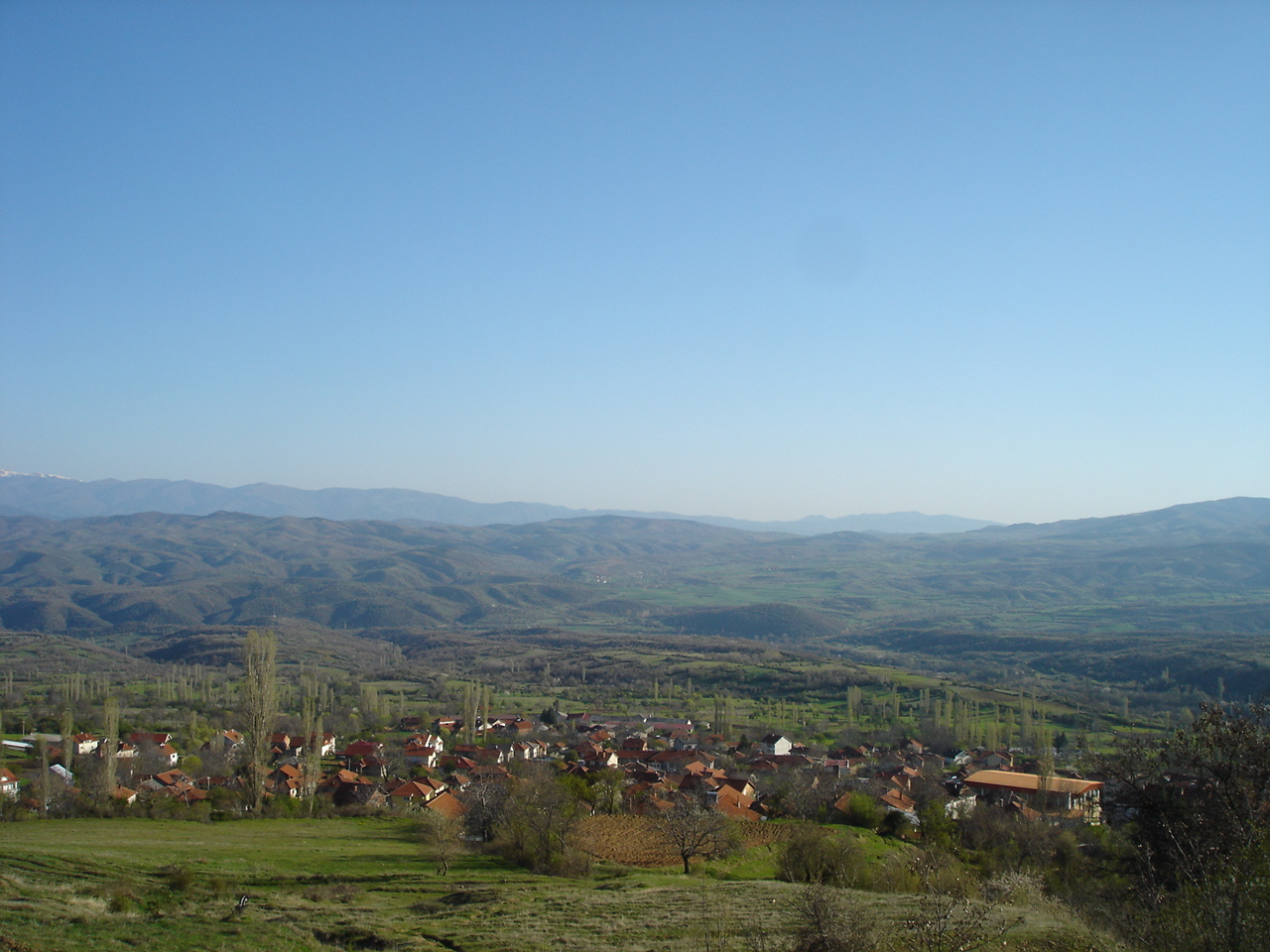
- View of the village

- Location within North Macedonia
- Coordinates: 41.836824°N 22.578260°E
- Country: North Macedonia
- Region: Eastern
- Municipality: Vinica

Population (2002)
  - Total: 1,594
- Time zone: UTC+1 (CET)
  - Summer (DST): UTC+2 (CEST)
- Website: .

Blatec (Macedonian: Блатец) is a village in the municipality of Vinica, North Macedonia. It used to be a municipality of its own.

== Demographics ==
According to the 2002 census, the village had a total of 1,594 inhabitants. Ethnic groups in the village include:

- Macedonians 1,587
- Serbs 7
