= Banatsko Aranđelovo =

Banatsko Aranđelovo Банатско Аранђелово (Serbian)
- Village (Selo)
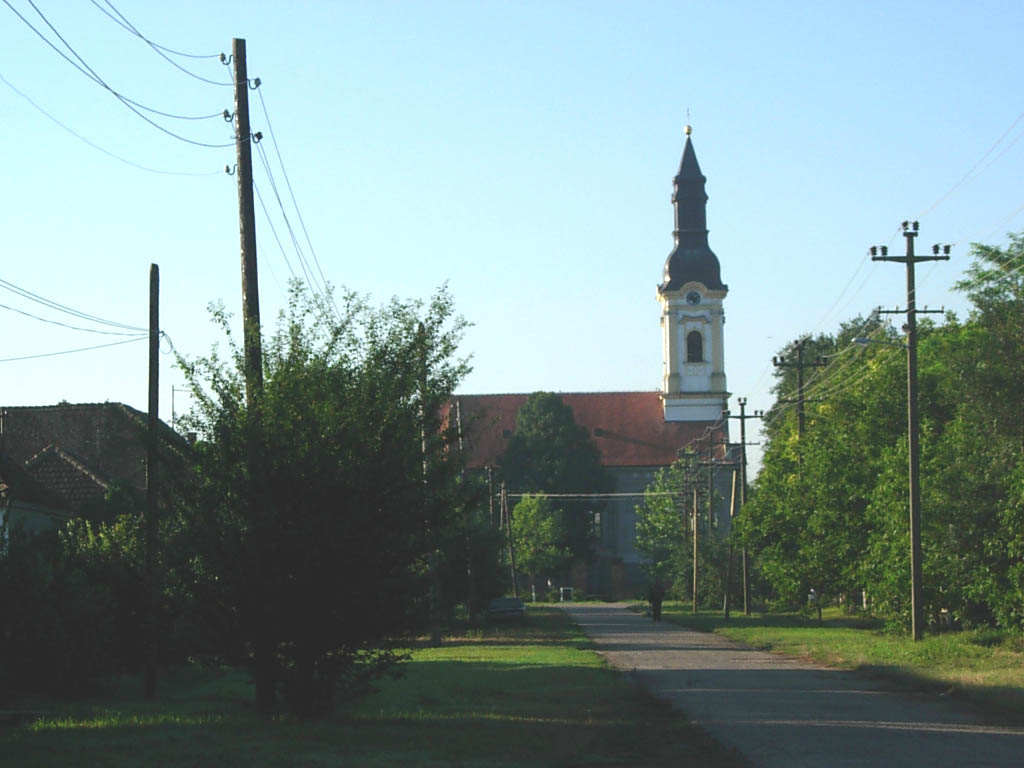
- The Orthodox Church

- Location of Vojvoda Zimonić within Serbia Banatsko Aranđelovo (Serbia) Banatsko Aranđelovo (Europe)
- Coordinates: 46°03′51.59″N 20°14′36.46″E
- Country: Serbia
- Province: Vojvodina
- District: North Banat
- Municipalities: Novi Kneževac
- Elevation: 77 m (253 ft)

Population (2002)
  - Banatsko Aranđelovo: 1,718
- Time zone: UTC+1 (CET)
  - Summer (DST): UTC+2 (CEST)
- Postal code: 23332
- Area code: +381(0)230
- Car plates: KI

Banatsko Aranđelovo (Serbian Cyrillic: Банатско Аранђелово) is a village located in the Novi Kneževac municipality, in the North Banat District of Serbia. It is situated in the Autonomous Province of Vojvodina. The village has a Serb ethnic majority (53.08%) with a present Hungarian (26.54%) and Romani minority (15.13%). It has a population of 1,718 people (2002 census).

== Name ==
In Serbian, the village is known as Banatsko Aranđelovo or Банатско Аранђелово (formerly also Oroslamoš / Оросламош), in Hungarian as Oroszlámos, and in Croatian as Banatsko Aranđelovo. Current village name comes from words "Banat" and "saint archangel Gabriel" ("arhangel Gavrilo" or simply "Aranđel" in Serbian) and means "the place of saint archangel Gabriel in Banat".

== Historical population ==
- 1961: 3,700
- 1971: 3,144
- 1981: 2,245
- 1991: 1,912

== See also ==
- List of places in Serbia
- List of cities, towns and villages in Vojvodina
