= Blagaj massacre =

Massacre of Serbs by the Ustaše in Croatia during World War II

Coordinates: 45°21′N 15°54′E

- Part of the Genocide of Serbs in the Independent State of Croatia
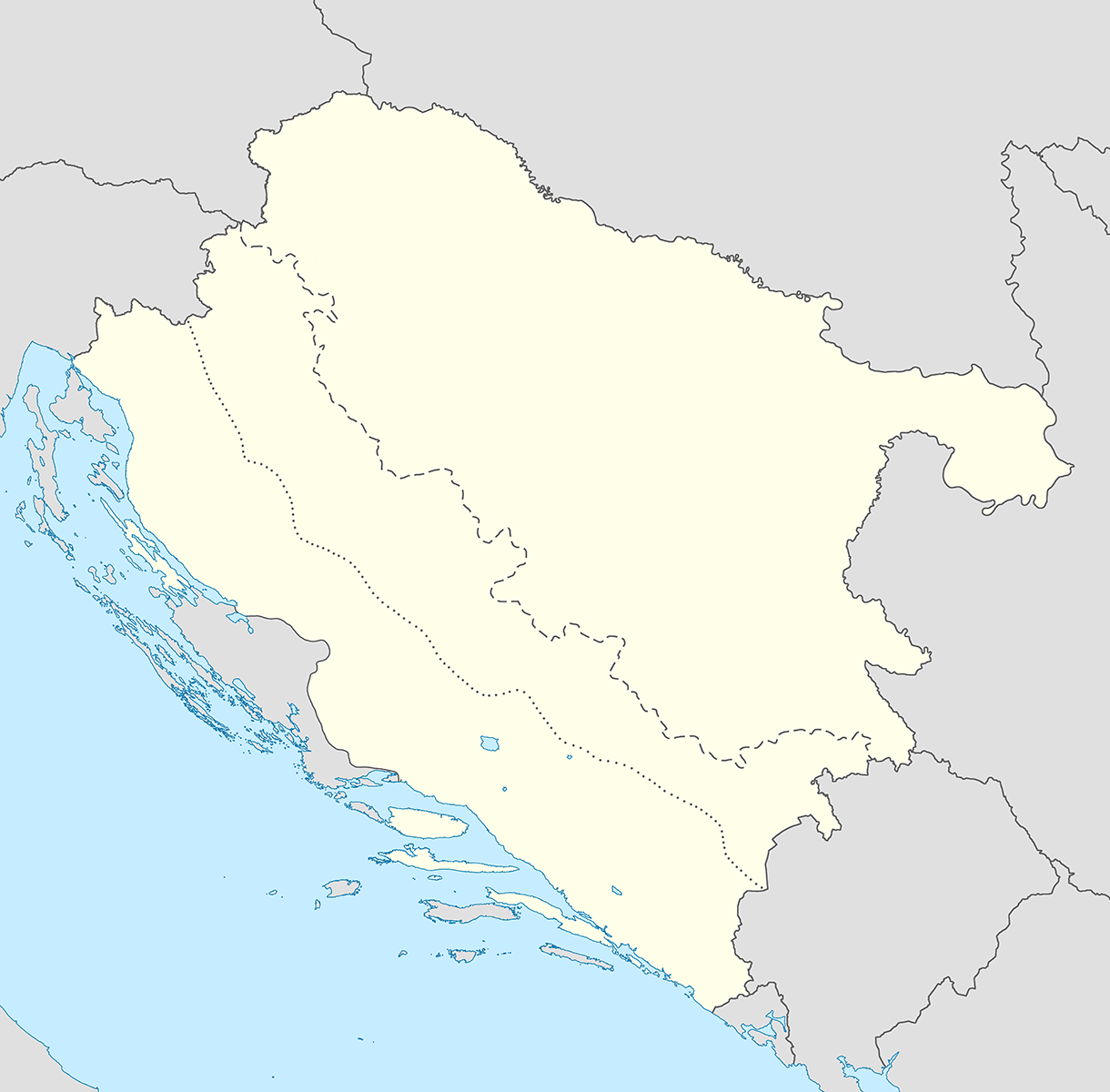
- A map showing the location of Blagaj within the NDH
- Location: Blagaj, Independent State of Croatia
- Date: 9 May 1941
- Target: Serbs
- Attack type: Summary executions
- Deaths: c. 400
- Perpetrator: Ustaše

The Blagaj massacre was the mass killing of around 400 Serb civilians by the Croatian nationalist Ustaše movement on 9 May 1941, during World War II. The massacre occurred shortly after the German-led Axis invasion of Yugoslavia and the establishment of the Ustaše-led Axis puppet state known as the Independent State of Croatia (NDH). It was the second act of mass murder committed by the Ustaše upon coming to power and was part of a wider campaign of genocide against Serbs in the NDH that would last until the end of the war.

The victims were drawn from the village of Veljun and its surroundings, ostensibly for their involvement in the robbery and murder of a local Croat Catholic miller, Joso Mravunac, and his family. The Ustaše claimed that the murders were ethnically motivated and signalled the start of a regional Serb uprising. Following their arrests, the prisoners were detained in a Blagaj school, where many were beaten and tortured. The Ustaše intended to organize a mass trial of the men under the auspices of a "people's court". These plans fell apart after Mravunac's surviving daughter was unable to identify perpetrators from a police lineup and prosecutors declined to launch proceedings against any individual without evidence of their guilt. Dissatisfied, Vjekoslav Luburić, a senior Ustaše official, arranged for the creation of a new "special court" and appointed a prosecutor that was unwilling to let the lack of evidence hinder a conviction. The following day, the surviving Mravunac daughter allegedly identified one of the prisoners from a police lineup as being one of the perpetrators of the crime. This constituted sufficient reason to have 32 or 36 of the prisoners sentenced to death. The Ustaše went further and executed all of the men in their custody in a pit behind the Blagaj school, burying their bodies in a mass grave, which was subsequently covered with crops.

Following the massacre, the female relatives of the victims visited Blagaj carrying baskets of food for the prisoners, but were told the men had been sent away to Germany. After three months, a local Ustaše official captured by the Partisans admitted that the prisoners had in fact been killed. Memories of the massacre fostered animosity between the residents of Blagaj and Veljun that have lasted for decades. During the 1991–1995 war in Croatia, fought amid the breakup of Yugoslavia, the residents of the two communities destroyed and plundered each other's villages, and forcibly displaced one another. The inhabitants of the two villages began returning to the region after the war, but tensions persisted, and an attempt to commemorate the massacre in May 1999 resulted in the socialist-era monument to the victims being desecrated. Annual commemorations have since resumed.

== Background ==
=== Inter-war period ===
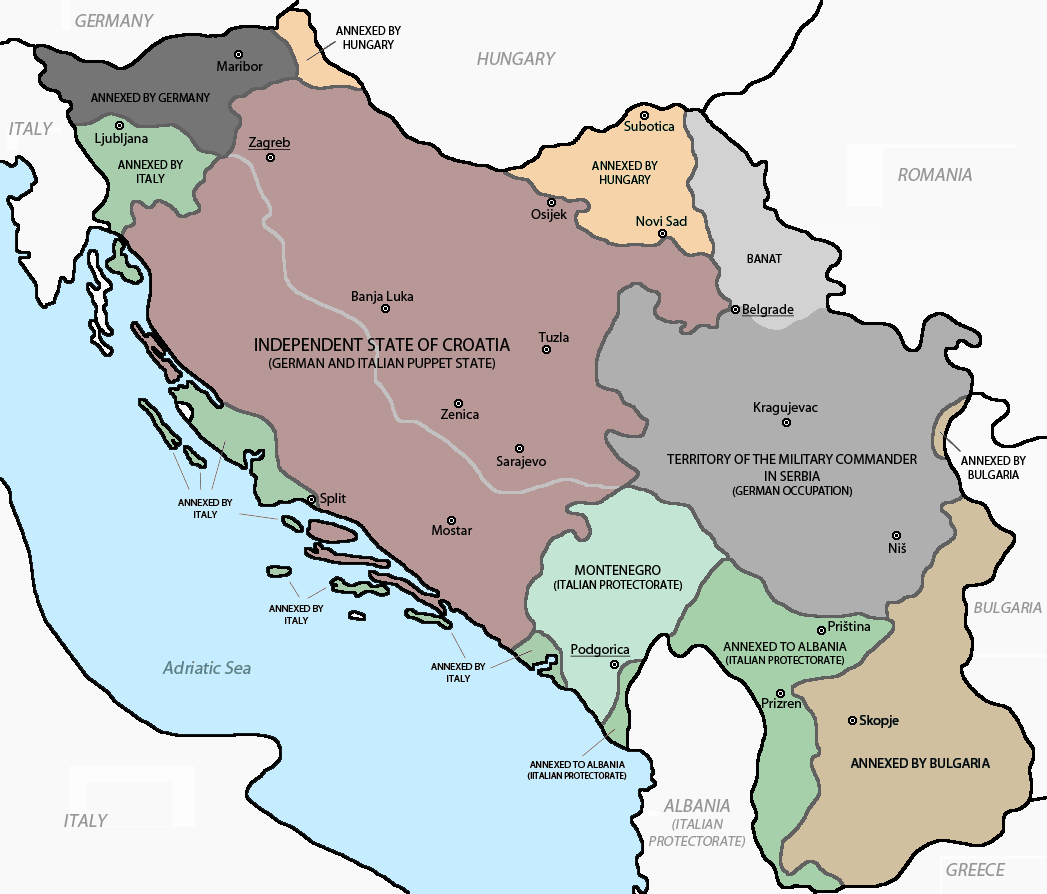
The occupation and partition of Yugoslavia, 1941–1943

The Kingdom of Serbs, Croats and Slovenes was formed in the immediate aftermath of World War I. It was composed of six million Serbs, 3.5 million Croats and one million Slovenes, among others. Being the largest ethnic group, the Serbs favoured a centralized state. Croats, Slovenes and Bosnian Muslims did not. The so-called Vidovdan Constitution, approved on 28 June 1921 and based on the Serbian constitution of 1903, established the Kingdom as a parliamentary monarchy under the Serbian Karađorđević dynasty. Belgrade was chosen as the capital of the new state, assuring Serb and Orthodox Christian political dominance. In 1928, the prominent Croatian politician Stjepan Radić was shot and mortally wounded on the floor of the country's parliament by a Serb deputy. The following year, King Alexander instated a royal dictatorship and renamed the country Yugoslavia to deemphasize its ethnic makeup. It was divided into nine administrative units called banates (Serbo-Croatian: banovine), six of which had ethnic Serb majorities. In 1931, Alexander issued a decree which allowed the Yugoslav Parliament to reconvene on the condition that only pro-Yugoslav parties be represented in it. Marginalized, far-right and far-left parties thrived. The Ustaše, a Croatian fascist movement, emerged as the most extreme of these. The Ustaše were driven by a profound hatred of Serbs. In 1932, they launched the Velebit uprising, attacking a police station in Lika. The police responded harshly to the attack and harassed the local population, leading to further animosity between Croats and Serbs. In 1934, an Ustaše-trained assassin killed Alexander while he was on a state visit to France. Alexander's cousin, Prince Paul, became regent and took up the king's responsibilities until Alexander's son Peter turned 18.

Following the 1938 Anschluss between Germany and Austria, Yugoslavia came to share its northwestern border with the Third Reich and fell under increasing pressure as her neighbours aligned themselves with the Axis powers. In April 1939, Italy opened a second frontier with Yugoslavia when it invaded and occupied neighbouring Albania. At the outbreak of World War II, the Yugoslav government declared its neutrality. Between September and November 1940, Hungary and Romania joined the Tripartite Pact, aligning themselves with the Axis, and Italy invaded Greece. From that time, Yugoslavia was almost completely surrounded by the Axis powers and their satellites, and her neutral stance toward the war became strained. In late February 1941, Bulgaria joined the Pact. The following day, German troops entered Bulgaria from Romania, closing the ring around Yugoslavia. Intending to secure his southern flank for the impending attack on the Soviet Union, Adolf Hitler began placing heavy pressure on Yugoslavia to join the Axis. On 25 March 1941, after some delay, the Yugoslav government conditionally signed the Pact. Two days later, a group of pro-Western, Serbian nationalist Royal Yugoslav Air Force officers deposed the country's regent, Prince Paul, in a bloodless coup d'état, placed his teenaged nephew Peter on the throne, and brought to power a "government of national unity" led by General Dušan Simović. The coup enraged Hitler, who immediately ordered the country's invasion, which commenced on 6 April 1941.

=== Creation of the NDH ===
The Royal Yugoslav Army (Vojska Kraljevine Jugoslavije, VKJ) was quickly overwhelmed by the combined German, Italian and Hungarian assault. Much of its equipment was obsolete, its military strategy was outdated and its soldiers were ill-disciplined and poorly trained. To make matters worse, many of the VKJ's non-Serb personnel, especially Croats, were reluctant to fight against the Germans, whom they considered liberators from decades of Serb oppression. On 10 April, senior Ustaše leader Slavko Kvaternik proclaimed the establishment of the Independent State of Croatia (Nezavisna Država Hrvatska, NDH). The declaration came exactly one week before the VKJ's unconditional surrender to the Axis powers. The leader of the Ustaše, Ante Pavelić, was in Rome at the time and made arrangements to travel to Karlovac, just west of Zagreb. He arrived in Karlovac on 13 April, accompanied by several hundred of his followers. On 15 April, Pavelić reached Zagreb, having granted territorial cessions to Italy at Croatia's expense and promised the Germans that he had no intention of pursuing a foreign policy independent of Berlin. That same day, Germany and Italy extended diplomatic recognition to the NDH. Pavelić declared himself the Poglavnik ("leader") of the Ustaše-led Croatian state, which was to include much of present-day Croatia, all of present-day Bosnia and Herzegovina and parts of present-day Serbia. On 17 April, the Yugoslav Supreme Command capitulated to the Axis powers. The country was subsequently dismembered, and occupied by Germany and its allies.

Pavelić and his followers intended to create an "ethnically pure" Croatia through the mass murder and deportation of Serbs, Jews and other non-Croats. At the time, Croats only made up about 50 percent of the NDH's population of 6.5 million. Nearly two million Serbs, about one-third of the NDH's total population, now found themselves within the borders of the newly formed state. Serb-majority areas also covered between 60 and 70 percent of the NDH's total landmass. "The Croatian state cannot exist if 1.8 million Serbs are living in it and if we have a powerful Serbian state at our backs," Croatia's future Foreign Minister Mladen Lorković explained. "Therefore, we are trying to make the Serbs disappear from our regions." On 28 April, the Ustaše massacred nearly 200 Serb civilians in the village of Gudovac, their first act of mass murder upon coming to power.

== Prelude ==
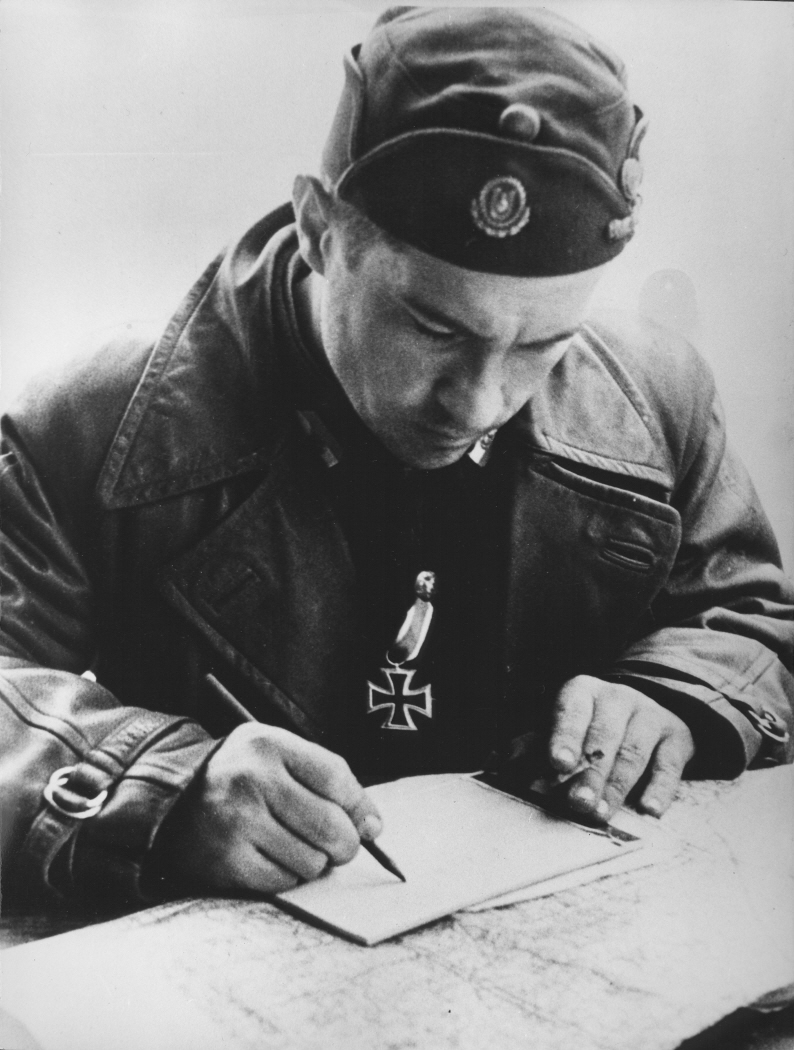
Vjekoslav Luburić

Blagaj is a village in the Kordun region, about 30 kilometres (19 mi) south of Karlovac. It is predominantly inhabited by ethnic Croats. On the evening of 5 May 1941, two unidentified men forced their way into the home of a local miller, a Catholic Croat named Joso Mravunac. They first robbed the family and then killed Mravunac, his wife, his mother and two of his children. Mravunac's 12-year-old daughter Milka escaped by jumping into a nearby river. The following day, investigative judge Nikola Lasić and county commissioner Eduard Lenčeric filed a report describing the incident as a "murder-robbery by unknown perpetrators". Local Ustaše officials dismissed these findings and suggested that the deaths could be attributed to "Chetniks" (Note: Chetniks were Serbian guerrilla fighters from the first half of the 20th century who fought in the Balkan Wars, World War I and World War II. During the war, the name came to be used as a derogatory term for Serbs in general, especially by the Ustaše.) from the nearby village of Veljun, whose population was predominantly Serb. Dido Kvaternik, a senior Ustaše official, believed that the murders signalled the start of a Serb revolt. He immediately dispatched his subordinates Ivica Šarić and Vjekoslav Luburić to Blagaj. Šarić and Luburić led a contingent of about 50 Ustaše fighters, mostly returnees from Italy, into the village and its surroundings. Under Šarić and Luburić's supervision, the Ustaše rounded up nearly 400 Serbs.

On 6 May, NDH Justice Minister Mirko Puk requested that Vladimir Židovec, the secretary of the Karlovac Ustaše Council, select local lawyers deemed "certified good Croats" to prosecute Serbs suspected of involvement in the Mravunac murders. The arrested individuals were to be tried by a so-called "people's court" in Blagaj. That evening, Puk dispatched messengers from the Karlovac Ustaše Council, telling the lawyers he had selected that they should be ready to depart for Blagaj by 05:00 the following morning. Those selected included Mirko Mikac, president of the county courthouse, as president of the Special People's Court; Ivan Betlehem, the assessor of the county court, and Zdravko Berković, an Ustaša Council representative, as members of the Special People's Court; Milan Stilinović, district court clerk, as the deputy judge; Ivan Gromes, the secretary of the district court, as the state prosecutor; and Berislav Lukinić, a local attorney, as the public defender for the accused.

All those appointed, with the exception of Stilinović and Lukinić, were either Ustaše collaborators or known sympathizers of Pavelić's regime. Early on the morning of 7 May, Puk confirmed the appointments by decree of the Ministry of Justice while the members of the "people's court" were still at the crime scene. According to the subsequent corroborating statements of Betlehem, Stilinović and Lukinić, the members of the "people's court" encountered a large group of prisoners at the Blagaj school, many of whom had visibly been beaten or otherwise tortured. According to surviving detainees, the prisoners had been tortured by Ustaše émigrés under Luburić's supervision. Ustaše from local "readiness units", numbering about 50 armed peasants, also participated. Infuriated by the Mravunac murders, many Croats from Blagaj and neighbouring Pavlovac apprehended their Serb neighbours and brought them to the Blagaj school for "questioning". Lasić repeated before the court that there was no evidence suggesting the perpetrators were Serbs or that there was a political motive behind the murders. He stood by his initial findings and reiterated that the crime was a "murder-robbery by unknown perpetrators". He noted that Mravunac's surviving daughter was unable to identify any of the perpetrators from a police lineup. Šarić promised the court that he would prepare a detailed report with proof that Serb rebels were to blame. The court reconvened at the Blagaj school, stated that there was no evidence to justify a trial and reached a unanimous decision that suspects would only be tried once sufficient evidence had been gathered. By the evening of 7 May, the judges had returned to Karlovac.

== Massacre ==
Luburić was dissatisfied with the court's "relatively lenient" decision, contending that it was not reached in accordance with "Ustaše regulations". Kvaternik also voiced his displeasure. That same day, he arranged for Vlado Singer, an old friend from Kvaternik's émigré days, to form a new "people's court" that would oversee legal proceedings and "try cases in the Ustaše way". On the morning of 8 May, Puk approved the creation of the new court, which convened at the Blagaj school later that day. Joso Rukavina was appointed president of the court, Josip Majić and Jakov Jurag were named members, Josip Raspudić and Grga Ereš were installed as deputy judges, and Vladimir Vranković was assigned the role of state prosecutor. All were staunch pre-war Ustaše, and on this occasion, no public defender was appointed.

The surviving Mravunac daughter was again asked to identify suspects from a police lineup. This time, according to Ereš, she identified a Serb detainee as one of the assailants. The Ustaše interrogated several dozen prominent Serbs: a priest, an interwar mayor, suspected Chetniks and known communists. According to Ustaše records, the following afternoon, 32 individuals were sentenced to death by firing squad for "an attempted Chetnik uprising against the Independent State of Croatia and the murder of the Croatian family Mravunac". After the war, Dušan Nikšić, the only survivor from this group, stated that 36 people were convicted and immediately taken to the execution site, a pit behind the Blagaj school. The court concluded that there was "insufficient evidence" to convict the others that had been arrested. "I later found out that Luburić killed all of the remaining detainees," Ereš said during his post-war interrogation by Yugoslav war crimes investigators. One of the prominent victims of the massacre was Veljun's parish Orthodox priest Branko Dobrosavljević. He was made to recite prayers as his son, who was also arrested, was tortured and killed. Dobrosavljević was then blinded, his beard and hair were torn off, ears cut off before he was executed.

The massacre in Blagaj was the second committed by the Ustaše upon coming to power. Croatian sources tend to understate the number of victims, suggesting as little as 150 killed, while Serbian sources tend to exaggerate, offering figures as high as 600 killed. Most historians agree that the Ustaše massacred around 400 prisoners. Several accounts suggest that the men brought along by Luburić and Šarić participated more extensively in the torture and killing of civilians while local Ustaše activists only assisted and stood guard. Following the war, two local Ustaše admitted their extensive participation in the killings. One Croat woman from Blagaj stated that her husband's participation in the massacre, though limited to guarding the prisoners, left him feeling ill and unable to eat or sleep for several days. The testimonies of survivors indicated that they believed local Croats were equally, if not more, responsible for the killings. The inhabitants of Blagaj recalled hearing gunshots and screams on the night of the murders. One woman recalled seeing Luburić "pouring water from a well by the bucket" so as to wash the blood from his hands and sleeves.

Following the massacre, the inhabitants of Blagaj looted the homes of the murdered inhabitants of Veljun, stealing their valuables and livestock. The victims of the massacre were buried in mass graves, which were subsequently planted over with crops. Prior to burial, their bodies had been covered in quicklime to speed up decomposition.

== Aftermath ==
On 10 May, the women of Veljun stopped by the Blagaj school carrying baskets of food for the prisoners. Šarić told them that the men had been sent to work in Germany, and since the women of Blagaj were unwilling to tell them what had actually occurred, they believed him. As months passed and none of the men were heard from, the women began to fear the worst. "The entire village knew what had happened that night behind their school," the Holocaust scholar Slavko Goldstein writes, "and they participated in a conspiracy of silence that lasted three full months." In August 1941, the Partisans captured Ivan Šajfar, the Ustaše commissioner of Veljun. They demanded to know the prisoners' whereabouts. He told them that they been killed in the pit behind the Blagaj school on the night of 9 May. Shortly thereafter, he was executed.

In September 1942, two battalions of the First Primorsko-Goranski Partisan unit and the First Proletarian Battalion attacked Blagaj. Members of the local Home Guard garrison, consisting of about 120 men, mostly fled or surrendered after sporadic resistance. About 30 defended their homes almost to the last bullet. Some of them were able to escape, several killed themselves rather than be captured, while the rest were captured by the Partisans and summarily executed. Once Blagaj was in Partisan hands, Serb widows from Veljun ransacked and then set fire to more than two dozen of the village's Croat-inhabited homes. "They would have torched all the houses in the village had the Partisans not stopped them," Goldstein writes. The women claimed to have only set fire to the houses in which they had found their property, which the Blagaj Ustaše had stolen in the lead-up to the massacre. After the war, which ended with the destruction of the NDH and re-establishment of Yugoslavia as a socialist state, the inhabitants of Veljun denied that any locals had taken part in the killings. Rumours persisted that the Mravunac family had been killed by a local Ustaše fighter so as to justify a massacre.

Ustaše killings of Serbs continued throughout the war, and dozens of concentration camps were established to detain Serbs, Jews, Gypsies, anti-fascist Croats and others opposed to Pavelić's regime. Contemporary German accounts place the number of Serbs killed by the Ustaše at about 350,000. According to the United States Holocaust Memorial Museum, between 320,000 and 340,000 Serbs were killed by the Ustaše over the course of the war. Most modern historians agree that the Ustaše killed over 300,000 Serbs, about 17 percent of all Serbs living in the NDH. At the Nuremberg trials, these killings were judged to have constituted genocide.

Pavelić fled to Argentina, survived an assassination attempt by Yugoslav government agents in Buenos Aires in 1957, and died of his wounds in Madrid two years later, aged 70. Kvaternik survived the war and the destruction of the NDH, fled to Argentina with his family and was killed in a car accident in 1962. Following the war, Luburić emigrated to Spain, where he was assassinated by a Yugoslav agent in August 1969.

== Legacy ==
A memorial tomb was constructed behind the Blagaj school after the war. The remains of the victims were later transferred to Veljun, where a mausoleum was erected. The monument, erected by Yugoslavia's socialist government, evasively described the perpetrators as "fascists" rather than explicitly calling them Ustaše, part of an attempt at fostering cooperation and reconciliation among the country's ethnic groups. Until 1990, commemorations were held annually every May, with the mandatory attendance of schoolchildren. "Children from Veljun would hear how, in this place, their grandfathers had been killed and the Blagaj Ustaše were the ones who killed them," Goldstein writes. "Children from Blagaj would hear how their grandfathers had been killers, how with no reason they had murdered the grandfathers of the children from Veljun, with whom they went to the same school." In private, the residents of Blagaj blamed Chetniks from Veljun, Poloj and other Serbian villages for initiating an uprising against the NDH and killing the Mravunac family, for which no more than 150 were tried and executed in accordance with the law. The historians Philip Cook and Ben Shepherd note that the atrocities that took place in April and May 1941, such as those at Gudovac, Blagaj and Glina, occurred before any organized uprising by either the Partisans or Chetniks. For the Serbs of Kordun, the killings came to epitomize the brutality of Ustaše rule, and were commemorated in Serbian folk poetry.

Tensions between the residents of Blagaj and Veljun persisted long after the war. By 1991, Blagaj and Pavlovac had been reduced to 200 residents, from a pre-war population of 708, while Veljun and the neighbouring villages of Lapovac and Točak had been reduced to 700 from a pre-war population of 1,297. That same year, all the remaining residents of Blagaj and Pavlovac were forced from their homes by Croatian Serb rebels, amid inter-ethnic warfare sparked by the breakup of Yugoslavia. Most of their houses were pillaged and destroyed. In August 1995, the Croatian Army recaptured all the rebel-held areas in central Croatia, forcing the residents of Veljun and surrounding Serb villages to flee. Their homes too were pillaged and destroyed, and several elderly residents that stayed behind were killed. In 1996, the displaced residents of Blagaj and Pavlovac began returning to their homes, and several years later, some of the pre-war residents of Veljun also returned. On 6 May 1999, they attempted to organize a commemorative ceremony at the Veljun mausoleum, but were prevented from doing so by a crowd of around 100 Croatian nationalists. More numerous and vocal, they forced the residents of Veljun to retreat from the site. A woman then emerged from the crowd and urinated on the ossuary, which was met with laughter and approval. Annual commemorations have resumed since then, though tensions persist, owing primarily to disputes over the number of victims and disagreement over who killed the Mravunac family.

== Selected works ==
- Goldstein, Slavko (2007). 1941. Godina koja se vraća [1941: The Year That Keeps Returning] (in Croatian). Zagreb: Srpsko narodno vijeće. ISBN 9789533582016. Esp. pp. 97–104. English translation published in 2013 with ISBN 9781590176733.
  - The most popular historical synthesis. Includes a comprehensive list of sources.
- Opačić, Dušan (1988). "Pokolj Srba u Hrvatskom Blagaju, maja 1941. godine". In Zatezalo, Đuro (ed.). Kotar Slunj i kotar Veljun u NOR-u i socijalističkoj izgradnji. Zbornik. Vol. 18. Karlovac: Historijski arhiv u Karlovcu. pp. 140–153. ISBN 86-80783-02-1.
  - The final pre-war treatment of the massacre by a historian.
- Ančić, Mladen (1 October 2022). "Neuspjela emancipacija: Hrvatska akademska historiografija i parcijalna kolektivna pamćenja" [Unsuccessful Emancipation: Croatian Academic Historiography and Partial Collective Memory]. Hercegovina: Časopis za kulturno i povijesno naslijeđe (in Croatian) (8): 179–251. doi:10.47960/2712-1844.2022.8.179. eISSN 2566-3429. Esp. pp. 202–228, 232, 233.
  - Critical, but moderate in degree of apology for Croat side. Follows Ivan Strižić in interpreting the testimony of "440" executed written down by parish priest Ivan Nikšić on page 86 of his Spomenice as originally a "44", accusing Stanko Opačić of adding a "0". Ančić admits the priestly account was euphemistic, but views 44 as more in line with the "36" recalled by survivor Dušan Nikšić in 1961.

== See also ==
- List of massacres in the Independent State of Croatia

== Bibliography ==
- Brkljačić, Maja (2004). "Popular Culture and Communist Ideology: Folk Epic's in Tito's Yugoslavia". In Lampe, John; Mazower, Mark (eds.). Ideologies and National Identities: The Case of Twentieth-Century Southeastern Europe. Budapest, Hungary: Central European University Press. pp. 180–211. ISBN 978-9-63924-182-4.
- Cooke, Philip; Shepherd, Ben H. (2013). European Resistance in the Second World War. Barnsley, England: Praetorian Press. ISBN 978-1-47383-304-3.
- Cox, John K. (2007). "Ante Pavelić and the Ustaša State in Croatia". In Fischer, Bernd Jürgen (ed.). Balkan Strongmen: Dictators and Authoritarian Rulers of South Eastern Europe. West Lafayette, Indiana: Purdue University Press. pp. 199–238. ISBN 978-1-55753-455-2.
- Dulić, Tomislav (2005). Utopias of Nation: Local Mass Killing in Bosnia and Herzegovina. Uppsala, Sweden: Uppsala University Press. ISBN 978-91-554-6302-1.
- Erdeljac, Filip (2015). "Ordinary People, Extraordinary Times: Everyday Life in Karlovac Under Ustasha Rule". In Yeomans, Rory (ed.). The Utopia of Terror: Life and Death in Wartime Croatia. Rochester, New York: University of Rochester Press. pp. 61–85. ISBN 978-1-58046-545-8.
- Goldstein, Ivo (1999). Croatia: A History. Translated by Nikolina Jovanović. Montreal, Canada: McGill-Queen's University Press. ISBN 978-0-7735-2017-2.
- Goldstein, Ivo (2007b). "The Independent State of Croatia in 1941: On the Road to Catastrophe". In Ramet, Sabrina P. (ed.). The Independent State of Croatia 1941–45. London, England: Routledge. pp. 417–427. ISBN 978-1-13886-811-3.
- Goldstein, Slavko (2012). 1941: The Year That Keeps Returning. Translated by Michael Gable (2nd ed.). New York City: New York Review Books. ISBN 978-1-59017-673-3.
- Judah, Tim (2000) [1997]. The Serbs: History, Myth and the Destruction of Yugoslavia (2nd ed.). New Haven, Connecticut: Yale University Press. ISBN 978-0-300-08507-5.
- Lemkin, Raphael (2008). Axis Rule in Occupied Europe. Clark, New Jersey: The Lawbook Exchange. ISBN 978-1-58477-901-8.
- Pavlowitch, Stevan K. (2008). Hitler's New Disorder: The Second World War in Yugoslavia. New York City: Columbia University Press. ISBN 978-1-85065-895-5.
- Ramet, Sabrina P. (2006). The Three Yugoslavias: State-Building and Legitimation, 1918–2005. Bloomington, Indiana: Indiana University Press. ISBN 978-0-253-34656-8.
- Roberts, Walter R. (1973). Tito, Mihailović and the Allies 1941–1945. Durham, North Carolina: Duke University Press. ISBN 978-0-8223-0773-0.
- Singleton, Frederick Bernard (1985). A Short History of the Yugoslav Peoples. Cambridge, England: Cambridge University Press. ISBN 978-0-521-27485-2.
- Tanner, Marcus (2001). Croatia: A Nation Forged in War. New Haven, Connecticut: Yale University Press. ISBN 978-0-300-09125-0.
- Tomasevich, Jozo (1975). War and Revolution in Yugoslavia, 1941–1945: The Chetniks. Stanford, California: Stanford University Press. ISBN 978-0-8047-0857-9.
- Tomasevich, Jozo (2001). War and Revolution in Yugoslavia, 1941–1945: Occupation and Collaboration. Stanford, California: Stanford University Press. ISBN 978-0-8047-3615-2.
- Trbovich, Ana S. (2008). A Legal Geography of Yugoslavia's Disintegration. Oxford, England: Oxford University Press. ISBN 978-0-19-533343-5.
- Stojanovic, Aleksandar (2017). "A beleaguered church: The Serbian Orthodox Church in the Independent State of Croatia (NDH) 1941-1945". Balcanica (48): 269–287. doi:10.2298/BALC1748269S.
- Strižić, Ivan (2005). Žrtvoslov slunjskoga kotara: hrvatske vojne i civilne žrtve Drugoga svjetskog rata i poraća. Slunj: Pučko otvoreno učilište Slunj. ISBN 953-95123-0-1.
