= Branko Dobrosavljević =

Serbian Orthodox priest (1886-1941)

Saint Branko Dobrosavljević
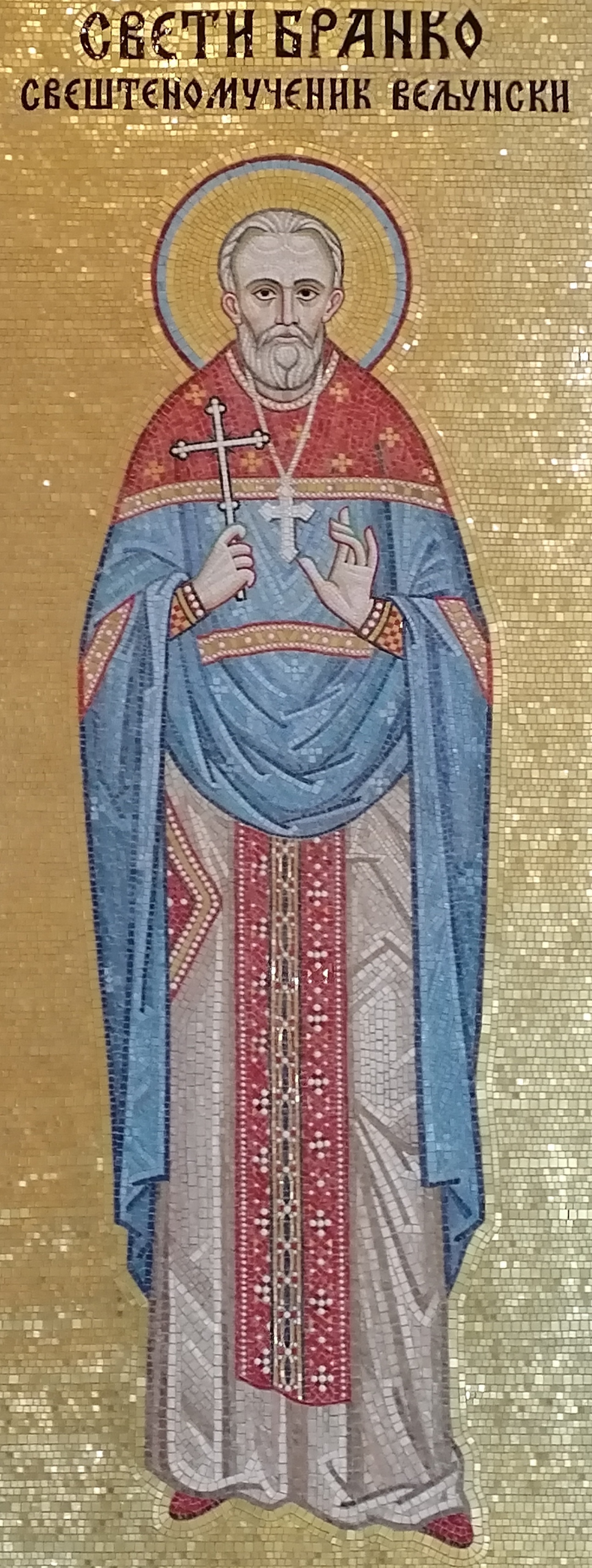

Hieromartyr
- Born: 4 January 1886; Vojnić, Austria-Hungary
- Died: 7 May 1941 (aged 55); Blagaj, Independent State of Croatia
- Venerated in: Eastern Orthodox Church
- Canonized: 2000 by the Holy Synod of Bishops of the Serbian Orthodox Church
- Feast: 7 May (O.S. 24 April)

Branko Dobrosavljević (Serbian Cyrillic: Бранко Добросављевић; 4 January 1886 — 7 May 1941) was a Serbian Orthodox priest who was killed by the Ustaše during the Genocide of Serbs in the Independent State of Croatia in World War II.

== Biography ==
Branko Dobrosavljević was born in the village of Skrad, near Vojnić on 4 January 1886. He completed his high school education as well as the School of Theology at the Seminary in Sremski Karlovci in 1908. He married before he was ordained deacon on 15 March and elevated to presbyter on 22 March 1909. He carried out his clerical tasks in the villages of Buhača, Radovica and Veljun and received the Order of Saint Sava and Order of the Yugoslav Crown of the Fifth Degree for his services to his people. On the Feast of St. George, 6 May 1941, the very day of his own Slava Dobrosavljević was arrested by the Ustaše, headed by Ivan Sajfor from Veljun. Dobrosavljević's son was also arrested along with the parish priest of Cvijanović Brdo, Dimitrije Škorupan. At the time of his arrest, Dobrosavljević served as the parish priest for the village of Veljun.

Some sources state that Dobrosavljević and the others were first imprisoned in a police station in Veljun and killed the next day in the "Kestenovac" forest, near Blagaj as part of the 500 Serbs who were killed in the Blagaj massacre, while others describe him as among the 331 Serbs killed in the village of Otočac.

The victims were taken to a ditch, forced to dig their own graves and then hacked to death with axes. Dobrosavljević and his son were saved until the end. Dobrosavljević was then made to recite prayers as his son was chopped to pieces. Dobrosavljević was then tortured; his hair and beard were torn off, ears cut off and his eyes were gouged out before he was skinned alive.

In 1946 his remains and those of other killed Serbs were transported to a grave in Veljun. In 2000, he was canonized by the Serbian Orthodox Church and officially listed as one of the Serbian Church Saints. He is celebrated on April 24 (Julian Calendar); 7 May (O.S.), the date of his murder.

== See also ==
- List of Serbian saints

== Annotations ==
1. This source erroneously lists the year as 1942 since Dobrosavljević was killed on 7 May 1941.
