= Blagaj Castle =

Medieval fortress near Blagaj, Croatia

Blagaj
- Blagaj; Croatia

Site information
- Type: Castle
- Open to the public: Yes
- Condition: Ruins

Location
- Coordinates: 45°13′06″N 15°31′58″E

Site history
- Built: XIII
- Built by: Babonići
- Materials: Limestone

Blagaj (pronounced [blaːgaj]) is a medieval ruined castle located on the right bank of the Korana river in modern Karlovac county, Croatia. Around it formed an eponymous village, Blagaj.

It has a rectangular floorplan, and was once one of the larger castles in the region, with a central tower, similar to Belaj, Karlovac county. The old parish church of Sv. Duh is proposed to have been situated not far from the ruins, where there are today two churches next to each other.

== Name ==
Not to be confused with the Blagaj in Križevci County owned by the Rohfi of Décse family in the late 15th century, mentioned in 1494 and 1495.

== Geography ==
The castle shares its name with several others in the Dinaric area. One is Blagaj on the Sana in modern Bosnia. The other is Blagaj on the Buna, also in Bosnia Blagaj is a castle of the Kordun region, a low karst plateau. The Korana river cuts through the Kordun, flowing from its source at the beginning of the Plitvice lakes to its confluence with the river Kupa.

Several notable ruins of other objects lie in the vicinity of the ruined castle. An hour's walk in the direction of Veljun on the Korana is the church of Sv. Ivan. Also nearby are the ruins of the castle (mentioned in 1500) and parish church (mentioned 1334, 1501) of Stojmerić, over the hill to the east. On the left bank of the Korana, opposite the castle, are the remains of the parish church of Sv. Kuzma i Damjan in Hrapavci (mentioned 1334, 1501). The Turks destroyed all these older churches in their invasions.

The ruins can be difficult to find, but they are open to the public. The surrounding region is completely free of landmines, according to the interactive map on the website of the Croatian Mine Action Centre, as accessed July 2017.

== History ==
At the time of the first mention of Blagaj, it was owned by the Babonić family, who presumably built it, naming it after Blagaj on the Sana, which they had built in 1240. At the time, Blagaj on the Korana was usually called Blagaj Turanj. In 1266, the lords Petar, Matija, and Kristan Babonić, sons of Roland, Ban of Croatia, received the lands on the right bank of the Korana around Stojmerić, in exchange for a portion of their Vodička županija by the Una by Kostajnica, giving up the ban's lands in Žirovac, Bojna, and Stojmerić.

After this, there is no information on the castle of Blagaj, nor on its dependents, Stojmerić, and Hrapavci around Kuzma (mentioned 1273 as a possession of Stijepan and Radoslav), until the 15th century. In Blagaj, the new parish of Sv. Duh was formed, which survived the Turkish raids until at least 1574. The lords of Blagaj lived mostly in Ozalj, Steničnjak, Zrin, and Ostrožac. In the 15th century, they lived mostly in the castle of Brubanj by Bojna. Since the Turks conquered all that territory up to the 15th century, including the original home of the family, Blagaj on the Sana (about 1540), the Blagajski relocated to their lands on the Korana; Hrapavci and Stojmerići became dependent on Blagaj for defense. The lords, Juraj and Antun were sentenced to loss of property by the abbot of Topusko, but the decision was never finalised, and the king himself confirmed their possession of Stojmerić. Stijepan Blagaj bought the castle of Smrčković near the source of the Glina between Klokoč and Stojmerić.

The Blagaj family fought unusually long against the Turks. In 1563, the regional general wrote that lord Franjo Blagaj guarded his castle "Turanj" on the Korana in person, and in 1572, a permanent guard was approved for his domain. In 1574, Franjo Blagaj and Nikola Frankopan complained to the general that the soldiers sent were pillaging, and so the general gave Blagaj and Bosiljevo castle the right to resist the soldiers. In 1576, Kapidži ban invaded the Korana with a force 2000 strong and carried off 170 people from around Blagaj-Turanj and Skrad in the winter, and both strongholds were destroyed in the battles. In 1582, the general planned for the rebuilding of Blagaj, but because of the attack of Hasan paša in 1584, the castle remained deserted.

Stijepan Blagaj had already fled to Carniola in 1547, receiving the castle of Kočevje. The last owners of Blagaj, Franjo and Stjepan the younger, continued to resist, but they too had to flee to Kranj, from where they continued to fight on the Ottoman front. After the death of Franjo Slunjski, there was a push to make Franjo Blagajski the Ban of Croatia, led by the ban and Cardinal Juraj Drašković, and the Croatian nobility made him the chief of defense of the region south of the river Kupa in 1574, and he died in 1583. Stjepan Blagajski served as a captain in the army of Karlovac, but he died in a battle with the Turks by Zvečaj in 1598. Grgur Blagaj, son of Franjo, was also in the army, and died in 1590.

The Blagajs had received permission to return to their possessions should they be recaptured, and when after the Treaty of Karlowitz in 1699 the castle was repaired for military purposes, Eberhard Blagaj came from Carniola to Croatia and cared for those possessions in the time of king Leopold of Austria. However, the house of Blagaj never fully returned from Carniola, even after selling their Kočevje estates in 1619 and buying Boštanj (Weissenstein) castle near Grosuplje (which they held until the end of the 19th century when the male line died out).

By the year 1700, the square tower in the centre of the castle was only half the height. Soldiers were stationed in the ruins of Blagaj 1699–1865, but after that, it was left to fall apart.

== See also ==
- List of castles in Croatia
- Military history of Croatia

== Bibliography ==
- Kruhek, Milan (1976). Stari gradovi između Kupe i Korane [Old Castles Between the Kupa and the Korana] (PDF) (in Croatian).
