= Blagaj, Croatia =

Blagaj
- Village
- Location within Croatia
- Coordinates: 45°12′43″N 15°32′28″E
- Country: Croatia
- County: Karlovac County
- Municipality: Slunj

Area
  - Total: 3.9 sq mi (10.0 km^{2})

Population (2021)
  - Total: 24
  - Density: 6.2/sq mi (2.4/km^{2})
- Time zone: UTC+1 (CET)
  - Summer (DST): UTC+2 (CEST)

Blagaj, also known historically as Blagaj on the Korana, is a village in Croatia's Karlovac County, near the town of Slunj. According to the 2001 Croatian census, the village had 38 inhabitants. It is known for the Blagaj castle, but also the 1941 Blagaj massacre.

== Architecture ==
=== Blagaj castle ===
It has a rectangular floorplan, and was once one of the larger castles in the region, with a central tower, similar to Belaj, Karlovac county. The old parish church of Sv. Duh is proposed to have been situated not far from the ruins, where there are today two churches next to each other. (Full article...)

== History ==
=== WWII ===
On the night of 5—6 May 1941, an armed robbery resulted in the killing 5 members of the Mravunac family, following which "the Serbs" of Veljun and other environs of Blagaj were accused and rounded up. A court-martial in Zagreb condemned 32 of them to execution by firing squad on 7 May 1941. This event escalated into the Blagaj massacre, and alongside the earlier Gudovac massacre, many have treated it retrospectively as an indicator of future NDH treatment of the Serbs.

== Demographics ==
Village of Blagaj: Population trends 1857–2021
v

population	483	562	533	574	585	649	553	626	487	417	345	219	104	128	38	27	24
	1857	1869	1880	1890	1900	1910	1921	1931	1948	1953	1961	1971	1981	1991	2001	2011	2021

Note:Hrvatski Blagaj and Srpski Blagaj merged in 2001. In 1981 and 1991 part of the population was counted under Crno Vrelo, and in these same years the population count of Blagaj included Pavlovac. Sources: Croatian Bureau of Statistics publications
