= Gudovac massacre =

Massacre of Serbs by Ustaše in Croatia in WWII

- Part of the Genocide of Serbs in the Independent State of Croatia
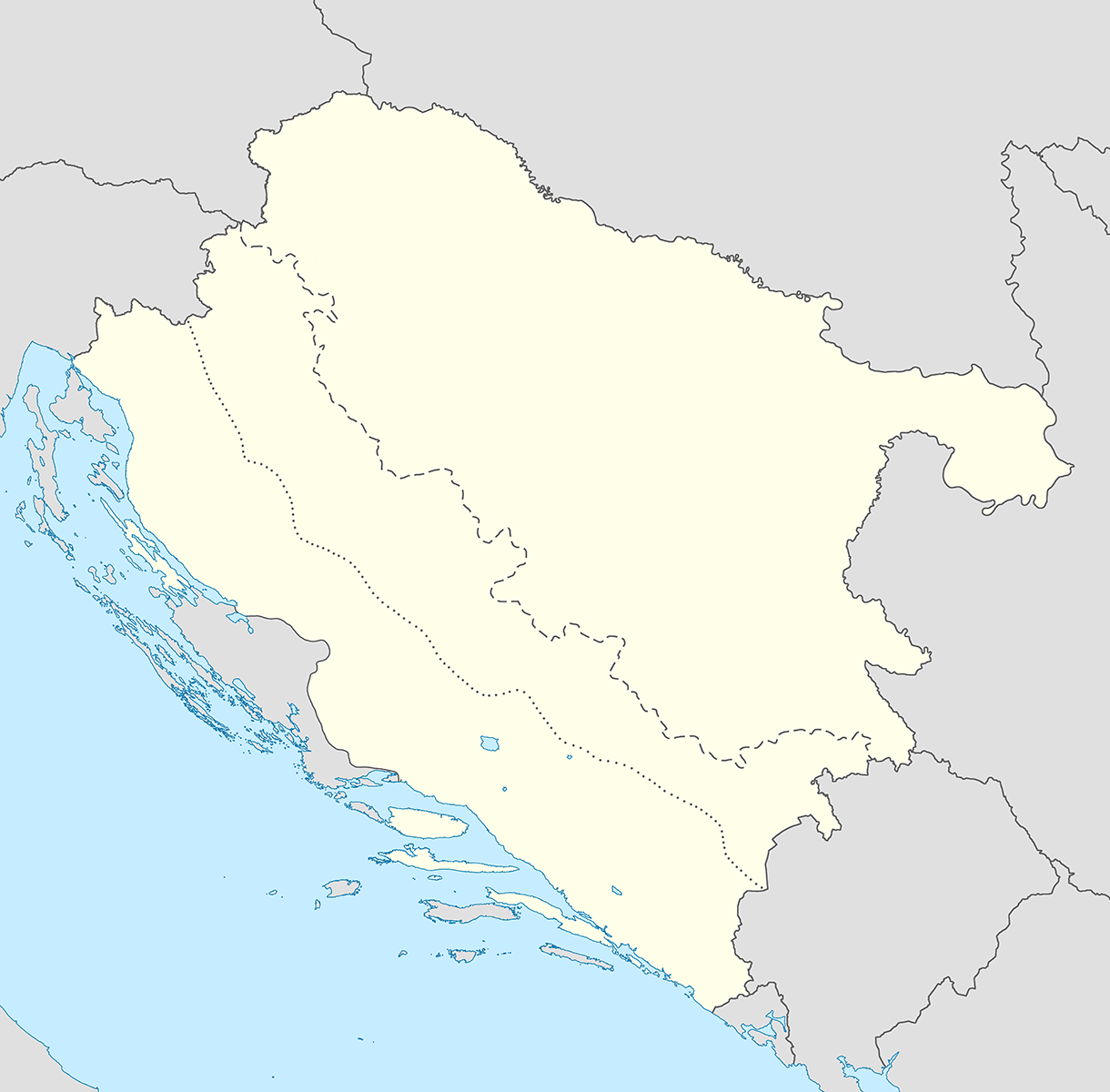
- Gudovac (NDH) A map of the Independent State of Croatia showing the location of Gudovac
- Location: 45°53′16″N 16°46′16″E; Gudovac, Independent State of Croatia
- Date: 28 April 1941
- Target: Serbs
- Attack type: Summary executions
- Deaths: 184–196
- Perpetrator: Ustaše

The Gudovac massacre was the mass killing of around 190 Bjelovar Serbs by the Croatian nationalist Ustaše movement on 28 April 1941, during World War II. The massacre occurred shortly after the German-led Axis invasion of Yugoslavia and the establishment of the Ustaše-led Axis puppet state known as the Independent State of Croatia (NDH). It was the first act of mass murder committed by the Ustaše upon coming to power, and presaged a wider Ustaše-perpetrated campaign of genocide against Serbs in the NDH that lasted until the end of the war.

The Ustaše used the mysterious deaths of two of their local followers as a pretext for the killings. The victims were drawn from Gudovac and its surroundings on 28 April. Most were arrested under the guise that they were rebels loyal to the ousted Yugoslav government. They were taken to a nearby field and collectively shot by a firing squad of up to 70 Ustaše guards. Five of the prisoners managed to survive the initial volley and crawled away to safety. The Ustaše forced Gudovac's surviving inhabitants to dig a mass grave for the victims and pour quicklime on the bodies to speed up decomposition. The following day, relatives of one of the victims informed the Germans of what had transpired. The Germans ordered a partial exhumation of the mass grave, and had 40 suspected perpetrators arrested. Mladen Lorković, a senior Ustaše official, used his influence to have the detained men released and promised German ambassador Siegfried Kasche that the Croatian authorities would carry out a thorough investigation. No investigation took place.

An ossuary and a mausoleum were erected on the site of the massacre in 1955, as was a monument by the sculptor Vojin Bakić. In 1991, amid inter-ethnic violence during the Croatian War of Independence, the monument and the mausoleum were destroyed by Croatian nationalists, as was another one of Bakić's works, Bjelovarac (The Man From Bjelovar). The ruins of the ossuary were removed by the local authorities in 2002. That same year, residents signed a petition to have the Bjelovarac monument erected once again. The restored monument was unveiled in December 2010.

== Background ==
=== Inter-war period ===
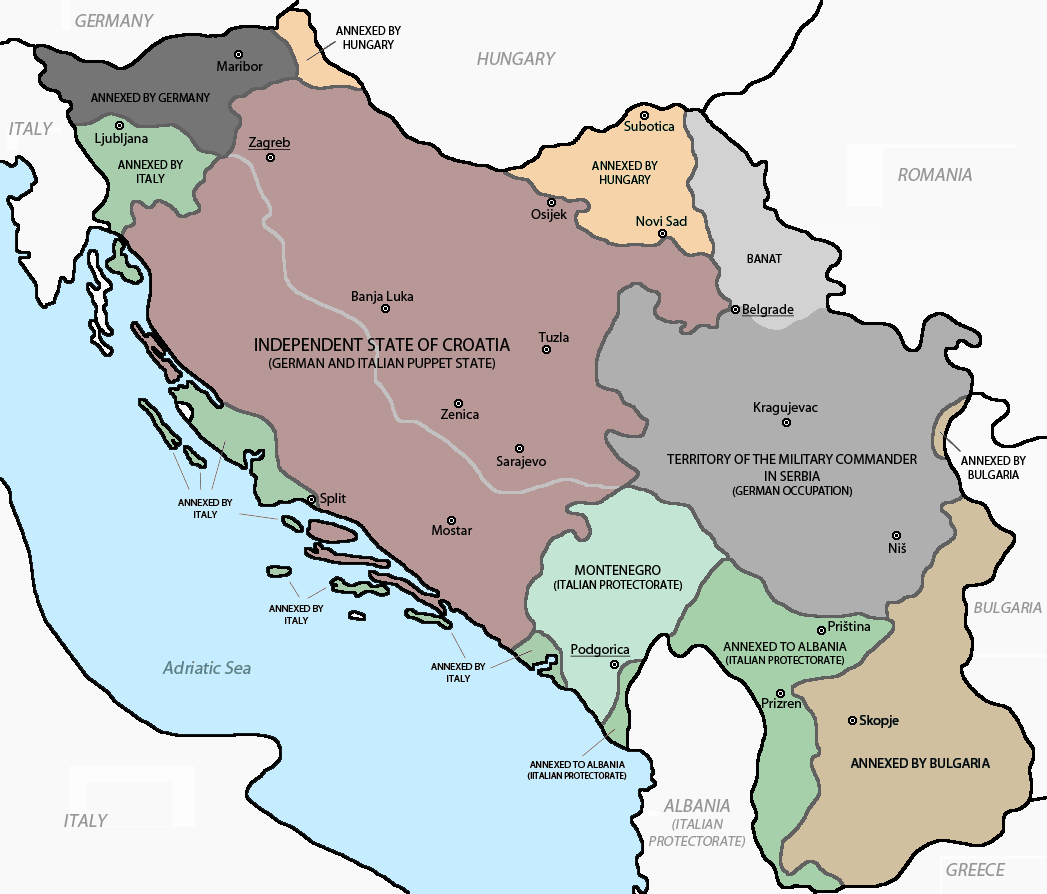
Occupation and partition of Yugoslavia, 1941–1943

Gudovac is a village near Bjelovar, about 80 kilometres (50 mi) east of the NDH capital, Zagreb. It was first settled during the Middle Ages, and had an ethnically mixed population through much of its history. In 1931, Gudovac had 1,073 inhabitants living in 330 households. Croats formed two-thirds of the population, while the remaining inhabitants were ethnic Serbs. The Gudovac municipality had a population of 8,000, including 3,000 Serbs.

Gudovac had been part of a common South Slav state since November 1918, when the Kingdom of Serbs, Croats and Slovenes was proclaimed. At its creation, the Kingdom included six million Serbs, 3.5 million Croats and one million Slovenes, among others. Being the largest ethnic group, the Serbs favoured a centralized state; Croats, Slovenes and Bosnian Muslims did not. The Vidovdan Constitution, approved on 28 June 1921 and based on the Serbian constitution of 1903, established the Kingdom as a parliamentary monarchy under the Serbian Karađorđević dynasty. Belgrade was chosen as the capital of the new state, assuring Serb and Orthodox Christian political dominance. In 1928, Croatian Peasant Party (Hrvatska seljačka stranka, HSS) leader Stjepan Radić was shot and mortally wounded on the floor of the country's parliament by a Serb deputy. The following year, King Alexander proclaimed the 6 January Dictatorship and renamed his country Yugoslavia to deemphasize its ethnic makeup. Yugoslavia was divided into nine administrative units called banates (banovine), six of which had ethnic Serb majorities. In 1931, Alexander issued a decree allowing the Yugoslav Parliament to reconvene on the condition that only pro-Yugoslav parties were allowed to be represented in it. Marginalized, far-right and far-left parties thrived. The Ustaše, a Croatian fascist movement, emerged as the most extreme of these. The movement was driven by a deep hatred of Serbs. In 1932, the Ustaše launched the so-called Velebit uprising, attacking a police station in Lika. The police responded harshly to the attack and harassed the local population, leading to further animosity between Croats and Serbs. In 1934, an Ustaše-trained assassin killed Alexander while he was on a state visit to France. Alexander's cousin, Prince Paul, became regent and took up the king's responsibilities until Alexander's son Peter turned 18.

Following the 1938 Anschluss (union) between Germany and Austria, Yugoslavia came to share a border with the Third Reich and fell under increasing pressure as her neighbours became aligned with the Axis powers. In April 1939, Italy opened a second frontier with Yugoslavia when it invaded and occupied neighbouring Albania. At the outbreak of World War II, the Yugoslav government declared its neutrality. Between September and November 1940, Hungary and Romania joined the Tripartite Pact, and Italy invaded Greece. From that time, Yugoslavia was almost completely surrounded by the Axis powers and their satellites, and her neutral stance toward the war came under tremendous pressure. In late February 1941, Bulgaria joined the Pact. The next day, German troops entered Bulgaria from Romania, closing the ring around Yugoslavia. Intending to secure his southern flank for the impending attack on the Soviet Union, Adolf Hitler began placing heavy pressure on Yugoslavia to join the Axis. On 25 March 1941, after some delay, the Yugoslav government conditionally signed the Pact. Two days later, a group of pro-Western, Serbian nationalist air force officers deposed Prince Paul in a bloodless coup d'état. The conspirators declared the 17-year-old Prince Peter of age and brought to power a "government of national unity" led by General Dušan Simović. The coup enraged Hitler. "Even if Yugoslavia at first should give declarations of loyalty," he stated, "she must be considered ... a foe and ... destroyed as quickly as possible." He then ordered the invasion of Yugoslavia, which commenced on 6 April 1941.

=== Fall of Bjelovar ===
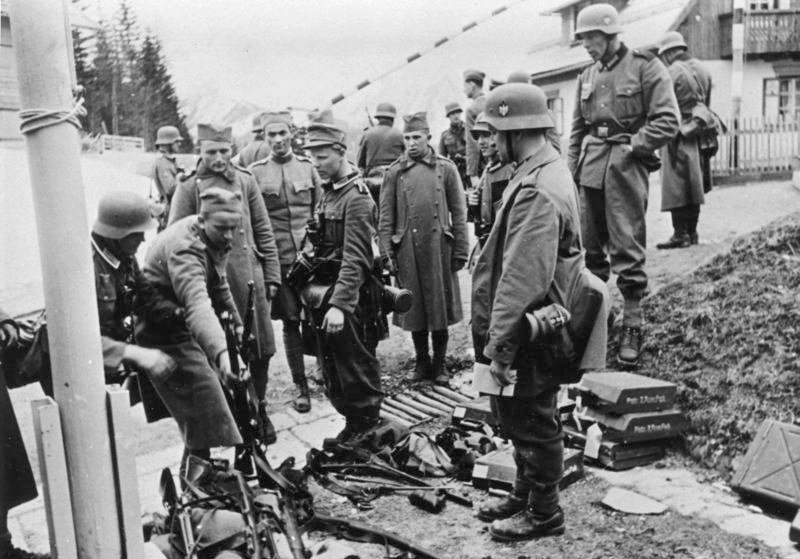
VKJ personnel surrendering to the Germans

The Royal Yugoslav Army (Vojska Kraljevine Jugoslavije, VKJ) was quickly overwhelmed by the combined German, Italian and Hungarian assault. Much of its equipment was obsolete, its military strategy was outdated and its soldiers were ill-disciplined and poorly trained. To make matters worse, many of the VKJ's Croat personnel refused to fight the Germans, whom they considered liberators from Serb oppression. This attitude was shared by many soldiers of the 40th Infantry Division Slavonska's largely Croat 108th Regiment, which was stationed in Veliki Grđevac. The regiment had been mobilized in Bjelovar, and on 7 April was marching towards Virovitica to take up positions, when its Croat members revolted and arrested the Serb officers and soldiers. Led by Captain Ivan Mrak, the regiment disarmed a Yugoslav gendarmerie post in Garešnica and began marching back to Bjelovar alongside a band of Ustaše rebels under Mijo Hans. The following morning, elements of the 108th Regiment entered Bjelovar and clashed with the local gendarmerie, sustaining losses of two killed and three wounded. At about noon, the regiment joined up with elements of the 42nd Infantry Regiment and other units of the 40th Infantry Division. At around the same time, Julije Makanec, the Croat mayor of Bjelovar, joined Ustaše official Ivan Šestak and HSS representative Franjo Hegeduš in demanding that the VKJ surrender the town to the rebels. When the 4th Army's commander, General Petar Nedeljković, learned of the rebel approach, he ordered the local gendarmerie commander to maintain order, but was advised that this would not be possible as local Croat conscripts would not report for duty. Fourth Army headquarters reported the rebels' presence to the headquarters of the 1st Army Group, which requested that HSS leader Vladko Maček intervene with the rebels. Maček agreed to send an emissary to the 108th Infantry Regiment urging them to obey their officers, to no avail.

Later in the day, two trucks of rebels arrived at 4th Army headquarters in Bjelovar with the intention of killing the staff. The headquarters guard force prevented this, but the operations staff immediately withdrew from Bjelovar to Popovača. After issuing several unanswered ultimatums, around 8,000 rebels attacked Bjelovar, assisted by Croat fifth-columnists within the town. Bjelovar surrendered, and many Yugoslav officers and soldiers were captured by the Germans and Ustaše rebels. Local Croats welcomed the revolt with great enthusiasm. When Nedeljković heard of Bjelovar's capture, he called Makanec and threatened to bomb the city if VKJ prisoners were not immediately released. Detained officers from 4th Army headquarters and the 108th Infantry Regiment were then sent to Zagreb. At about 4:00 p.m., Nedeljković informed the Ban of Croatia, Ivan Šubašić, of the revolt, but Šubašić was powerless to influence events. Two hours later, Makanec declared that Bjelovar was part of an independent Croatian state. This was the only significant pro-Ustaše revolt in Croatia and Bosnia-Herzegovina prior to 10 April. Ustaše propaganda celebrated it as "an uprising of the Croatian people against the April War", claiming it showed that Croats wholeheartedly supported Yugoslavia's destruction.

=== Creation of the NDH ===
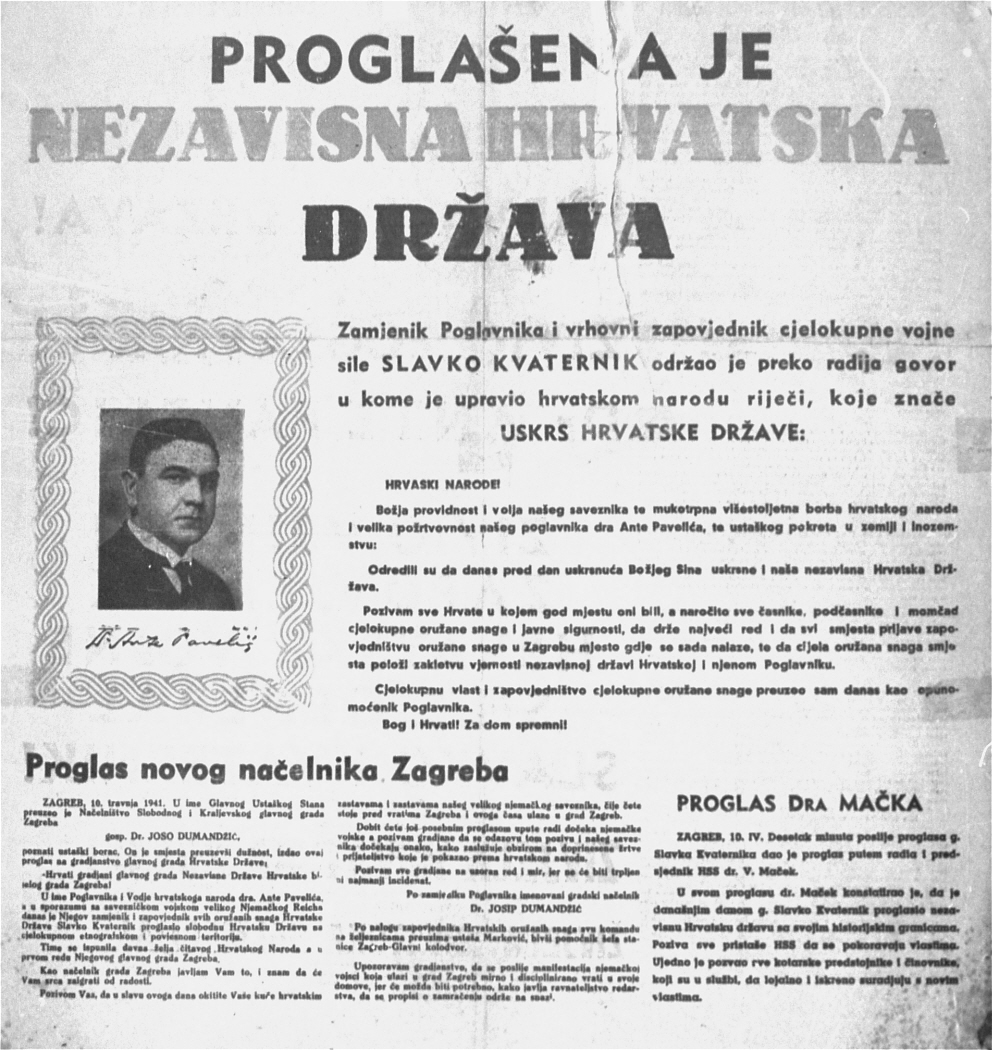
The official proclamation of the Independent State of Croatia, 10 April 1941

On 10 April, senior Ustaše commander Slavko Kvaternik proclaimed the establishment of the Independent State of Croatia (Nezavisna Država Hrvatska, NDH). The declaration came exactly one week before the VKJ's unconditional surrender to the Axis powers. The leader of the Ustaše, Ante Pavelić, was in Rome at the time and made arrangements to travel to Karlovac, just west of Zagreb. He arrived in Karlovac on 13 April, accompanied by 250–400 of his followers. Pavelić reached Zagreb on 15 April, having granted territorial cessions to Italy at Croatia's expense and promised the Germans he had no intention of pursuing a foreign policy independent of Berlin. That same day, Germany and Italy extended diplomatic recognition to the NDH. Pavelić was declared Poglavnik ("leader") of the Ustaše-led Croatian state, which combined the territory of much of present-day Croatia, all of present-day Bosnia and Herzegovina and parts of present-day Serbia.

Pavelić and his followers intended to create an "ethnically pure" Croatia through the mass murder and deportation of Serbs, Jews and other non-Croats. Only about fifty percent of the NDH's 6.2 million inhabitants were Croat. Nearly two million Serbs, about one-third of the NDH's total population, now found themselves within the borders of the newly formed state. In addition, Serb-majority areas covered between 60 and 70 percent of the NDH's total landmass. "The Croatian state cannot exist if 1.8 million Serbs are living in it and if we have a powerful Serbian state at our backs," Croatia's future Foreign Minister Mladen Lorković explained. "Therefore, we are trying to make the Serbs disappear from our regions." Dido Kvaternik, a senior Ustaše official, was entrusted with "cleansing" Bjelovar and its surroundings. The younger Kvaternik recalled: "When we triumphantly returned home from abroad and when Pavelić decided that I should take over the implementation of the measures against Serbs and Jews, I obeyed immediately and without hesitation because I knew that this question had to be resolved for the future of the Croatian people and state, and that someone had to make the sacrifice so that these odious but necessary measures could be carried out." Pavelić's orders for the extermination of non-Croats in and around Bjelovar were likely delivered orally to ensure that no written evidence remained.

== Prelude ==
Immediately after seizing Bjelovar, the Ustaše set about strengthening their hold of the city. Josip Verhas, an ethnic German, was appointed the acting head of Bjelovar district, Đuro Vojnović was appointed Ustaše representative to the Bjelovar district, and Hans was named the Ustaše commissioner for Bjelovar county. Alojz Čukman was appointed chief of police. He immediately decreed that all of Bjelovar's Serbs had to wear a red armband with the word "Serb" written in both Croatian and German. Ivan Garščić, a public notary, was appointed acting commander of the Bjelovar armoury and set about reorganizing local Ustaše formations. Mrak, who had distinguished himself as one of the leaders of the 108th Regiment's revolt, was tasked with overseeing the city centre.

Between 9 and 14 April, groups of soldiers from the disbanded 108th Regiment roamed the Bjelovar countryside looking for a way home. Serb officers that had refused to surrender raided Croat homes, hoping to find food, money and civilian clothing that would make it easier for them to pass through German and Ustaše checkpoints. In some villages, Croat peasants disarmed defeated VKJ units and plundered their warehouses. Some of these peasants, especially those in Gudovac, entered local units known as "readiness battalions". On 10 April, the Germans reached Bjelovar and set up a series of command posts but left the Ustaše in de facto control of the city. The Ustaše were wary of the danger posed by the Serb peasantry. Many had been in the VKJ at the time of the invasion, and had simply discarded their military fatigues and taken their rifles home. Mišo Sabolek, a local Ustaše commander, reported: "Bjelovar and its surroundings are besieged by Serbs, who are ... killing and looting homes in the villages of Nart, Gudovac and the Česma forest." In mid-April, Sabolek reported that he had sent 35 gunmen to "quell violence" around Bjelovar. His superiors in Zagreb ordered him to "take any measures necessary to restore order" in the district. The Ustaše searched dozens of Serb homes, hoping to find illegal weapons. This was followed by the arresting of "undesired elements", mostly members of the Communist Party of Yugoslavia (Komunistička partija Jugoslavije, KPJ). "The disarming of Serbs ... is vital to securing the future of the young Croatian state," wrote Edmund Glaise-Horstenau, the German Plenipotentiary General in the NDH. Julius Eker, the local KPJ chairman, was arrested on 12 April.

On 16 April, Slavko Kvaternik announced that Serb peasants in the NDH had eight days to hand their weapons over to the Ustaše. Another influential communist, Milan Bakić, was arrested in Bjelovar on 20 April. On 22 April, the Ustaše arrested most of the town's remaining KPJ members. Communist organizers such as Stevo Šabić, Franko Winter and Sándor Király were arrested on 24 April. By 25 April, several hundred known or suspected anti-fascists had been arrested by the Ustaše. Some were spared death and given prison sentences, but most were executed without trial. That same day, an Ustaše patrol discovered 80 rifles and several machine guns in the home of a local KPJ member. Forty rifles and two machine guns were found in the home of another local communist.

Alarmed by the prospect of an armed rebellion in Bjelovar and the surrounding countryside, Kvaternik selected a broad area in and around the town where Serbs were to be "cleansed". "For every Croat killed," he said, "we must execute 100 Serbs." The disarming and arresting of VKJ personnel by the Ustaše was accompanied by numerous incidents, in which about 20 armed VKJ troops and Serb civilians were killed. Kvaternik feared that these deaths would only increase the likelihood of an armed revolt and became even more wary when he heard rumours that Bjelovar's Serbs were planning an uprising to coincide with the feast day of St. George (Đurđevdan), on 6 May. Interior Minister Andrija Artuković arrived in Bjelovar after hearing such rumours. At a meeting with Verhas and his lieutenants, he stated that "serious action" would have to be taken to "send a message to the enemies of the Ustaše and the NDH". On 26 April, Kvaternik and his closest assistant, Ivica Šarić, organized the mass arrest of 530 Serb villagers from Grubišno Polje. Thirty Ustaše took part in the arrests. The detainees were transported to the Danica camp, near Koprivnica, and from there taken to Ustaše camps at Gospić, Pag Island, Jasenovac and Stara Gradiška, where most were killed.

== Timeline ==
=== Arrests ===
On 25 April, the Ustaše arrested a Serb named Milan Radovanović when he stopped by the Bjelovar police station to hand over his rifle. He had fought with the VKJ at the time of the invasion and spent two weeks hiding in the forests before returning to his home in Prgomelje. His relatively late return prevented him from handing over his rifle before the Ustaše deadline on 24 April. On the morning of 26 April, as Radovanović and another Serb prisoner were being escorted from the county jail by two Ustaše guards, two unidentified gunmen opened fire on the detainees and guards. A skirmish ensued, and Radovanović and one of the guards were killed. The second guard was wounded. That afternoon, a Croatian Home Guard (or domobran) was killed by a stray bullet in his yard while on leave. Kvaternik immediately blamed the deaths on "Serb agitators". In their internal documents, the Ustaše attributed the deaths to "local Chetniks", (Note: Chetniks were Serbian guerrilla fighters from the first half of the 20th century who pledged loyalty to the Karađorđević dynasty and fought against the perceived enemies of Serbia and the Serb people. During the war, the name came to be used as a derogatory term for Serbs in general, especially by the Ustaše.) a claim that has never been proven. Some historians have hypothesized that the attack on the county jail and the death of the Home Guard were false flag attacks intended to rally Croats against local Serbs. This allegation has also never been proven.

Upon hearing news of the attack at the county jail, Kvaternik ordered the arrest of 200 Serb peasants from Gudovac and the neighbouring villages of Veliko and Malo Korenovo, Prgomelje, Bolč, Klokočevac, Tuk, Stančići and Breza. The arrests occurred in the early morning hours of 28 April. The action was personally supervised by Kvaternik and carried out by members of the local Croatian Peasant Guard, which had been turned into a "quasi-military unit" under the command of Martin Čikoš, whom the journalist Slavko Goldstein describes as a "sworn pre-war Ustaša". (Note: Earlier, Verhas had found Čikoš intoxicated in the home of a local Serb. He scolded Čikoš for "lying around drunk" while people were "dropping like flies". Čikoš promptly murdered his host.) Most of the more prominent or wealthy inhabitants of Gudovac were arrested, including teachers, businessmen and Serbian Orthodox priests. "Their sole crime," Goldstein writes, "was that they were of the Orthodox faith and perhaps a little more prosperous than their neighbours." Shortly before the killings, Verhas, Čikoš and local Ustaše officials Rudolf Srnak, Nikola Pokopac and Mirko Pavlešić held a meeting where it was decided that the prisoners would be killed.

=== Killings ===
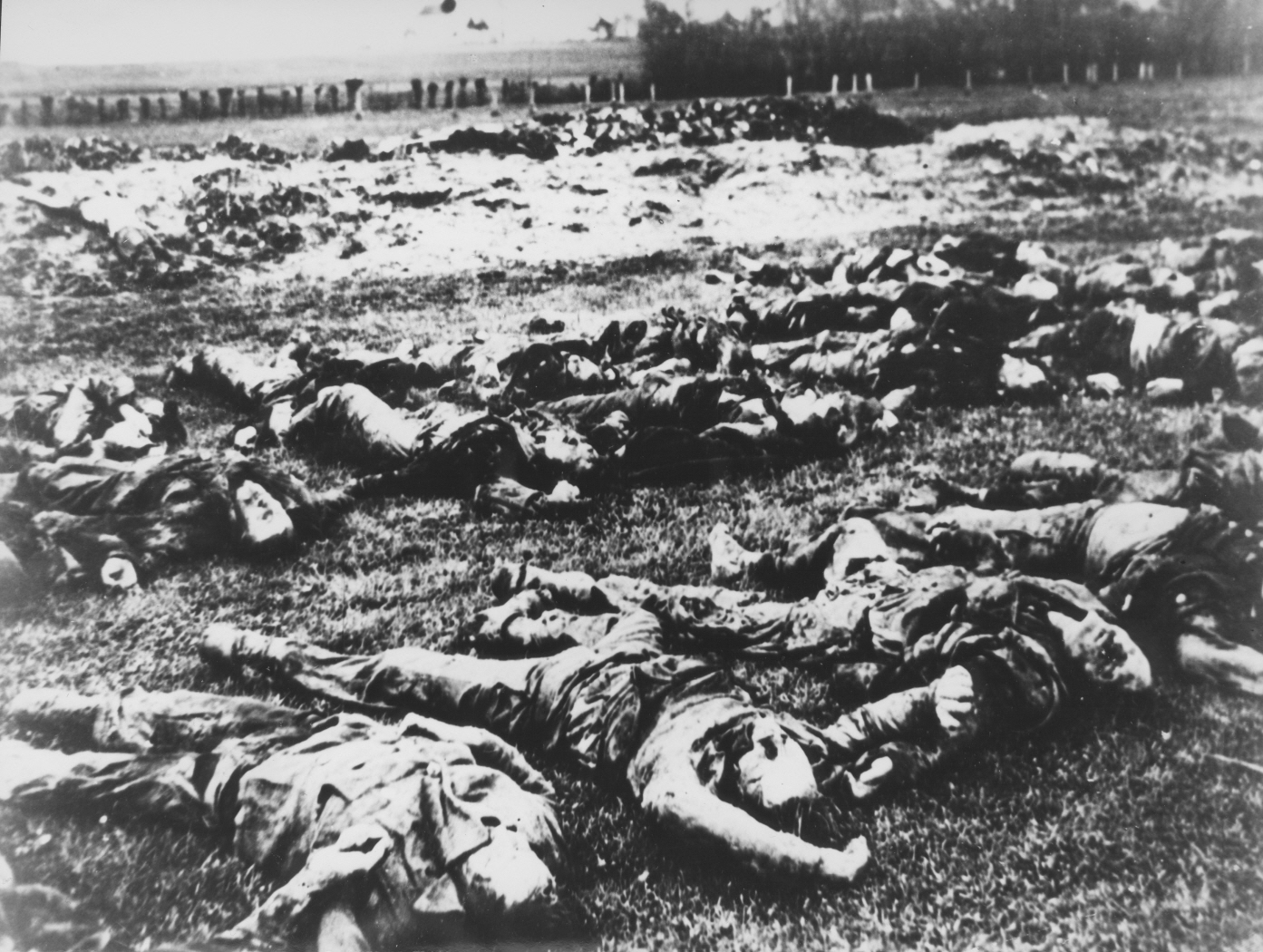
Bodies of victims exhumed by German investigators, 30 April 1941

The prisoners were taken to the Gudovac municipal building and held there for a time. They were told that they would be taken to Bjelovar for interrogation. Instead, they were ordered to march in the opposite direction, towards a field beside the river Plavnica where an open-air market was held each week. The prisoners left Gudovac just before sunset, supervised by as many as 70 armed guards. Many of the prisoners sensed the fate that awaited them but were unable to escape. According to one post-war testimony, Čikoš was "upset, uneasy ... and in no mood to talk". As the prisoners were being marched out of Gudovac, he pulled one of his Serb neighbours from the group and told him to "get lost" before ordering the remaining 200 detainees to line up against a wall. Kvaternik appeared before the group and asked if it contained any Croats. Four stepped forward and offered their identification papers; three were permitted to return to their homes upon having their identities verified but the fourth was sent back among the Serbs because he was a communist. Kvaternik, Čikoš and several newly appointed Ustaše officers supervised the march. According to survivors, the guards hurtled insults at the prisoners, and forced them to sing Ustaše songs and chant "Long live Pavelić! Long live Kvaternik!"

The prisoners reached the field just after sunset and were ordered to line up in ranks and make a left face; the guards then raised their rifles and opened fire. Some executioners hesitated before firing, conscious that their friends and neighbours were about to be killed, and many of the victims were initially struck in the legs. Some of the wounded cursed the Ustaše and others cried in agony. Kvaternik observed the massacre from a distance of about 50 metres (160 ft), accompanied by Hans, Verhas and Pavlešić. Pavlešić was dissatisfied with the speed of the killings and shouted at Čikoš, telling him to "finish the job". Čikoš's men then went about looking for survivors and bayonetting anyone that moved. Five prisoners escaped before Čikoš's men could kill them and fled to a nearby forest.

The killings were the first act of mass murder committed by the Ustaše upon coming to power. Estimates of the number of victims vary. Marko Attila Hoare, a historian specializing in the Balkans, puts the figure at 184 killed. The journalist Tim Judah writes that there were 187 fatalities. Other historians, such as Ivo Goldstein and Mark Biondich, mention 196 deaths.

== Aftermath ==
=== Reaction ===
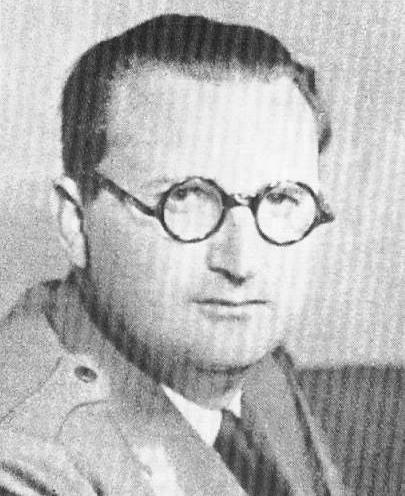
Ustaše official Mladen Lorković secured the release of those arrested in connection to the massacre.

Kvaternik and the Ustaše never attempted to conceal the killings, which were deliberately carried out in a relatively public space so as to cause terror among the Serb population. Local Croats were fully aware of what had transpired. Following the massacre, the Ustaše forced Gudovac's remaining inhabitants to dig a 150 m^{2} (1,600 sq ft) mass grave and cover the remains of the victims with quicklime to speed up decomposition. Once the dead had been buried, the villagers were permitted to return to their homes.

News of the massacre quickly spread through Bjelovar. The following day, the wife and daughter of one of the victims visited a German command post, reported the massacre, and led two German officers to the mass grave. The officers informed their superiors of what had taken place and complained of the "disorder" in their area of responsibility. Their superiors demanded a partial exhumation of the gravesite, ordered that the exhumed corpses be photographed, and requested an investigation, as well as the arrest and punishment, of those responsible. On the orders of a local German commander, 40 suspected perpetrators were arrested on the evening of 29 April. Their weapons were seized and they were temporarily detained in the Bjelovar high school. The same evening, Lorković requested an urgent meeting with German ambassador Siegfried Kasche. According to Kasche, Lorković told him that eleven Croats had been killed by the Serbs and that a massacre of 192 men from Gudovac and its surroundings was carried out in retaliation. According to Goldstein, the figure of eleven dead Croats was made up by Lorković in order to justify the massacre. The historian Željko Karaula claims that the VKJ marched into several hamlets on 11 April and summarily executed eleven Croats that had refused to report for mobilization several days earlier. Goldstein posits that 25 of the 27 Croats whose deaths the Ustaše attributed to "Serb agitators" prior to the massacre had perished in combat operations during the rebellion of the 108th Regiment. Michele F. Levy, a historian specializing in the Holocaust, agrees that there had been no mass killing of Croats leading up to the massacre. The historians Philip Cooke and Ben Shepherd write that the massacre occurred before any organized Serb resistance had commenced.

Lorković maintained that the massacre in Gudovac was an "internal political issue under the jurisdiction of the Croatian government" and requested that the suspected perpetrators be handed over to the Ustaše. He promised Kasche that Zagreb would carry out a full investigation. Kasche accepted Lorković's proposal, likely at the urging of his superiors. The Ustaše detained at the Bjelovar high school were released and their weapons returned to them. The promised investigation never took place.

=== Legacy ===
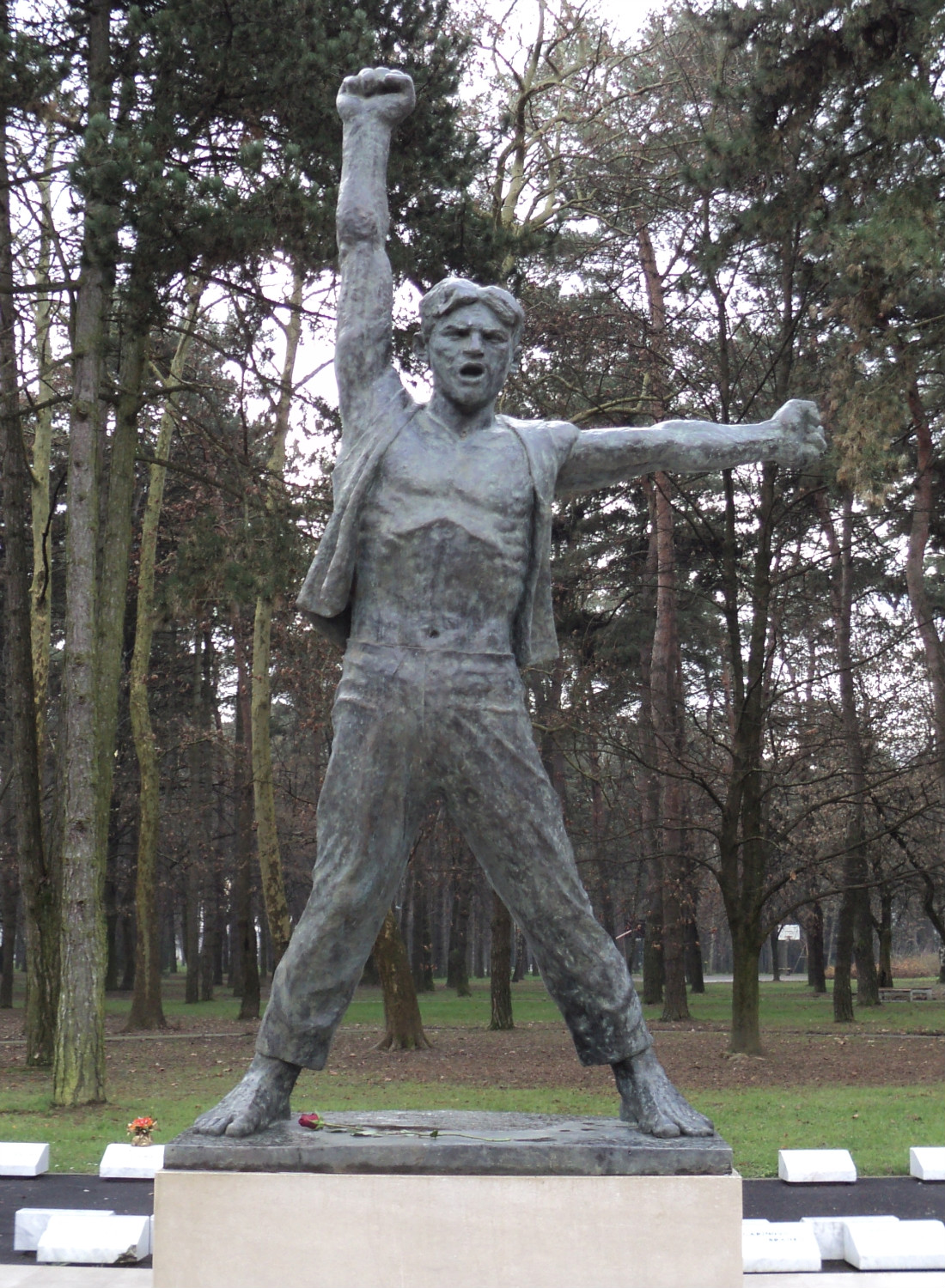
The replica of Bjelovarac (The Man from Bjelovar), 2010

The National Archive in Bjelovar contains extensive documentation of the massacre, including a list of victims compiled by Ustaše officials in May 1941, in which many prisoners are described as being "shot as Chetniks". A statement describes the "fright" of the Serb population and the "distress" of local Croats. The HSS party leadership distanced itself from the massacre and condemned the actions of the Ustaše, as did the majority of local HSS activists, many of whom ended up joining the Partisans. According to some sources, even Makanec tried to distance himself from the killings, and allegedly protested to the "appropriate authorities" in Zagreb. (Note: This is contradicted by Croatian journalist Sven Milekić, who writes that Makanec did not react to the killings.) He went on to become the Croatian Minister of Education in 1943 and served in this capacity until May 1945. He was arrested by the Partisans the following month and subsequently executed. A street in Bjelovar is named after him. Lorković was implicated in a conspiracy to overthrow the NDH government in mid-1944, arrested, and executed in the last weeks of the war at Pavelić's behest. Kvaternik survived the war and the destruction of the NDH, fled to Argentina with his family and was killed in a car accident in 1962. Pavelić also fled to Argentina, survived an assassination attempt by Yugoslav government agents in Buenos Aires in 1957, and died of his wounds in Madrid two years later.

Ustaše killings of Serbs continued throughout the war, and concentration camps were established to detain Serbs, Jews, Gypsies, anti-fascist Croats and others opposed to Pavelić's regime. Contemporary German accounts place the number of Serbs killed by the Ustaše at about 350,000. According to the United States Holocaust Memorial Museum, between 320,000 and 340,000 Serbs were killed by the Ustaše over the course of the war. Most modern historians agree that the Ustaše killed over 300,000 Serbs, or about 17 percent of all Serbs living in the NDH. At the Nuremberg trials, these killings were judged to have constituted genocide.

An ossuary and a mausoleum were built on the site of the massacre in 1955. A monument called Gudovac—Before the Firing Squad, by the Serb sculptor Vojin Bakić, was erected on the same spot. (Note: The names of 196 victims were engraved on the monument's pedestal. Also engraved was a six-verse poem: They loved the sun and laughter They wanted bread for everyone in the world And for no human to kill another. The sowers of darkness and hate Took their lives away; Their deaths must not be in vain.) In 1991, amid inter-ethnic violence caused by the breakup of Yugoslavia and the Yugoslav Wars, the monument and mausoleum were destroyed by Croatian nationalists. Also destroyed was one of Bakić's most famous monuments, Bjelovarac (The Man from Bjelovar). Bakić had dedicated the monument to his brothers, who were killed by the Ustaše. What remained of the ossuary was removed by the local authorities in 2002. That year, residents signed a petition to have a replica of Bjelovarac erected at the same spot. The local government promised to supply half the amount needed to restore the monument. In 2005, the Croatian Ministry of Culture advised the petitioners to apply for a tender in order to pay the other half. The restored monument was unveiled in December 2010.

== See also ==
- Blagaj massacre
- Ivanci massacre

== Sources ==
- Biondich, Mark (2011). The Balkans: Revolution, War, and Political Violence Since 1878. Oxford, England: Oxford University Press. ISBN 978-0-19-929905-8.
- Cooke, Philip; Shepherd, Ben (2013). European Resistance in the Second World War. Philadelphia, Pennsylvania: Casemate Publishers. ISBN 978-1-4738-3304-3.
- Cox, John K. (2007). "Ante Pavelić and the Ustaša State in Croatia". In Fischer, Bernd Jürgen (ed.). Balkan Strongmen: Dictators and Authoritarian Rulers of South Eastern Europe. West Lafayette, Indiana: Purdue University Press. pp. 199–239. ISBN 978-1-55753-455-2.
- Croatian Ministry of Culture (9 December 2010). "Svečanost u povodu obnove spomenika "Bjelovarac"" (in Serbo-Croatian). Government of Croatia.
- Dizdar, Zdravko (1997). "Kvaternik, Eugen Dido". In Dizdar, Zdravko; Grčić, Marko; Ravlić, Slaven; Stuparić, Darko (eds.). Tko je tko u NDH [Who's Who in the NDH] (in Serbo-Croatian). Zagreb, Croatia: Minerva. ISBN 978-953-6377-03-9.
- Goldstein, Ivo (1999). Croatia: A History. Translated by Nikolina Jovanović. Montreal, Canada: McGill-Queen's University Press. ISBN 978-0-7735-2017-2.
- Goldstein, Ivo (2007). "The Independent State of Croatia in 1941: On the Road to Catastrophe". In Ramet, Sabrina P. (ed.). The Independent State of Croatia 1941–45. London, England: Routledge. pp. 19–30. ISBN 978-1-138-86811-3.
- Goldstein, Slavko (2012). 1941: The Year That Keeps Returning. Translated by Michael Gable (2nd ed.). New York City: New York Review Books. ISBN 978-1-59017-673-3.
- Hoare, Marko Attila (2006). Genocide and Resistance in Hitler's Bosnia: The Partisans and the Chetniks, 1941–1943. Oxford, England: Oxford University Press. ISBN 978-0-19-726380-8.
- Hoare, Marko Attila (2007). The History of Bosnia: From the Middle Ages to the Present Day. London: Saqi. ISBN 978-0-86356-953-1.
- Holocaust Encyclopedia. "Jasenovac". United States Holocaust Memorial Museum.
- Judah, Tim (2000) [1997]. The Serbs: History, Myth and the Destruction of Yugoslavia (2nd ed.). New Haven, Connecticut: Yale University Press. ISBN 978-0-300-08507-5.
- Karaula, Željko (2007). ""Slučaj Gudovac" 28. travnja 1941" ["Gudovac Incident": 28 April 1941]. Journal of the Institute of Croatian History (in Serbo-Croatian). 39. Institute of Croatian History: 197–208. ISSN 0353-295X.
- Konjhadžić, Mahmud (1960). Sjećanja u kamen uklesana: spomenici radničkog pokreta i Narodne revolucije u Hrvatskoj [Memories Carved in Stone: Monuments of the Workers' Movement and People's Revolution in Croatia] (in Serbo-Croatian). Zagreb, Yugoslavia: Ured za informacije Izvršnog vijeća Sabora Narodne Republike Hrvatske. OCLC 655049070.
- Krzak, Andrzej (2006). "Operation "Marita": The Attack Against Yugoslavia in 1941". The Journal of Slavic Military Studies. 19 (3): 543–600. doi:10.1080/13518040600868123. ISSN 1351-8046. S2CID 219625930.
- Lemkin, Raphael (2008). Axis Rule in Occupied Europe. Clark, New Jersey: The Lawbook Exchange. ISBN 978-1-58477-901-8.
- Levy, Michele Frucht (2013). ""The Last Bullet For The Last Serb": The Ustaša Genocide Against Serbs, 1941–1945". In Crowe, David M. (ed.). Crimes of State Past and Present: Government-Sponsored Atrocities and International Legal Responses. London, England: Routledge. pp. 54–85. ISBN 978-1-317-98682-9.
- Pavlowitch, Stevan K. (2008). Hitler's New Disorder: The Second World War in Yugoslavia. New York City: Columbia University Press. ISBN 978-1-85065-895-5.
- Milekić, Sven (28 October 2016). "Croatian Minister Praised WWII Fascist Official". Balkan Insight.
- Ramet, Sabrina P. (2006). The Three Yugoslavias: State-Building and Legitimation, 1918–2005. Bloomington, Indiana: Indiana University Press. ISBN 978-0-253-34656-8.
- Roberts, Walter R. (1973). Tito, Mihailović and the Allies 1941–1945. Durham, North Carolina: Duke University Press. ISBN 978-0-8223-0773-0.
- Singleton, Frederick Bernard (1985). A Short History of the Yugoslav Peoples. Cambridge, England: Cambridge University Press. ISBN 978-0-521-27485-2.
- Terzić, Velimir (1982). Slom Kraljevine Jugoslavije 1941: Uzroci i posledice poraza [The Collapse of the Kingdom of Yugoslavia in 1941: Causes and Consequences of Defeat] (PDF) (in Serbo-Croatian). Vol. 2. Belgrade, Yugoslavia: Narodna knjiga. OCLC 10276738.
- Tomasevich, Jozo (1975). War and Revolution in Yugoslavia, 1941–1945: The Chetniks. Stanford, California: Stanford University Press. ISBN 978-0-8047-0857-9.
- Tomasevich, Jozo (2001). War and Revolution in Yugoslavia, 1941–1945: Occupation and Collaboration. Stanford, California: Stanford University Press. ISBN 978-0-8047-3615-2.
- Vladisavljevic, Anja (9 April 2021). "Croatian Street Names Still Bear Names of WWII Fascists". Balkan Insight.
