= Željko Karaula =

Croatian historian (born 1973)

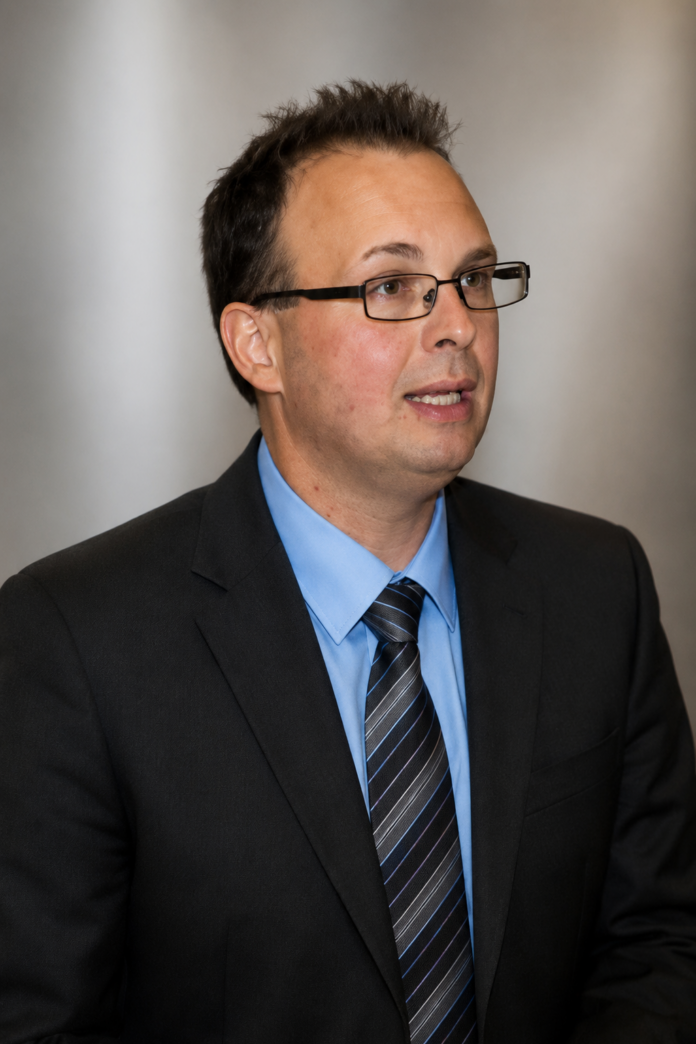
- Željko Karaula in the hall of DANU, 2021
- Born: June 26, 1973 (age 53); Bjelovar, SR Croatia, SFR Yugoslavia
- Citizenship: Croatian
- Education: University of Zagreb
- Occupation: Historian
- Known for: Research on modern Croatian history, Croatian Academy of Sciences and Arts (HAZU) (external associate)

Željko Karaula (Bjelovar, June 26, 1973) is a Croatian historian and author. His scientific focus is on modern Croatian and Yugoslavian history, particularly the history of his hometown and the surrounding area. He promotes the development of Croatian-Montenegrin scientific-cultural values.

== Early life ==
Željko Karaula was born in 1973 in Bjelovar, where he went to the School of Economics. After a year spent in the Faculty of Law in Zagreb, he enrolled and graduated from the Faculty of Philosophy of the University of Zagreb, gaining the title of professor of history and philosophy. After graduation he worked at Veliko Trojstvo Primary School near Bjelovar as a history teacher.

== Career ==
He started his career as an author in 1997 by publishing a collection of songs titled Vodena krila (Water Wings). In 2006, he became a director of a marketing, service, and catering company called ALCA d.o.o. Bjelovar.

He enrolled in postgraduate history studies in 2008 in the Croatian Studies department of the University of Zagreb. In 2011 he won a scholarship from the Montenegrin government for scientific research. His doctoral dissertation was Hrvatska seljačka zaštita u Kraljevini Jugoslaviji (Croatian peasant protection in the Kingdom of Yugoslavia), defended under the mentorship of Dr. Ivica Miškulin in 2015. In 2016, he was named a scientific associate, and two years later he received the Pečat grada Bjelovara (Seal of Bjelovar) prize for science. That same year, 2018, he received a prize from the Montenegrin Faculty for Literature and Linguistics in Cetinje for his contributions in nurturing Croatian-Montenegrin scientific relations.

He is an active associate of the Croatian Academy of Sciences and Arts in Bjelovar, where he is the leader of the Povijest gradova Bjelovarsko-bilogorske županije (History of the Towns of the Bjelovarsko-bilogorska County) project. He studied at the Institute for History (Sarajevo) and the Ivo Pilar Institute in Zagreb and performed research for CASA Bjelovar and the Dukljanska akademija znanosti i umjetnosti (DANU), as well as for the Montenegrin community of Croatia in archives located in Vienna, Budapest, Maribor, Belgrade, Podgorica, Cetinje, Prague, and others.

He is an associate of the DANU in Podgorica. Since 2016 he has been the main editor of a publication by the Matica hrvatska branch in Daruvar titled Zbornik Janković and a vice-president of that branch. He is also a member of the editorial board of the publication Radovi Zavoda HAZU Bjelovar. He is a member of the Družba Braća hrvatskog zmaja – Zmajski stol Bjelovar (League of Brothers of the Croatian Dragon – Dragon Table Bjelovar). The aims of this league are the spreading of patriotic, cultural, culturological, national, popular, scientific, and artistic values.

In late 2025, Karaula published a comprehensive biographical monograph titled Lenjin – crveni diktator (Lenin – Red Dictator), released by Naklada Breza. The book offers a historiographical portrait of Vladimir Lenin, navigating between his role as an advocate for the underprivileged and his fanatical adherence to a Marxist ideal implemented through mass terror. The work incorporates historical documents regarding Lenin's activities and his life in Siberian exile, and it has been noted as a significant research step within regional historiography. The monograph received extensive coverage in Croatian media, including feature reviews and comprehensive interviews with the author in major publications such as Express magazine.

== Controversy ==
His 2015 book Mačekova vojska – hrvatska seljačka zaštita u Kraljevini Jugoslaviji generated scholarly discussion within Croatian historiographical circles by challenging the traditionally emphasized pacifist nature of the Croatian Peasant Party (HSS) and highlighting the militaristic aspects of the peasant movement. Some researchers noted that the Peasant Protection (Zaštita) played a more significant role in assisting the Ustaše movement during their assumption of power following the collapse of Yugoslavia in April 1941, suggesting a greater pre-war infiltration of Ustaše elements within its ranks than previously acknowledged.

At the beginning of 2020, there was a dispute between Željko Karaula and the Catholic Church in Croatia because Karaula edited a transcript of diary entries by the Archbishop Alojzije Stepinac (1934-1945) created by UDBA in the 1950s, which were kept in the Croatian State Archives and became publicly available around the end of 2017. Despot Infinitus published the book in Zagreb. The Church thought the diary to be the property of the archdiocese in Zagreb, to which Karaula responded that he only published archival materials from the Stepinac file kept in the archives: "These are publicly available materials for research, and it is not required to seek any permit by the archdiocese in Zagreb to publish such material."

Regarding his 2022 comprehensive biography Sekula Drljević (1884-1945) – politička biografija, published by the Montenegrin Cultural Forum and DANU, academician Šerbo Rastoder of the Montenegrin Academy of Sciences and Arts (CANU) described it as one of the best biographical studies of a 20th-century Montenegrin politician, characterizing the work as a "triumph of historical science."

== Scientific monographs - selection ==
- HANAO - Hrvatska nacionalna omladina, Naklada Breza: Zagreb, 2011. ISBN 978-953-7036-62-1
- Moderna povijest Bjelovara 1871–2010. Od razvojačenja Varaždinske krajine do suvremenog Bjelovara, ALCA d.o.o.- Naklada Breza: Bjelovar, 2012. ISBN 978-953-7928-00-1
- Hrvoje, Petrić, Željko, Holjevac, Željko, Karaula, Povijest grada Bjelovara, HAZU Bjelovar-HAZU Zagreb: Zagreb-Bjelovar, 2013. (Ž. Karaula, 247.- 463.) ISBN 978-953-154-183-1
- Mačekova vojska. Hrvatska seljačka zaštita u Kraljevini Jugoslaviji, Despot infinitus d.o.o.: Zagreb, 2015. ISBN 978-953-7892-42-5
- Rudolf Bićanić – intelektualac, ideolog, antifašist, ekonomist, HAZU - Zavod HAZU Bjelovar: Zagreb-Bjelovar, 2018. ISBN 978-953-347-212-6
- Povijest Grubišnog Polja, HAZU Bjelovar – HAZU Zagreb: Zagreb-Bjelovar, 2019. ISBN 978-953-347-267-6
- Političke prilike i Domovinski rat u Daruvaru (1990.-1995.), Ogranak MH Daruvar: Daruvar, 2020. ISBN 978-953-97096-6-0
- Ratni put 105. bjelovarske brigade HV, Udruga 105. brigade Hrvatske vojske, Bjelovar, 2020. ISBN 978-953-59195-2-0
- Sekula Drljević: 1884.-1945.: Politička biografija, Crnogorski kulturni forum - DANU, Cetinje, 2022. ISBN 978-9940-554-99-6
- Lenin. Red Dictator, Naklada Breza, Zagreb, 2025.ISBN 978-953-8139-85-7

== Web ==
- Library of Congress.
- British Library.
