= Gudovac =

- Village
- Interactive map of Gudovac
- Location of Gudovac in Croatia
- Coordinates: 45°52′52″N 16°47′07″E
- Country: Croatia
- Region: Croatia proper
- County: Bjelovar-Bilogora County
- Municipality: Bjelovar

Area
  - Total: 24.5 km^{2} (9.5 sq mi)

Population (2021)
  - Total: 875
  - Density: 35.7/km^{2} (92.5/sq mi)
- Time zone: UTC+1 (CET)
  - Summer (DST): UTC+2 (CEST)

Gudovac is a rural suburb of the city of Bjelovar, it lies approximately 5 kilometres (3.1 mi) from the city centre and about 80 kilometres (50 mi) east of the Croatian capital of Zagreb.

== History ==
Gudovac was first settled during the Middle Ages and had an ethnically mixed population through much of its history. In 1931, Gudovac had 1,073 inhabitants living in 330 households. Croats formed two-thirds of the population, while the remaining inhabitants were ethnic Serbs. The Gudovac municipality had a population of 8,000, including 3,000 Serbs.

On 28 April 1941, during World War II, the village was the site of a massacre of up to 196 Bjelovar Serbs by the fascist, Croatian nationalist Ustaše movement. It was the first massacre committed by the Ustaše upon coming to power.

In 2010, the remains of approximately 30 people believed to date from World War II were discovered in a pit near the settlement.

== Demographics ==
According to the 2021 census, its population was 875.
