= Kieselstein Castle =

Castle in Slovenia

Coordinates: 46°14′18.21″N 14°21′15.69″E

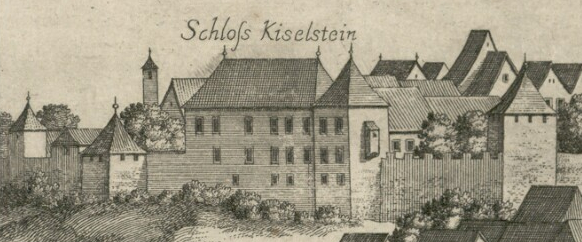
Kieselstein Castle in a 1679 engraving by Valvasor

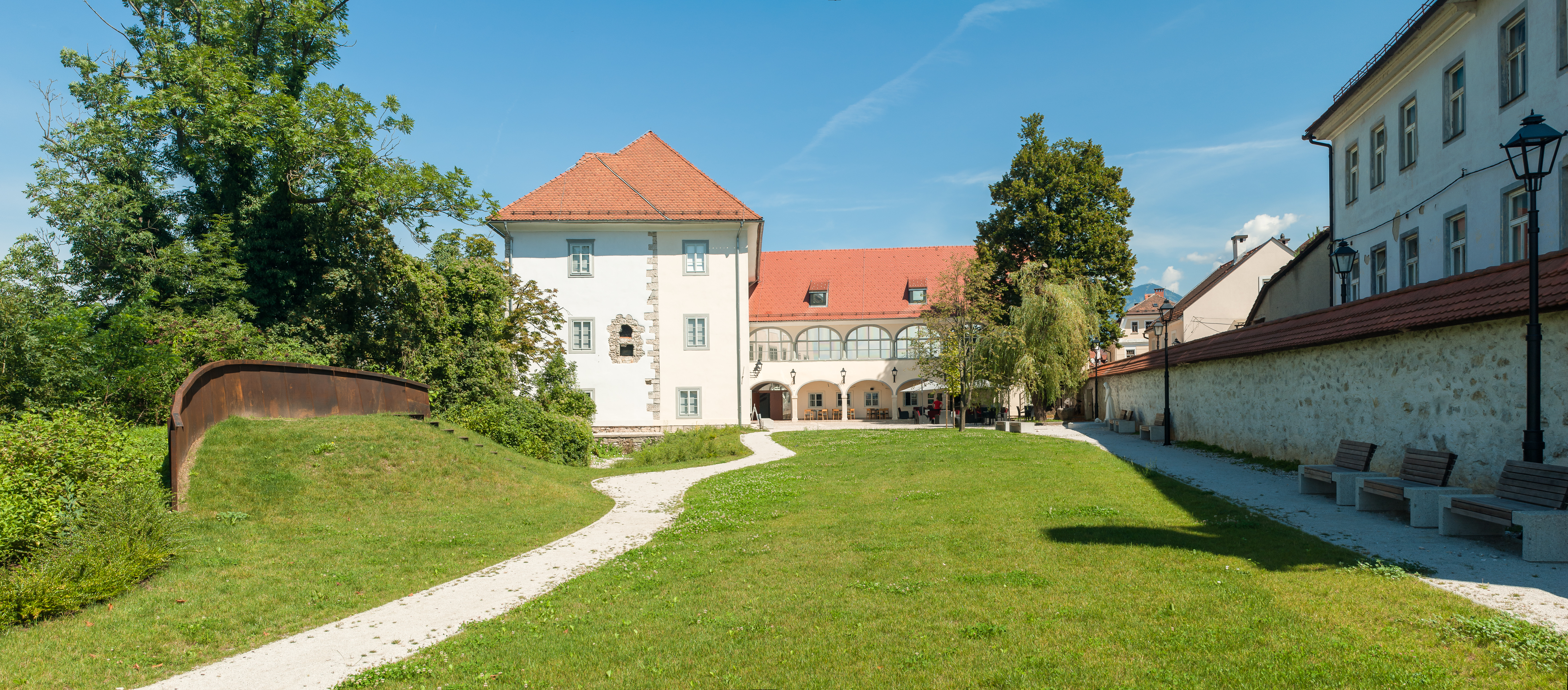
Kieselstein Castle in 2014

Kieselstein Castle, also known as Khislstein, (Slovene: Grad Kieselstein / Khislstein) is a 13th-century castle in the city of Kranj, in the Upper Carniola region of Slovenia.

The castle stands at what was once a defensible point, guarding the city pier and crossing over the river Sava, and was predated on the site by a round 11th-century keep. The current structure was built in 1256 by the Counts of Ortenburg, by an arrangement with the lord of Kranj, Ulrich III, Duke of Carinthia. Until 1420, the tower was managed by their ministeriales or vassals, the knights von Chreinburch; in that year, it passed to Count Hermann II of Celje. During the period of Turkish incursions, the tower was incorporated into the city walls. After the extinction of the Counts of Celje in 1456, it was inherited by the Habsburgs, who sold it in the mid 16th century to Baron Hans Khiessl. Khiessl successfully petitioned Emperor Ferdinand I for the right to rename the castle after himself, and also expanded the tower into an L-shaped castle, giving it its present appearance.

The Khiessls soon sold the castle to Franz von Moscon; later owners included the Ravbar, Apfaltrer, Auersperg and finally Natalis Pagliaruzzi noble families. In 1913 the castle was purchased by the state. Between the world wars, it housed government offices; after World War II it was (somewhat redundantly) nationalized. In 1952, the building was renovated according to plans drawn up by the architect Jože Plečnik.

Today the renovated building houses the Kranj Municipal Agency for the Protection of Natural and Cultural Heritage, as well as the Upper Carniola Museum.

== Sources ==
- Kranj municipal site
- http://www.slosi.info/01gradovi/02podrobnejse/gorenjska/k-2/kiselstajn.php
- Satellite photo of castle
