= D506 road =

Road in Croatia

D506 state road

Route information
- Length: 27.2 km (16.9 mi)

Major junctions
- From: D218 near Donji Lapac
- To: D1 near Gračac

Location
- Country: Croatia
- Counties: Lika-Senj, Zadar

Highway system
- Highways in Croatia

D508 is a state road in Lika region of Croatia connecting D218 state road near Donji Lapac to the D1 state road near Gračac and further on to the A1 motorway Sveti Rok interchange. The road is 27.2 km (16.9 mi) long.

The road, as well as all other state roads in Croatia, is managed and maintained by Hrvatske ceste, a state-owned company.

== Traffic volume ==
Traffic is regularly counted and reported by Hrvatske ceste (HC), operator of the road.

D506 traffic volume
Road	Counting site	AADT	ASDT	Notes
D506	4923 Mazin south	191	328	Adjacent to the D1 junction.

== Road junctions and populated areas ==
D506 junctions/populated areas
Type	Slip roads/Notes
	D218 to Srb (to the south) and to Donji Lapac and Užljebić border crossing to Bihać, Bosnia and Herzegovina(to the north). The northern terminus of the road.
	Dobroselo
	Mazin
	D1 to Udbina (to the north) and to Gračac and the A1 motorway Sveti Rok interchange (to the north). The southern terminus of the road.

== See also ==
- State roads in Croatia
- Hrvatske ceste
