= Tišma =

Tišma may refer to:

- Aleksandar Tišma (1924–2003), Serbian novelist
- Andrej Tišma (born in 1952), Serbian artist
- Boris Tišma (born 2002), Croatian basketball player
- Jovan Tišma (born 1969), Serbian politician
- Slobodan Tišma (born 1946), Serbian musician and writer
- Smilja Tišma (born ca. 1929), Serbian child war victim and politician

== See also ==
- Tišma, a hamlet of Kestenovac, Lika-Senj County, Croatia
- Tišme, a hamlet of Birovača, Lika-Senj County
- Tišme, a hamlet of Dnopolje, Lika-Senj County
- Gornje Tišme and Donje Tišme, hamlets of Ivoševci, Šibenik-Knin County, Croatia
