= Užljebić =

- Hamlet
- Location within Croatia
- Coordinates: 44.713897°N 15.92798°E
- Country: Croatia
- County: Lika-Senj County
- Municipality: Donji Lapac
- Time zone: UTC+1 (CET)
  - Summer (DST): UTC+2 (CEST)

Užljebić is a hamlet in Croatia, located on the border with Bosnia and Herzegovina near Ripač. It is a border crossing and the endpoint of the D218 highway. It has no recorded population, and the closest settlement is Nebljusi to the south.

In 2009, the Užljebić border crossing was used for the entry of 39,897 passengers and 19,232 vehicles into the Republic of Croatia, while 38,273 passengers and 18,422 vehicles exited through it.
