= Gornji Lapac =

Gornji Lapac Горњи Лапац (Serbian)
- Village
- Location within Croatia
- Coordinates: 44°30′54″N 15°59′36″E
- Country: Croatia
- County: Lika-Senj
- Municipality: Donji Lapac

Area
  - Total: 16.4 km^{2} (6.3 sq mi)
- Elevation: 591 m (1,939 ft)

Population (2021)
  - Total: 45
  - Density: 2.7/km^{2} (7.1/sq mi)
- Time zone: UTC+1 (CET)
  - Summer (DST): UTC+2 (CEST)
- Postal code: 53250 Donji Lapac
- Area code: +385 (53)

Gornji Lapac (Serbian Cyrillic: Горњи Лапац) is a village in Croatia.

== Population ==
According to the 2011 census, Gornji Lapac had 57 inhabitants.

Population
1857	1869	1880	1890	1900	1910	1921	1931	1948	1953	1961	1971	1981	1991	2001	2011
730	858	791	567	529	385	348	429	97	112	143	99	187	194	32	57

Note: Gornji Lapac was independent settlement till 1948, then part of settlement (hamlet) of the settlement of Gajine, and then from 1981 independent settlement again.

=== 1991 census ===
According to the 1991 census, settlement of Gornji Lapac had 194 inhabitants, which were ethnically declared as this:

Gornji Lapac
1991
total: 194
1. Serbs 179 (92.3%)
2. Yugoslavs 9 (4.63%)
3. Croats 6 (3.09%)

=== Austro-hungarian 1910 census ===
According to the 1910 census, settlement of Gornji Lapac had 385 inhabitants in 2 hamlets, which were linguistically and religiously declared as this:

Population by language	Croatian or Serbian
Gornji Lapac	348
Visočica	37
Total	385 (100%)

Population by religion	Eastern Orthodox	Roman Catholics
Gornji Lapac	160	188
Visočica	37	-
Total	197 (51.16%)	188 (48.83%)

== Literature ==
- Savezni zavod za statistiku i evidenciju FNRJ i SFRJ, popis stanovništva 1948, 1953, 1961, 1971, 1981. i 1991. godine.
- Knjiga: "Narodnosni i vjerski sastav stanovništva Hrvatske, 1880-1991: po naseljima, author: Jakov Gelo, izdavač: Državni zavod za statistiku Republike Hrvatske, 1998., ISBN 953-6667-07-X, ISBN 978-953-6667-07-9;
