= Boričevac massacre =

- Location: Boričevac
- Date: 2 August 1941
- Target: Croats
- Attack type: Mass murder
- Deaths: 55–179
- Perpetrators: Yugoslav Partisans, Chetniks

The Boričevac massacre was the massacre of Croat civilians in the village of Boričevac, committed by Serb rebels on 2 August 1941, during the Srb uprising.

== Prelude ==
In the weeks prior to the Srb Uprising, local Serb civilians had been the victims of Ustaše atrocities.

Throughout July 1941, Ustaše general, Vjekoslav Luburić, ordered the "cleansing" of Serbs from the Donji Lapac area in Lika and the bordering regions of Bosanska Krajina. During this time, hundreds of Serb men, women and children were arrested and killed by Ustaše forces. Many of the bodies were dumped into pits and caves, which included a pit near to the village of Boričevac. Other bodies were mutilated and left on display, so as to encourage other Serbs to flee the area. Homes in Serb villages were burned and looted.

A small number of local Croats, including those from Boričevac and other areas, had been complicit in Ustaše crimes. However, the majority of Croats did not take part in such crimes, many moderate Croats were opposed to them and actively tried to help their Serb neighbours.

On 27 July 1941, local Serbs launched an uprising against Ustaše authorities. Throughout July, August and September 1941, Croat and Muslim villages across Lika and Western Bosnia were attacked and massacred by Serb insurgents, such killings were said to have been acts of retaliation for earlier Ustaše massacres against Serbs.

== Incident ==
On 2 August 1941, Serb insurgents entered Boričevac; said to have been angered after discovering the remains of Serb victims killed by the Ustaše, the insurgents killed the remaining Croat civilians, all of whom were elderly, women or children, that had not been able to flee. The village was burned the ground, the village's Catholic church was looted and destroyed. Surrounding villages were also burned and massacred.

Sources differ as to whether the Serb insurgents were Chetniks or Yugoslav Partisans.

At least 55 Croat civilians were massacred, but other sources cite up to 179 civilian victims. About 2,000 of Boričevac's residents fled beforehand to Kulen Vakuf.

== Aftermath ==
Croats that survived the massacre, and those who fled from Boričevac, were eventually settled in the area around Bjelovar. Under the Communist period, they were forbidden to return to Boričevac. Most were able not return to their homes until the end of the Croatian War of Independence.

In contemporary Croatia, the commemoration of the Srb uprising is seen as controversial, with polarising opinions between Croats and Serbs. Serbs see the uprising as a testament to Serb anti-fascist resistance against Ustaše terror, while some Croats see the uprising as a revolt by Serb nationalists who murdered Croat civilians. Max Bergholz argues that due to the controversy surrounding the nature of the Srb Uprising (the involvement of Yugoslav Partisans with the Serb insurgents) and the post-war narrative within Yugoslavia of not confronting the crimes committed between the different Yugoslav ethnic groups, that Croat and Muslim victims of Chetnik and other insurgent massacres have not yet been appropriately commemorated.

== Sources ==
- Bergholz, Max (2012). None of us Dared Say Anything: Mass Killing in a Bosnian Community during World War Two and the Postwar Culture of Silence (PDF) (PhD). University of Toronto. hdl:1807/33800.
- Dizdar, Zdravko; Sobolevski, Mihajlo (1999). Prešućivani četnički zločini u Hrvatskoj i u Bosni i Hercegovini 1941–1945 [Suppressed Chetnik Crimes in Croatia and Bosnia and Herzegovina 1941–1945]. Zagreb: Croatian Institute of History. ISBN 978-953-6491-28-5.
- Dizdar, Zdravko (1996). "Chetnik Genocidal Crimes Against Croatians and Muslims in Bosnia. and Herzegovina and Against Croatians in Croatia During World War II". Hic.hr. Archived from the original on 3 March 2006.
- Goldstein, Slavko (2013). 1941: The Year That Keeps Returning. New York Review of Books. ISBN 9781590177006.
- Tomasevich, Jozo (2001). War and Revolution in Yugoslavia, 1941–1945: Occupation and Collaboration. Stanford: Stanford University Press. ISBN 978-0-8047-7924-1.
