= Kestenovac =

Kestenovac may refer to:

- Kestenovac, Lika-Senj County, a village near Donji Lapac, Croatia
- Kestenovac, Karlovac County, a village near Vojnić, Croatia
