= Tisma =

Tisma may refer to:

- Tisma, Nicaragua, a municipality in the Masaya department
- Tišma, a Serbian surname

== See also ==
- Tisma Lagoon Natural Reserve, a protected area of Nicaragua
