= Srđo Komazec =

Serbian politician (born 1958)

Srđo Komazec (Serbian Cyrillic: Срђо Комазец; born 17 October 1958) is a Serbian politician. He has served in the National Assembly of Serbia and the Assembly of Vojvodina and was the mayor of Stara Pazova from 2004 to 2008. Komazec is a member of the far-right Serbian Radical Party (SRS).

== Early life and career ==
Komazec was born in Zemun in the city of Belgrade, in what was then the People's Republic of Serbia in the Federal People's Republic of Yugoslavia. He is a graduated civil engineer and has worked as an urban planner and construction inspector in Stara Pazova. He has also worked in private business.

A 2007 profile described Komazec as having a quiet and withdrawn personality. Some journalists visiting Stara Pazova were surprised that he paid for a business lunch with them on his own, rather than billing the municipality in his capacity as mayor.

== Politician ==
=== Early terms in the provincial assembly (1992–2000) ===
Komazec was elected for Stara Pazova's second division in the May 1992 Vojvodina provincial election, the first to be held after the re-introduction of multi-party democracy to Serbia. He was one of three SRS delegates elected to the assembly; the Socialist Party of Serbia (SPS) won a majority victory, and he served in opposition.

The Radical Party increased its representation to six seats in the December 1992 provincial election. Re-elected in Stara Pazova, Komazec served as a deputy president of the assembly in the term that followed. In 1993, he and fellow deputy president Savo Stupar wrote a letter to the Yugoslavian federal government warning that the price of wheat as determined by Serbia and Yugoslavia could not "cover the minimum production costs" of Vojvodina farmers and that the sale of wheat was therefore "being conducted with difficulty and delays."

He was re-elected to a third term in the 1996 Vojvodina provincial election, in which the Radical Party won seven seats. The Socialist Party continued to govern the province throughout this period.

SPS leader Slobodan Milošević was defeated by Democratic Opposition of Serbia (DOS) candidate Vojislav Koštunica in the 2000 Yugoslavian presidential election, a watershed moment in the political life of Serbia and Yugoslavia. Komazec appeared in the fourth position on the Radical Party's electoral list for Sremska Mitrovica in the concurrent Yugoslavian parliamentary vote; the party won a single seat in the division, which went to lead candidate Srđan Nikolić. The Radicals were badly defeated in this election overall, falling to only five seats in the Chamber of Citizens.

Komazec was defeated by a DOS candidate in the 2000 Vojvodina provincial election and ran unsuccessfully for the Stara Pazova assembly in the 2000 Serbian local elections, both of which were held at the same time as the Yugoslavian vote.

=== Out of office (2000–04) ===
Serbia held a new parliamentary election in December 2000, after the fall of Milošević. Prior to the vote, Serbia's electoral laws were reformed such that the entire country became a single electoral division and all mandates were awarded to candidates on successful lists at the discretion of the sponsoring parties or coalitions, irrespective of numerical order. Komazec received the 237th position (out of 250) on the Radical Party's list; the party won twenty-three seats, and he was not given a mandate.

Komazec ran for Stara Pazova's sixteenth division in a 2003 local by-election. The outcome of the election is not available online, although Komazec does not appear in a list of local assembly members made available on the Stara Pazova website in 2004.

=== Parliamentarian, provincial representative, mayor (2004–08) ===
Komazec received the fifty-first position on the Radical Party's list in the 2003 parliamentary election. The party won eighty-two seats, and he was awarded a mandate when the assembly convened in January 2004. Although the Radicals won more seats than any other party, they fell short of a majority and ultimately served in opposition. Komazec was a member of the committee for finance and the committee for urbanism and construction.

Serbia introduced the direct election of mayors in the 2004 Serbian local elections, and Komazec was elected as the mayor of Stara Pazova in the second round of voting. He was also re-elected to the Vojvodina assembly for the redistributed Stara Pazova division in the concurrent 2004 provincial election. The Democratic Party (DS) and its allies won the provincial vote, and the Radicals once again served in opposition in the Vojvodina assembly.

The Radicals formed a coalition government with the Socialists and the Democratic Party of Serbia (DSS) in Stara Pazova. As mayor, Komazec attracted controversy (including from members of his own coalition) by refusing an Austrian company's request to convert agricultural land to an industrial zone for investment in the municipality. The Strength of Serbia Movement (PSS) joined the governing coalition in 2007, after the DSS withdrew.

Komazec appeared in the 126th position on the 2007 Serbian parliamentary election and was not given a new mandate when the list won eighty-one seats.

The direct election of mayors proved to be a short-lived experiment and was abandoned after a single term. Since 2008, Serbian mayors have been chosen by members of the local assemblies, who are elected by proportional representation. Komazec led the Radical Party's list for Stara Pazova in the 2008 local elections; the party narrowly won the popular vote, but the second-place Democratic Party formed a new coalition government, and Komazec served in opposition for the term that followed. He was defeated in Stara Pazova in the 2008 provincial election.

The Radical Party experienced a serious split in late 2008, with several members joining the more moderate Serbian Progressive Party (SNS) under the leadership of Tomislav Nikolić and Aleksandar Vučić. Komazec remained with the Radicals.

=== After 2008 ===
Serbia's electoral system was again reformed in 2011, such that all mandates in elections held under proportional representation were awarded to candidates on successful lists in numerical order. Komazec received the 172nd position on the Radical Party's list in the 2012 parliamentary election and the eighty-eighth position in the 2014 parliamentary election. The party fell below the electoral threshold for assembly representation on both occasions.

Komazec led the SRS's list for Stara Pazova in the 2012 Serbian local elections and was re-elected. Weakened by the split four years earlier, the Radicals won only four out of forty-eight seats in the municipality. He ran for the Stara Pazova constituency seat in the concurrent 2012 provincial election and finished fifth.

The SRS again won four seats in Stara Pazova in the 2016 local elections, finishing a distant second against the coalition led by the Progressive Party. Komazec was re-elected at the head of the Radical list and served another four-year term in opposition. He led the list once more in the 2020 local elections and was not re-elected when the list fell below the electoral threshold.

Vojvodina adopted a system of full proportional representation for the 2016 provincial election. Komazec received the twenty-third position on the SRS list and was not elected when the list won ten mandates. He was promoted to the seventeenth position in the 2020 provincial election and again missed election when the seat fell to four seats.

Komazec appeared in the fifty-second position on the Radical Party's list in the 2022 Serbian parliamentary election. The list again failed to cross the threshold.

== Electoral record ==
=== Provincial (Vojvodina) ===
2012 Vojvodina provincial election: Stara Pazova
Candidate	Party	First round		Second round	
Candidate	Party	Votes	%	Votes	%
Dušan Inđić (incumbent)	"Choice for a Better Vojvodina–Bojan Pajtic" (Affiliation: Democratic Party)	5,806	19.78	12,365	50.43
Milan Beara	Coalition: Let's Get Vojvodina Moving–Tomislav Nikolić (Serbian Progressive Party, New Serbia, Movement of Socialists, Strength of Serbia Movement) (Affiliation: Serbian Progressive Party)	7,646	26.05	12,154	49.57
Ljubomir Milanović	Coalition: Socialist Party of Serbia (SPS), Party of United Pensioners of Serbia (PUPS), United Serbia (JS), Social Democratic Party of Serbia (SDP Serbia)	3,783	12.89		
Miloš Crnomarković	Democratic Party of Serbia	3,568	12.16		
Srđo Komazec	Serbian Radical Party	3,146	10.72		
Nineta Vajđik	League of Social Democrats of Vojvodina–Nenad Čanak	1,965	6.70		
Nenad Radaković	Citizens' Group: Dveri Serbian Vojvodina	1,851	6.31		
Miloš Pavlović	Coalition: United Regions of Serbia–Mijodrag Mojić	1,583	5.39		
Total		29,348	100.00	24,519	100.00

2008 Vojvodina provincial election: Stara Pazova
Candidate	Party	First round		Second round	
Candidate	Party	Votes	%	Votes	%
Dušan Inđić	Coalition: For a European Vojvodina, Democratic Party–G17 Plus, Boris Tadić (Affiliation: Democratic Party)	11,442	36.57	8,837	57.35
Srđo Komazec (incumbent)	Serbian Radical Party	11,848	37.87	6,572	42.65
Dr. Rada Inđić	Coalition: Socialist Party of Serbia–Party of United Pensioners of Serbia (Affiliation: Socialist Party of Serbia)	3,142	10.04		
Miroslav Jovanović	Coalition: Democratic Party of Serbia–New Serbia–Vojislav Koštunica (Affiliation: New Serbia)	2,677	8.56		
Dr. Biljana Maksimović	Liberal Democratic Party	2,175	6.95		
Total		31,284	100.00	15,409	100.00
Valid votes		31,284	67.00	1,306	80.92
Invalid/blank votes		15,409	33.00	308	19.08
Total votes		46,693	100.00	1,614	100.00

2004 Vojvodina provincial election: Stara Pazova
Candidate	Party	First round		Second round	
Candidate	Party	Votes	%	Votes	%
Srđo Komazec	Serbian Radical Party	4,945	30.15	8,837	58.89
Radosav Gvozdić (incumbent)	"Democratic Party–Boris Tadić"	3,602	21.96	6,170	41.11
Sofija Španović	Democratic Party of Serbia	2,025	12.35		
Jaroslav Hrebik	G17 Plus	1,650	10.06		
Dušan Inđić	Citizens' Group	1,364	8.32		
Ilija Marković	Strength of Serbia Movement	1,067	6.51		
Nikola Klašnić	Socialist Party of Serbia	942	5.74		
Milan Jovanović	Serbian Renewal Movement–New Serbia–Đorđe Kolarević	806	4.91		
Total		16,401	100.00	15,007	100.00
Valid votes		16,401	95.70	15,007	96.63
Invalid/blank votes		737	4.30	524	3.37
Total votes		17,138	100.00	15,531	100.00

2000 Vojvodina provincial election: Stara Pazova Division 2
Candidate	Party
Radosav Gvozdić (ELECTED)	Democratic Opposition of Serbia (Affiliation: Democratic Party)
Srđo Komazec (incumbent)	Serbian Radical Party
other candidates	
Total

1996 Vojvodina provincial election: Stara Pazova Division 2
Candidate	Party
Srđo Komazec (incumbent) (ELECTED)	Serbian Radical Party
other candidates	
Total

December 1992 Vojvodina provincial election: Stara Pazova Division 2
Candidate	Party
Srđo Komazec (incumbent) (ELECTED)	Serbian Radical Party
Radosav Gvozdić	Serb Democratic Party
Nenad Mađarević	Democratic Movement of Serbia
Marija Rodić	Socialist Party of Serbia
Total
Source: All candidates except Komazec are listed alphabetically.

May 1992 Vojvodina provincial election: Stara Pazova Division 2 (Second Round)
Candidate	Party
Srđo Komazec (ELECTED)	Serbian Radical Party
Nikola Milan	Socialist Party of Serbia
Total

=== Local (Stara Pazova) ===
2004 Municipality of Stara Pazova local election: Mayor of Stara Pazova
Candidate	Party	First round		Second round	
Candidate	Party	Votes	%	Votes	%
Srđo Komazec	Serbian Radical Party			8,566	56.54
Jovan Tišma (incumbent)	Democratic Party			6,583	43.46
other candidates					
Total				15,149	100.00

2003 Municipality of Stara Pazova local by-election: Division 16
Candidate	Party
Srđo Komazec (SEEMINGLY DEFEATED)	Serbian Radical Party
other candidates	
Total

2000 Municipality of Stara Pazova local election: Division 17
Candidate	Party
Srđo Komazec (DEFEATED)	Serbian Radical Party
other candidates	
Total
