= Mišljenovac, Croatia =

Mišljenovac Мишљеновац (Serbian)
- Village
- Location within Croatia
- Coordinates: 44°34′52″N 16°00′34″E
- Country: Croatia
- County: Lika-Senj
- Municipality: Donji Lapac

Area
  - Total: 18.3 km^{2} (7.1 sq mi)
- Elevation: 578 m (1,896 ft)

Population (2021)
  - Total: 0
  - Density: 0.0/km^{2} (0.0/sq mi)
- Time zone: UTC+1 (CET)
  - Summer (DST): UTC+2 (CEST)
- Postal code: 53250 Donji Lapac
- Area code: +385 (53)

Mišljenovac (Serbian Cyrillic: Мишљеновац) is a village in Croatia.

== Population ==
According to the 2011 census, Mišljenovac had 3 inhabitants.

Population
| 1857 | 1869 | 1880 | 1890 | 1900 | 1910 | 1921 | 1931 | 1948 | 1953 | 1961 | 1971 | 1981 | 1991 | 2001 | 2011 |
| 0 | 0 | 0 | 257 | 327 | 451 | 509 | 470 | 432 | 401 | 296 | 245 | 122 | 62 | 2 | 3 |

Note: From 1857-1880 data is include in the settlements of Boričevac, Dnopolje and Kruge.

=== 1991 census ===
According to the 1991 census, settlement of Mišljenovac had 62 inhabitants, which were ethnically declared as this:

Mišljenovac
1991
total: 62
1. Serbs 61 (98.4%)
2. Yugoslavs 1 (1.61%)

=== Austro-hungarian 1910 census ===
According to the 1910 census, settlement of Mišljenovac had 451 inhabitants in 4 hamlets, which were linguistically and religiously declared as this:

| Population by language | Croatian or Serbian |
|---|---|
| Kestenova Korita | 123 |
| Lažipolje | 33 |
| Mišljenovac | 244 |
| Oreškova Poljana | 51 |
| Total | 451 (100%) |

| Population by religion | Eastern Orthodox | Roman Catholics |
|---|---|---|
| Kestenova Korita | 123 | - |
| Lažipolje | 32 | 1 |
| Mišljenovac | 187 | 57 |
| Oreškova Poljana | 51 | - |
| Total | 393 (87.13%) | 58 (12.86%) |

== Literature ==
- Savezni zavod za statistiku i evidenciju FNRJ i SFRJ, popis stanovništva 1948, 1953, 1961, 1971, 1981. i 1991. godine.
- Knjiga: "Narodnosni i vjerski sastav stanovništva Hrvatske, 1880-1991: po naseljima, autor: Jakov Gelo, izdavač: Državni zavod za statistiku Republike Hrvatske, 1998., ISBN 953-6667-07-X, ISBN 978-953-6667-07-9;
