= Dobroselo =

Dobroselo Добросело (Serbian)
- Village
- Location within Croatia
- Coordinates: 44°28′56″N 16°02′59″E
- Country: Croatia
- County: Lika-Senj
- Municipality: Donji Lapac

Area
  - Total: 21.2 km^{2} (8.2 sq mi)
- Elevation: 555 m (1,821 ft)

Population (2021)
  - Total: 76
  - Density: 3.6/km^{2} (9.3/sq mi)
- Time zone: UTC+1 (CET)
  - Summer (DST): UTC+2 (CEST)
- Postal code: 53252 Doljani
- Area code: +385 (53)

Dobroselo (Serbian Cyrillic: Добросело) is a village in Croatia. It is connected by the D218 highway.

== Population ==
According to the 2011 census, Dobroselo had 117 inhabitants.

Population
1857	1869	1880	1890	1900	1910	1921	1931	1948	1953	1961	1971	1981	1991	2001	2011
1.062	1.132	889	1.113	891	811	849	782	488	509	418	325	230	234	94	117

Note: From 1857-1880 include part of data for the settlement of Doljani.

=== 1991 census ===
According to the 1991 census, settlement of Dobroselo had 234 inhabitants, which were ethnically declared as this:

Dobroselo
1991
total: 234
1. Serbs 234 (100.0%)

=== Austro-hungarian 1910 census ===
According to the 1910 census, settlement of Dobroselo had 811 inhabitants in 4 hamlets, which were linguistically and religiously declared as this:

Population by language	Croatian or Serbian
Babin Kraj	169
Dobroselo	514
Dobroselska Prisjeka	25
Dobroselski Bubanj	103
Total	811 (100%)

Population by religion	Eastern Orthodox	Roman Catholics
Babin Kraj	169	-
Dobroselo	513	1
Dobroselska Prisjeka	25	-
Dobroselski Bubanj	103	-
Total	810 (99.87%)	1 (0.12%)

== Literature ==
- Savezni zavod za statistiku i evidenciju FNRJ i SFRJ, popis stanovništva 1948, 1953, 1961, 1971, 1981. i 1991. godine.
- Knjiga: "Narodnosni i vjerski sastav stanovništva Hrvatske, 1880-1991: po naseljima, author: Jakov Gelo, izdavač: Državni zavod za statistiku Republike Hrvatske, 1998., ISBN 953-6667-07-X, ISBN 978-953-6667-07-9;
