= Doljani, Donji Lapac =

Doljani Дољани (Serbian)
- Village
- Interactive map of Doljani
- Location within Croatia
- Coordinates: 44°28′39″N 16°06′16″E
- Country: Croatia
- County: Lika-Senj
- Municipality: Donji Lapac

Area
  - Total: 38.9 km^{2} (15.0 sq mi)
- Elevation: 596 m (1,955 ft)

Population (2021)
  - Total: 69
  - Density: 1.8/km^{2} (4.6/sq mi)
- Time zone: UTC+1 (CET)
  - Summer (DST): UTC+2 (CEST)
- Postal code: 53252 Doljani
- Area code: +385 (53)

Doljani (Serbian Cyrillic: Дољани) is a village in Croatia.

== Population ==
According to the 2011 census, Doljani had 133 inhabitants.

Doljani: Population trends 1857–2011
v

population	1292	1548	1375	1480	1796	1909	1845	1626	809	763	653	486	373	305	95	133
	1857	1869	1880	1890	1900	1910	1921	1931	1948	1953	1961	1971	1981	1991	2001	2011

Sources: Croatian Bureau of Statistics publications

Note: Until 1931, the name of the settlement was Doljane. From 1857-1880 part of the data is included in the settlement of Dobroselo. Data from census years 1857-1931 (from 1857-1880 data is just calculated) is not totally included for the current part of the settlement (hamlet) of Martin Brod which before World War II was part of Croatia and after the war and small territorial changes and border corrections between that time Yugoslav federal units of Croatia and Bosnia and Herzegovina in the border region in eastern Lika and northwestern Bosnia, became part of Bosnia and Herzegovina.

=== 1991 census ===
According to the 1991 census, settlement of Doljani had 305 inhabitants, which were ethnically declared as this:

Doljani
1991
total: 305
1. Serbs 303 (99.3%)
2. unknown 2 (0.65%)

=== Austro-hungarian 1910 census ===
According to the 1910 census, settlement of Doljani had 1,909 inhabitants in 11 hamlets, which were linguistically and religiously declared as this:

Population by language	Croatian or Serbian
Bakrač	107
Dabina Strana	28
Debeljača	307
Doljane	508
Doljanska Kozjača	62
Doljanski Bubanj	220
Grabova Unka	88
Kamenito Poljice	232
Kosno Poljice	117
Orelj-krš	60
Ravno Poljice	180
Total	1,909 (100%)

Population by religion	Eastern Orthodox	Roman Catholics
Bakrač	107	-
Dabina Strana	28	-
Debeljača	307	-
Doljane	505	3
Doljanska Kozjača	62	-
Doljanski Bubanj	220	-
Grabova Unka	88	-
Kamenito Poljice	232	-
Kosno Poljice	117	-
Orelj-krš	60	-
Ravno Poljice	179	1
Total	1,905 (99.79%)	4 (0.20%)

In the 1910 census, the hamlet of Martin-brod was also part of settlement Doljani, and populatuion data for that hamlet in 1910 census was:

Population by language	Croatian or Serbian
Martin-brod	114
Total	114 (100%)

Population by religion	Eastern Orthodox	Roman Catholics
Martin-brod	113	1
Total	113 (99.12%)	1 (0.87%)

After World War II this hamlet of Martin-brod became a part of the neighbouring eponymous settlement Martin Brod in Bosnia and Herzegovina.

== Literature ==
- Savezni zavod za statistiku i evidenciju FNRJ i SFRJ, popis stanovništva 1948, 1953, 1961, 1971, 1981. i 1991. godine.
- Knjiga: "Narodnosni i vjerski sastav stanovništva Hrvatske, 1880-1991: po naseljima, autor: Jakov Gelo, izdavač: Državni zavod za statistiku Republike Hrvatske, 1998., ISBN 953-6667-07-X, ISBN 978-953-6667-07-9;
