= Brezovac Dobroselski =

Brezovac Dobroselski Брезовац Доброселски (Serbian)
- Village
- Location within Croatia
- Coordinates: 44°26′58″N 16°02′09″E
- Country: Croatia
- County: Lika-Senj
- Municipality: Donji Lapac

Area
  - Total: 9.8 km^{2} (3.8 sq mi)
- Elevation: 845 m (2,772 ft)

Population (2021)
  - Total: 5
  - Density: 0.51/km^{2} (1.3/sq mi)
- Time zone: UTC+1 (CET)
  - Summer (DST): UTC+2 (CEST)
- Postal code: 53252 Doljani
- Area code: +385 (53)

Brezovac Dobroselski (Serbian Cyrillic: Брезовац Доброселски) is a village in Croatia.

== Population ==
According to the 2011 census, Brezovac Dobroselski had 12 inhabitants.

Population
1857	1869	1880	1890	1900	1910	1921	1931	1948	1953	1961	1971	1981	1991	2001	2011
0	0	0	127	131	146	164	155	216	228	350	203	132	101	3	12

Note: It became administrative unit from 1910, till 1931 as part of settlement (hamlet) and from 1948 as independent settlement. Data in 1890 and 1900 is for the former part of settlement (hamlet) of Brezovac Bruvanjski.

=== 1991 census ===
According to the 1991 census, settlement of Brezovac Dobroselski had 101 inhabitants, which were ethnically declared as this:

Brezovac Dobroselski
1991
total: 101
1. Serbs 99 (98.0%)
2. Croats 1 (0.99%)
3. Macedonians 1 (0.99%)

=== Austro-hungarian 1910 census ===
According to the 1910 census, settlement of Brezovac Dobroselski had 146 inhabitants in 2 hamlets, which were linguistically and religiously declared as this:

Population by language	Croatian or Serbian
Bruvanjski Brezovac	139
Dobroselski Brezovac	7
Total	146 (100%)

Population by religion	Eastern Orthodox
Bruvanjski Brezovac	139
Dobroselski Brezovac	7
Total	146 (100%)

== Literature ==
- Savezni zavod za statistiku i evidenciju FNRJ i SFRJ, popis stanovništva 1948, 1953, 1961, 1971, 1981. i 1991. godine.
- Knjiga: "Narodnosni i vjerski sastav stanovništva Hrvatske, 1880-1991: po naseljima, autor: Jakov Gelo, izdavač: Državni zavod za statistiku Republike Hrvatske, 1998., ISBN 953-6667-07-X, ISBN 978-953-6667-07-9;
