= Oraovac, Croatia =

Oraovac Ораовац (Serbian)
- Village
- Location within Croatia
- Coordinates: 44°31′56″N 15°56′05″E
- Country: Croatia
- County: Lika-Senj
- Municipality: Donji Lapac

Area
  - Total: 18.8 km^{2} (7.3 sq mi)
- Elevation: 587 m (1,926 ft)

Population (2021)
  - Total: 124
  - Density: 6.60/km^{2} (17.1/sq mi)
- Time zone: UTC+1 (CET)
  - Summer (DST): UTC+2 (CEST)
- Postal code: 53250 Donji Lapac
- Area code: +385 (53)

Oraovac (Serbian Cyrillic: Ораовац) is a village in Croatia.

== Population ==
According to the 2011 census, Oraovac had 175 inhabitants.

Population
1857	1869	1880	1890	1900	1910	1921	1931	1948	1953	1961	1971	1981	1991	2001	2011
698	793	635	734	691	635	621	592	436	408	410	363	325	303	206	175

=== 1991 census ===
According to the 1991 census, settlement of Oraovac had 303 inhabitants, which were ethnically declared as this:

Oraovac
1991
total: 303
1. Serbs 294 (97.0%)
2. Yugoslavs 6 (1.98%)
3. Muslims 1 (0.33%)
4. Slovenes 1 (0.33%)
5. nondeclared 1 (0.33%)

=== Austro-hungarian 1910 census ===
According to the 1910 census, settlement of Oraovac had 635 inhabitants in 5 hamlets, which were linguistically and religiously declared as this:

Population by language	Croatian or Serbian
Ajduković-brdo	71
Čelina	64
Oraovac	460
Oraovački Kuk	5
Zobeničin Gaj	35
Total	635 (100%)

Population by religion	Eastern Orthodox	Roman Catholics
Ajduković-brdo	71	-
Čelina	64	-
Oraovac	412	48
Oraovački Kuk	5	-
Zobeničin Gaj	35	-
Total	587 (92.44%)	48 (7.55%)

== Literature ==
- Savezni zavod za statistiku i evidenciju FNRJ i SFRJ, popis stanovništva 1948, 1953, 1961, 1971, 1981. i 1991. godine.
- Knjiga: "Narodnosni i vjerski sastav stanovništva Hrvatske, 1880-1991: po naseljima, autor: Jakov Gelo, izdavač: Državni zavod za statistiku Republike Hrvatske, 1998., ISBN 953-6667-07-X, ISBN 978-953-6667-07-9;
