= Bušević =

Bušević Бушевић (Serbian)
- Village
- Location within Croatia
- Coordinates: 44°36′25″N 16°02′03″E
- Country: Croatia
- County: Lika-Senj
- Municipality: Donji Lapac

Area
  - Total: 9.5 km^{2} (3.7 sq mi)
- Elevation: 546 m (1,791 ft)

Population (2021)
  - Total: 4
  - Density: 0.42/km^{2} (1.1/sq mi)
- Time zone: UTC+1 (CET)
  - Summer (DST): UTC+2 (CEST)
- Postal code: 53250 Donji Lapac
- Area code: +385 (53)

Bušević (Serbian Cyrillic: Бушевић) is a village in Croatia.

== Population ==
According to the 2011 census, Bušević had 6 inhabitants.

Population
1857	1869	1880	1890	1900	1910	1921	1931	1948	1953	1961	1971	1981	1991	2001	2011
200	241	225	286	391	499	491	491	332	331	297	255	196	120	2	6

Note: In 1857 and 1869 this settlement was part of Bosnia and Herzegovina (that time Ottoman Empire), without census data, so population number is calculated. 1880, 1890 and 1900 data are taken from Bosnia and Herzegovina censuses (under occupation control of Austria-Hungary) from 1879, 1885 and 1895. There is also non-included data for the settlement which became part of the Yugoslav federal unit of Bosnia and Herzegovina before the 1948 census. The settlement of Bušević became part of the Yugoslav federal unit of Croatia after World War II.

=== 1991 census ===
According to the 1991 census, settlement of Bušević had 120 inhabitants, which were ethnically declared as this:

Bušević
1991
total: 120
1. Serbs 118 (98.3%)
2. Croats 2 (1.66%)

=== Austro-hungarian 1910 census ===
According to the 1910 census, settlement of Bušević had 499 inhabitants, which were linguistically and religiously declared as this:

Population by language	Croatian or Serbian
Bušević	499
Total	499 (100%)

Population by religion	Eastern Orthodox
Bušević	499
Total	499 (100%)

Note: In 1910 census settlement of Bušević was in Bosnia and Herzegovina.

== Literature ==
- Savezni zavod za statistiku i evidenciju FNRJ i SFRJ, popis stanovništva 1948, 1953, 1961, 1971, 1981. i 1991. godine.
- Knjiga: "Narodnosni i vjerski sastav stanovništva Hrvatske, 1880-1991: po naseljima, autor: Jakov Gelo, izdavač: Državni zavod za statistiku Republike Hrvatske, 1998., ISBN 953-6667-07-X, ISBN 978-953-6667-07-9;
