= Kruge, Lika-Senj County =

Kruge Круге (Serbian)
- Village
- Location within Croatia
- Coordinates: 44°38′39″N 15°56′29″E
- Country: Croatia
- County: Lika-Senj
- Municipality: Donji Lapac

Area
  - Total: 19.1 km^{2} (7.4 sq mi)
- Elevation: 669 m (2,195 ft)

Population (2021)
  - Total: 18
  - Density: 0.94/km^{2} (2.4/sq mi)
- Time zone: UTC+1 (CET)
  - Summer (DST): UTC+2 (CEST)
- Postal code: 53251 Nebljusi
- Area code: +385 (53)

Kruge (Serbian Cyrillic: Круге) is a village in Croatia. It is connected by the D218 highway.

== Population ==
According to the 2011 census, Kruge had 54 inhabitants.

Population
1857	1869	1880	1890	1900	1910	1921	1931	1948	1953	1961	1971	1981	1991	2001	2011
419	530	494	373	737	737	625	781	284	333	277	178	139	126	49	54

Note: From 1857-1880 include part of data for the settlements of Gornji Štrbci and Mišljenovac. From 1857-1880 part of data is include in the settlement of Nebljusi.

=== 1991 census ===
According to the 1991 census, settlement of Kruge had 126 inhabitants, which were ethnically declared as this:

Kruge
1991
total: 126
1. Serbs 123 (97.6%)
2. Croats 2 (1.58%)
3. unknown 1 (0.79%)

=== Austro-hungarian 1910 census ===
According to the 1910 census, settlement of Kruge had 737 inhabitants in 3 hamlets, which were linguistically and religiously declared as this:

Population by language	Croatian or Serbian
Kruge	544
Nebljuško Pirovište	147
Srnećak	46
Total	737 (100%)

Population by religion	Eastern Orthodox	Roman Catholics
Kruge	542	2
Nebljuško Pirovište	147	-
Srnećak	46	-
Total	735 (99.72%)	2 (0.27%)

== Literature ==
- Savezni zavod za statistiku i evidenciju FNRJ i SFRJ, popis stanovništva 1948, 1953, 1961, 1971, 1981. i 1991. godine.
- Knjiga: "Narodnosni i vjerski sastav stanovništva Hrvatske, 1880-1991: po naseljima, autor: Jakov Gelo, izdavač: Državni zavod za statistiku Republike Hrvatske, 1998., ISBN 953-6667-07-X, ISBN 978-953-6667-07-9;
