= Mazin, Croatia =

Mazin Мазин (Serbian)
- Village
- Interactive map of Mazin
- Location within Croatia
- Coordinates: 44°27′12″N 15°57′57″E
- Country: Croatia
- County: Zadar County
- Municipality: Gračac

Area
  - Total: 84.5 km^{2} (32.6 sq mi)
- Elevation: 832 m (2,730 ft)

Population (2021)
  - Total: 27
  - Density: 0.32/km^{2} (0.83/sq mi)
- Time zone: UTC+1 (CET)
  - Summer (DST): UTC+2 (CEST)
- Postal code: 23440 Gračac
- Area code: +385 (23)

Mazin (Serbian Cyrillic: Мазин) is a village in Croatia. It is connected by the D218 highway.

== Population ==
According to the 2011 census, Mazin had 47 inhabitants.

Population
1857	1869	1880	1890	1900	1910	1921	1931	1948	1953	1961	1971	1981	1991	2001	2011
1,565	1,981	1,784	1,816	1,895	1,866	1,890	1,687	1,089	1,037	1,067	829	540	362	55	47

=== 1991 census ===
According to the 1991 census, settlement of Mazin had 362 inhabitants, which were ethnically declared as this:

Mazin
1991
total: 362
1. Serbs 356 (98.3%)
2. others 1 (0.27%)
3. unknown 5 (1.38%)

=== Austro-hungarian 1910 census ===
According to the 1910 census, settlement of Mazin had 1,866 inhabitants in 4 hamlets, which were linguistically and religiously declared as this:

Population by language	Croatian or Serbian
Kovačevići Bruvanjski	253
Mandići	332
Mazin	1,019
Tulić	262
Total	1,866 (100%)

Population by religion	Eastern Orthodox	Roman Catholics
Kovačevići Bruvanjski	253	-
Mandići	332	-
Mazin	1,018	1
Tulić	262	-
Total	1,865 (99.94%)	1 (0.05%)

== Literature ==
- Savezni zavod za statistiku i evidenciju FNRJ i SFRJ, popis stanovništva 1948, 1953, 1961, 1971, 1981. i 1991. godine.
- Knjiga: "Narodnosni i vjerski sastav stanovništva Hrvatske, 1880–1991: po naseljima, author: Jakov Gelo, izdavač: Državni zavod za statistiku Republike Hrvatske, 1998., ISBN 953-6667-07-X, ISBN 978-953-6667-07-9;
