= Boričevac =

Boričevac Boričevac (Croatian) Borićevac
- Village
- Location within Croatia
- Coordinates: 44°31′57″N 16°01′34″E
- Country: Croatia
- County: Lika-Senj
- Municipality: Donji Lapac

Area
  - Total: 15.5 km^{2} (6.0 sq mi)
- Elevation: 579 m (1,900 ft)

Population (2021)
  - Total: 13
  - Density: 0.84/km^{2} (2.2/sq mi)
- Time zone: UTC+1 (CET)
  - Summer (DST): UTC+2 (CEST)
- Postal code: 53250 Donji Lapac
- Area code: +385 (53)

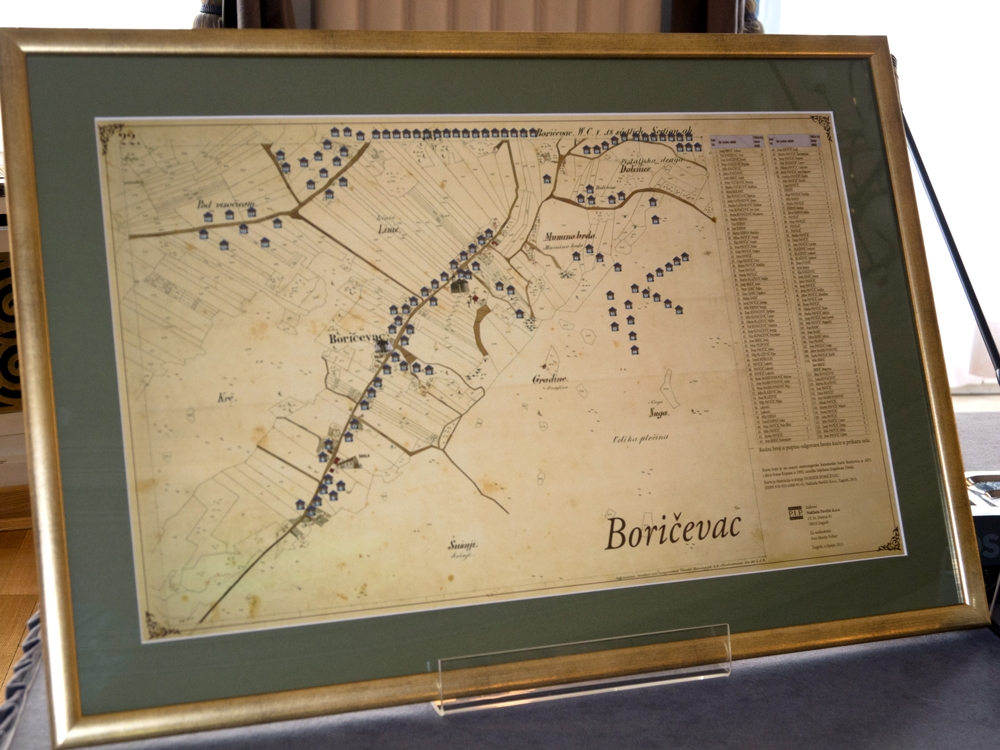
A detailed map of the village

Boričevac is a village in Croatia.

== History ==
Throughout July, August and September 1941, Boričevac was one of several Croat and Muslim villages across Lika and Western Bosnia that were attacked and massacred by Serb Communist insurgents and Chetniks.

== Population ==
According to the 2011 census, Boričevac had 17 inhabitants.

Population
| 1857 | 1869 | 1880 | 1890 | 1900 | 1910 | 1921 | 1931 | 1948 | 1953 | 1961 | 1971 | 1981 | 1991 | 2001 | 2011 |
| 708 | 879 | 702 | 787 | 800 | 788 | 763 | 788 | 11 | 42 | 41 | 41 | 83 | 33 | 24 | 17 |

Note: Till 1931 it was independent settlement and from 1948-1991 part of settlement (hamlet). From 1857-1880 include data for settlement of Mišljenovac. It became independent settlement again in 2001 from the settlement of Gajine.

=== 1991 census ===
For the ethnic composition of population in 1991 census see: Gajine.

=== Austro-hungarian 1910 census ===
According to the 1910 census, settlement of Boričevac had 788 inhabitants in 4 hamlets, which were linguistically and religiously declared as this:

| Population by language | Croatian or Serbian |
|---|---|
| Boričevac | 450 |
| Boričevački Bubanj | 171 |
| Jasenovača | 82 |
| Lisičjak | 85 |
| Total | 788 (100%) |

| Population by religion | Roman Catholics | Eastern Orthodox |
|---|---|---|
| Boričevac | 438 | 12 |
| Boričevački Bubanj | 155 | 16 |
| Jasenovača | 82 | - |
| Lisičjak | 85 | - |
| Total | 760 (96.44%) | 28 (3.55%) |

== See also ==
- Boričevac massacre

== Literature ==
- Savezni zavod za statistiku i evidenciju FNRJ i SFRJ, popis stanovništva 1948, 1953, 1961, 1971, 1981. i 1991. godine.
- Knjiga: "Narodnosni i vjerski sastav stanovništva Hrvatske, 1880-1991: po naseljima, author: Jakov Gelo, izdavač: Državni zavod za statistiku Republike Hrvatske, 1998., ISBN 953-6667-07-X, ISBN 978-953-6667-07-9;
