= Milan Beara =

Politician in Serbia

Milan Beara (Serbian Cyrillic: Милан Беара; born 1980) is a politician in Serbia. He has served in the Assembly of Vojvodina since 2020 as a member of the Serbian Progressive Party.

== Private career ==
Beara lives in Stara Pazova. He is an entrepreneur.

== Politician ==
=== Municipal politics ===
Beara received the thirty-first position on the Progressive Party's electoral list for the Stara Pazova municipal assembly in the 2016 Serbian local elections and narrowly missed direct election when the list won twenty-nine mandates. He may have briefly served in the assembly at the start of the term as the replacement for another member. Beara was appointed as the municipality's deputy mayor on 18 May 2016 and served in this role for the next four years.

He was given the sixth position on the Progressive Party's list for Stara Pazova in the 2020 local elections and was elected when the list won a majority with thirty-seven of fifty-three mandates. He resigned his mandate on 21 August 2020.

=== Provincial politics ===
Beara sought election to the Vojvodina provincial assembly in the 2012 provincial election, running in the Stara Pazova constituency seat. He was narrowly defeated in the second round of voting.

Vojvodina subsequently switched to a system of complete proportional representation. Beara was given the nineteenth position on the Progressive Party's list in the 2020 provincial election and was elected when the list won a majority victory with seventy-six out of 120 seats. He is now the deputy president of the assembly committee on the economy and a member of the committee on organization of administration and local self-government.

== Electoral record ==
=== Provincial (Vojvodina) ===
2012 Vojvodina provincial election: Stara Pazova
Candidate	Party	First round		Second round	
Candidate	Party	Votes	%	Votes	%
Dušan Inđić (incumbent)	"Choice for a Better Vojvodina–Bojan Pajtic" (Affiliation: Democratic Party)	5,806	19.78	12,365	50.43
Milan Beara	Coalition: Let's Get Vojvodina Moving–Tomislav Nikolić (Serbian Progressive Party, New Serbia, Movement of Socialists, Strength of Serbia Movement) (Affiliation: Serbian Progressive Party)	7,646	26.05	12,154	49.57
Ljubomir Milanović	Coalition: Socialist Party of Serbia (SPS), Party of United Pensioners of Serbia (PUPS), United Serbia (JS), Social Democratic Party of Serbia (SDP Serbia)	3,783	12.89		
Miloš Crnomarković	Democratic Party of Serbia	3,568	12.16		
Srđo Komazec	Serbian Radical Party	3,146	10.72		
Nineta Vajđik	League of Social Democrats of Vojvodina–Nenad Čanak	1,965	6.70		
Nenad Radaković	Citizens' Group: Dveri Serbian Vojvodina	1,851	6.31		
Miloš Pavlović	Coalition: United Regions of Serbia–Mijodrag Mojić	1,583	5.39		
Total		29,348	100.00	24,519	100.00
