= Gornji Štrbci =

Gornji Štrbci Горњи Штрбци (Serbian)
- Village
- Location within Croatia
- Coordinates: 44°37′43″N 15°58′56″E
- Country: Croatia
- County: Lika-Senj
- Municipality: Donji Lapac

Area
  - Total: 11.4 km^{2} (4.4 sq mi)
- Elevation: 585 m (1,919 ft)

Population (2021)
  - Total: 0
  - Density: 0.0/km^{2} (0.0/sq mi)
- Time zone: UTC+1 (CET)
  - Summer (DST): UTC+2 (CEST)
- Postal code: 53251 Nebljusi
- Area code: +385 (53)

Gornji Štrbci (Serbian Cyrillic: Горњи Штрбци) is a village in Croatia.

== Population ==
According to the 2011 census, Gornji Štrbci had 18 inhabitants.

Population
1857	1869	1880	1890	1900	1910	1921	1931	1948	1953	1961	1971	1981	1991	2001	2011
0	0	0	135	179	215	250	218	268	232	169	123	52	59	4	18

Note: Till 1931 name of the settlement was Štrbci, in 1948 Lički Štrbci and from 1953 it is now named Gornji Štrbci. From 1857-1880 data is include in the settlements of Kruge and Nebljusi, and in 1890 part of data is include in the settlement of Nebljusi.

=== 1991 census ===
According to the 1991 census, settlement of Gornji Štrbci had 59 inhabitants, which were ethnically declared as this:

Gornji Štrbci
1991
total: 59
1. Serbs 59 (100.0%)

=== Austro-hungarian 1910 census ===
According to the 1910 census, settlement of Gornji Štrbci had 215 inhabitants in 3 hamlets, which were linguistically and religiously declared as this:

Population by language	Croatian or Serbian
Balaćeva Lisina	30
Milića Kraj	45
Štrbci	140
Total	215 (100%)

Population by religion	Eastern Orthodox
Balaćeva Lisina	30
Milića Kraj	45
Štrbci	140
Total	215 (100%)

== Literature ==
- Savezni zavod za statistiku i evidenciju FNRJ i SFRJ, popis stanovništva 1948, 1953, 1961, 1971, 1981. i 1991. godine.
- Knjiga: "Narodnosni i vjerski sastav stanovništva Hrvatske, 1880-1991: po naseljima, autor: Jakov Gelo, izdavač: Državni zavod za statistiku Republike Hrvatske, 1998., ISBN 953-6667-07-X, ISBN 978-953-6667-07-9;
