= Nebljusi =

Nebljusi Небљуси (Serbian)
- Village
- Interactive map of Nebljusi
- Location within Croatia
- Coordinates: 44°39′39″N 15°56′40″E
- Country: Croatia
- County: Lika-Senj
- Municipality: Donji Lapac

Area
  - Total: 45.4 km^{2} (17.5 sq mi)
- Elevation: 541 m (1,775 ft)

Population (2021)
  - Total: 111
  - Density: 2.44/km^{2} (6.33/sq mi)
- Time zone: UTC+1 (CET)
  - Summer (DST): UTC+2 (CEST)
- Postal code: 53251 Nebljusi
- Area code: +385 (53)

Nebljusi (Serbian Cyrillic: Небљуси) is a village in Croatia. It is connected by the D218 highway.

== Population ==
According to the 2011 census, Nebljusi had 208 inhabitants.

Population
1857	1869	1880	1890	1900	1910	1921	1931	1948	1953	1961	1971	1981	1991	2001	2011
849	1.184	1.246	1.214	1.165	1.165	1.010	1.720	609	628	625	467	349	303	166	208

Note: From 1857-1880 include data for the settlement of Gornji Štrbci, in 1890 part of data for that settlement, and from 1857-1880 part of data for the settlement of Kruge. In 1931 include data for the settlements of Donji Štrbci and Kestenovac. It also include data for the formerly independent settlement of Seoce.

=== 1991 census ===
According to the 1991 census, settlement of Nebljusi had 303 inhabitants, which were ethnically declared as this:

Nebljusi
1991
total: 303
1. Serbs 287 (94.7%)
2. Yugoslavs 3 (0.99%)
3. Croats 2 (0.66%)
4. Greeks 2 (0.66%)
5. Muslims 1 (0.33%)
6. Roma 1 (0.33%)
7. unknown 7 (2.31%)

=== Austro-hungarian 1910 census ===
According to the 1910 census, settlement of Nebljusi had 1,165 inhabitants in 4 hamlets, which were linguistically and religiously declared as this:

Population by language	Croatian or Serbian
Capaćuša	108
Nebljusi	865
Seoce	131
Užljebić	61
Total	1,165 (100%)

Population by religion	Eastern Orthodox	Roman Catholics
Capaćuša	108	-
Nebljusi	850	15
Seoce	131	-
Užljebić	61	-
Total	1,150 (98.71%)	15 (1.28%)

Note: In 1910 census hamlet of Seoce was in Bosnia and Herzegovina.

== Literature ==
- Savezni zavod za statistiku i evidenciju FNRJ i SFRJ, popis stanovništva 1948, 1953, 1961, 1971, 1981. i 1991. godine.
- Knjiga: "Narodnosni i vjerski sastav stanovništva Hrvatske, 1880-1991: po naseljima, autor: Jakov Gelo, izdavač: Državni zavod za statistiku Republike Hrvatske, 1998., ISBN 953-6667-07-X, ISBN 978-953-6667-07-9;
