= Gajine, Croatia =

Gajine Гајине (Serbian)
- Village
- Location within Croatia
- Coordinates: 44°32′39″N 15°59′01″E
- Country: Croatia
- County: Lika-Senj
- Municipality: Donji Lapac

Area
  - Total: 9.8 km^{2} (3.8 sq mi)
- Elevation: 629 m (2,064 ft)

Population (2021)
  - Total: 67
  - Density: 6.8/km^{2} (18/sq mi)
- Time zone: UTC+1 (CET)
  - Summer (DST): UTC+2 (CEST)
- Postal code: 53250 Donji Lapac
- Area code: +385 (53)

Gajine (Serbian Cyrillic: Гајине) is a village in Croatia.

== Population ==
According to the 2011 census, Gajine had 116 inhabitants.

Population
1857	1869	1880	1890	1900	1910	1921	1931	1948	1953	1961	1971	1981	1991	2001	2011
0	0	0	643	783	772	786	991	378	378	365	353	169	224	71	116

Note: From 1857- 1880 data is included in the settlement of Donji Lapac. In 2001 part of the settlement (hamlet), by name Boričevac, became an independent settlement.

=== 1991 census ===
According to the 1991 census, the settlement of Gajine had 257 inhabitants, who were ethnically described as follows:

Gajine
1991
total: 257
1. Serbs 245 (95.3%)
2. Yugoslavs 5 (1.94%)
3. Croats 2 (0.77%)
4. unknown 5 (1.94%)

Note: Together with settlement of Boričevac.

=== Austro-Hungarian 1910 census ===
According to the 1910 census, the settlement of Gajine had 772 inhabitants in 6 hamlets, who were linguistically and religiously described as follows:

Population by language	Croatian or Serbian
Gajine	260
Kosić-draga	41
Lapački Obljaj	111
Malta	76
Podlisac	173
Varošine	111
Total	772 (100%)

Population by religion	Eastern Orthodox	Roman Catholics
Gajine	260	-
Kosić-draga	41	-
Lapački Obljaj	111	-
Malta	68	8
Podlisac	43	130
Varošine	99	12
Total	622 (80.56%)	150 (19.43%)

== Literature ==
- Savezni zavod za statistiku i evidenciju FNRJ i SFRJ, popis stanovništva 1948, 1953, 1961, 1971, 1981. i 1991. godine.
- Knjiga: "Narodnosni i vjerski sastav stanovništva Hrvatske, 1880-1991: po naseljima, autor: Jakov Gelo, izdavač: Državni zavod za statistiku Republike Hrvatske, 1998., ISBN 953-6667-07-X, ISBN 978-953-6667-07-9;
