= Jovan Tišma =

Serbian politician (born 1969)

Jovan Tišma (Serbian Cyrillic: Јован Тишма; born 22 January 1969) is a Serbian politician. He has served in the National Assembly of Serbia and the Assembly of Vojvodina and was the mayor of Stara Pazova from 2000 to 2004. For most of his time as an elected official, Tišma was a member of the Democratic Party (DS).

== Private career ==
Tišma is an electrical technician from the community of Nova Pazova in Stara Pazova.

== Politician ==
=== Mayor of Stara Pazova (2000–04) ===
In 2000, the Democratic Party became part of the Democratic Opposition of Serbia (DOS), a multi-party coalition opposed to the continued rule of Slobodan Milošević and his allies. DOS candidate Vojislav Koštunica defeated Milošević in the 2000 Yugoslavian presidential election, a watershed moment in Serbian politics.

The DOS also won several historic victories in the concurrent 2000 Serbian local elections; in Stara Pazova, the alliance won a majority victory with thirty-six out of forty-eight seats. Tišma was elected to the local assembly as a DOS candidate and was afterward chosen as assembly president, a position that was at the time equivalent to mayor. He remained in the role for the next four years. Near the end of his term in September 2004, he said that his government had needed to focus on rebuilding a communal infrastructure to set the stage for growth in other fields.

Serbia introduced the direct election of mayors in the 2004 local elections. Tišma ran for re-election of Stara Pazova and was defeated in the second round by Srđo Komazec of the far-right Serbian Radical Party (SRS).

=== Parliamentarian (2007–08) ===
Tišma received the 136th position out of 250 on the Democratic Party's electoral list in the 2003 Serbian parliamentary election. The list won thirty-seven seats, and he was not included afterward in his party's assembly delegation. (From 2000 to 2011, mandates in Serbian parliamentary elections were awarded to successful parties or coalitions rather than individual candidates, and it was common practice for the mandates to be assigned out of numerical order. Tišma could have been given a mandate despite his low position on the list, but this did not occur.)

Tišma was later given the 229th position on the DS's mostly alphabetical list in the 2007 parliamentary election. The list won sixty-four seats, and on this occasion he received a mandate. The DS formed an unstable coalition government with the Democratic Party of Serbia (DSS) and G17 Plus after the election, and Tišma supported the administration in the assembly. He was a member of the committee for economic reforms and the committee for local self-government.

In October 2007, then-SRS parliamentarian Aleksandar Vučić was reprimanded for calling Tišma a "drug dealer" in an assembly debate. This occurred after Tišma accused Srđo Komazec of selling eighteen hectares of land in an illegal auction.

The DS–DSS coalition broke down in early 2008, and a new parliamentary election was held in May of that year; the DS contested the election as the dominant party in the For a European Serbia (ZES) alliance. Tišma received the 219th position on the alliance's list, which was again mostly alphabetical, and was not given a new mandate even as the list won a plurality victory with 102 seats.

=== Local official and provincial representative (2008–16) ===
The direct election of mayors proved to be a short-lived experiment and was discarded after a single term. Since 2008, Serbian mayors have been chosen by the elected delegates of local assemblies.

The Radical Party narrowly defeated the DS in Stara Pazova in the 2008 local elections, but the DS was able to form a coalition government with Goran Jović as mayor. Tišma was appointed as director of the municipality's construction directorate and remained in the role for the next four years.

In March 2011, Tišma took part in a ceremony commemorating the eighth anniversary of the death of former Serbian prime minister Zoran Đinđić. He endorsed Đinđić's vision of Serbia in the European Union and was quoted as saying, "After his death, everything stopped. When the worst time came, we started to build the country. We lost 5-6 years and now it is difficult to make up for it."

Serbia's electoral laws were reformed in 2011, such that mandates were awarded to candidates on successful lists in numerical order. Tišma appeared in the thirteenth position on the DS's list in the 2012 Vojvodina provincial election, which was held under a system of mixed proportional representation, and was elected when the party won sixteen proportional seats. The DS won the election overall and formed a coalition government, and Tišma supported the administration in the assembly. He served on the committee for the organization of administration and local self-government and the committee for urban planning, spatial planning, and environmental protection.

Tišma was arrested in 2013 on charges of corruption relating to his time as director of Stara Pazova's construction directorate. The Democratic Party condemned the manner of arrest as a political stunt, noting that he had been declared arrested on local television rather than taken into custody. In December 2014, Tišma accused members of the Serbian Progressive Party (SNS) and Third Serbia (TS) of promising the indictment would be withdrawn if he left the DS assembly group to join Third Serbia. Representatives of these parties denied the accusation. Online reports do not seem to indicate how the charges against Tišma were resolved; there is no indication that he was found guilty, and his political career did not come to an end.

He was given the ninety-sixth position on the DS's list in the 2014 parliamentary election and was not elected when list won only nineteen seats.

=== Since 2016 ===
Vojvodina switched to a system of full proportional representation for the 2016 provincial election. Tišma received the sixty-sixth position on the DS list and was not re-elected when the party's alliance fell to ten seats. In the concurrent 2016 local elections, however, he received the second position on the DS list in Stara Pazova and was returned to the local parliament after an absence of several years when the list won three seats. The SNS won the election, and he served in opposition.

Tišma left the DS and joined the small Republican Party in 2018. In the 2020 Serbian local elections, he ran in Stara Pazova at the head of an independent list called Šakom o Sto ("Fist on the Table"). The list did not cross the electoral threshold for assembly representation.

== Electoral record ==
=== Local (Stara Pazova) ===
2004 Municipality of Stara Pazova local election: Mayor of Stara Pazova
Candidate	Party	First round		Second round	
Candidate	Party	Votes	%	Votes	%
Srđo Komazec	Serbian Radical Party			8,566	56.54
Jovan Tišma (incumbent)	Democratic Party			6,583	43.46
other candidates					
Total				15,149	100.00
