= Dnopolje =

Dnopolje Днопоље (Serbian)
- Village
- Location within Croatia
- Coordinates: 44°34′32″N 15°55′22″E
- Country: Croatia
- County: Lika-Senj
- Municipality: Donji Lapac

Area
  - Total: 38.1 km^{2} (14.7 sq mi)
- Elevation: 679 m (2,228 ft)

Population (2021)
  - Total: 63
  - Density: 1.7/km^{2} (4.3/sq mi)
- Time zone: UTC+1 (CET)
  - Summer (DST): UTC+2 (CEST)
- Postal code: 53250 Donji Lapac
- Area code: +385 (53)

Dnopolje (Serbian Cyrillic: Днопоље) is a village in Croatia. It is connected by the D218 highway.

== Population ==
According to the 2011 census, Dnopolje had 112 inhabitants.

Population
1857	1869	1880	1890	1900	1910	1921	1931	1948	1953	1961	1971	1981	1991	2001	2011
892	1.050	1.013	789	783	809	826	665	482	436	385	377	285	249	158	112

Note: From 1857-1880 include data for the settlement of Birovača, and also part of data for the settlement of Mišljenovac.

=== 1991 census ===
According to the 1991 census, settlement of Dnopolje had 249 inhabitants, which were ethnically declared as this:

Dnopolje
1991
total: 249
1. Serbs 241 (96.8%)
2. Croats 2 (0.80%)
3. Yugoslavs 1 (0.40%)
4. nondeclared 5 (2.00%)

=== Austro-hungarian 1910 census ===
According to the 1910 census, settlement of Dnopolje had 809 inhabitants in 2 hamlets, which were linguistically and religiously declared as this:

Population by language	Croatian or Serbian	German
Dnopolje	777	1
Plješivička Kalinovača	31	-
Total	808 (99.87%)	1 (0.12%)

Population by religion	Eastern Orthodox	Roman Catholics
Dnopolje	777	1
Plješivička Kalinovača	31	-
Total	808 (99.87%)	1 (0.12%)

== Literature ==
- Savezni zavod za statistiku i evidenciju FNRJ i SFRJ, popis stanovništva 1948, 1953, 1961, 1971, 1981. i 1991. godine.
- Knjiga: "Narodnosni i vjerski sastav stanovništva Hrvatske, 1880-1991: po naseljima, autor: Jakov Gelo, izdavač: Državni zavod za statistiku Republike Hrvatske, 1998., ISBN 953-6667-07-X, ISBN 978-953-6667-07-9;
