= Birovača =

Birovača Бировача (Serbian)
- Village
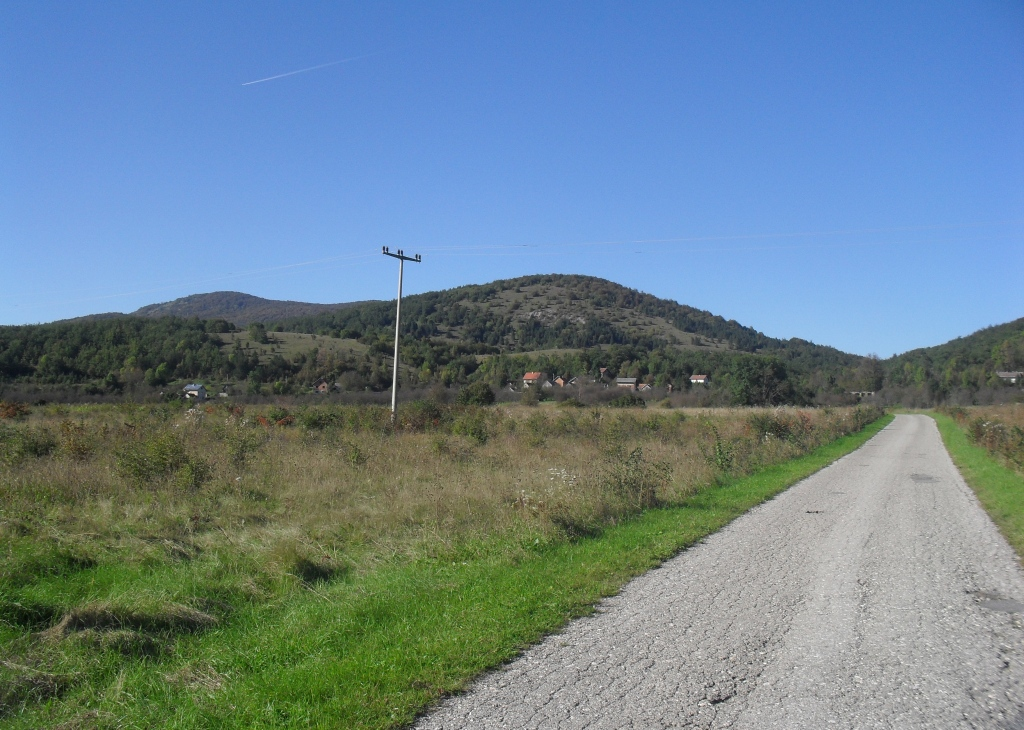
- Birovača

- Location within Croatia
- Coordinates: 44°35′23″N 15°57′42″E
- Country: Croatia
- County: Lika-Senj
- Municipality: Donji Lapac

Area
  - Total: 24.4 km^{2} (9.4 sq mi)
- Elevation: 777 m (2,549 ft)

Population (2021)
  - Total: 67
  - Density: 2.7/km^{2} (7.1/sq mi)
- Time zone: UTC+1 (CET)
  - Summer (DST): UTC+2 (CEST)
- Postal code: 53250 Donji Lapac
- Area code: +385 (53)

Birovača (Serbian Cyrillic: Бировача) is a village in Croatia. It is connected by the D218 highway.

During the Croatian War of Independence, Birovača was in the Republic of Serbian Krajina.

== Population ==
According to the 2011 census, Birovača had 77 inhabitants.

Population
1857	1869	1880	1890	1900	1910	1921	1931	1948	1953	1961	1971	1981	1991	2001	2011
0	0	0	335	446	403	371	425	331	325	306	292	238	247	103	77

Note: From 1857-1880 data is include in settlement of Dnopolje. Till 1931 it was part of settlement (hamlet).

=== 1991 census ===
According to the 1991 census, settlement of Birovača had 247 inhabitants, which were ethnically declared as this:

Birovača
1991
total: 247
1. Serbs 239 (96.8%)
2. Macedonians 6 (2.42%)
3. nondeclared 1 (0.40%)
4. regionally declared 1 (0.40%)

=== Austro-Hungarian 1910 census ===
According to the 1910 census, settlement of Birovača had 403 inhabitants in 4 hamlets, which were linguistically and religiously declared as this:

Population by language	Croatian or Serbian
Birovača	192
Dnopoljski Trnovac	52
Lapačka Korita	51
Opačića Dolina	108
Total	403 (100%)

Population by religion	Eastern Orthodox	Roman Catholics
Birovača	191	1
Dnopoljski Trnovac	52	-
Lapačka Korita	51	-
Opačića Dolina	108	-
Total	402 (99.75%)	1 (0.24%)

== Literature ==
- Savezni zavod za statistiku i evidenciju FNRJ i SFRJ, popis stanovništva 1948, 1953, 1961, 1971, 1981. i 1991. godine.
- Knjiga: "Narodnosni i vjerski sastav stanovništva Hrvatske, 1880-1991: po naseljima, author: Jakov Gelo, izdavač: Državni zavod za statistiku Republike Hrvatske, 1998., ISBN 953-6667-07-X, ISBN 978-953-6667-07-9;
