= D218 road =

Road in Croatia

D218 state road

Route information
- Part of
- Length: 52.02 km (32.32 mi)

Major junctions
- From: Užljebić border crossing to Bosnia and Herzegovina
- To: D1 in Bjelopolje

Location
- Country: Croatia
- Counties: Lika-Senj

Highway system
- Highways in Croatia

D218 is a state road in Lika region of Croatia connecting Užljebić border crossing to Croatian highway network. The road is 52.02 km (32.32 mi) long.

Until 2020, the southern part of the road went between Donji Lapac and Bruvno, when it was redesignated to go between Donji Lapac and Bjelopolje.

The road, as well as all other state roads in Croatia, is managed and maintained by Hrvatske ceste, a state-owned company.

== Traffic volume ==
Traffic is regularly counted and reported by Hrvatske ceste (HC), operator of the road.

D218 traffic volume
Road	Counting site	AADT	ASDT	Notes
D218	4305 Donji Lapac	422	566	Between the Ž5167 and Ž5168 junctions.
D218	4923 Mazin - south	172	318	Adjacent to the D1 junction.

== Road junctions and populated areas ==
D218 junctions/populated areas
Type	Slip roads/Notes
	Užljebić border crossing. The road extends to Bihać, Bosnia and Herzegovina. The western terminus of the road.
	Nebljusi
	Kruge
	Birovača
	Donji Lapac; Ž5217 to Bruvno (D1). Ž5167 to Udbina (D1).
	Dnopolje
	Frkašić
	Bjelopolje; D1 to Udbina and Knin (to the south) and to Korenica and Karlovac (to the north). The eastern terminus of the road.
