= Kestenovac, Lika-Senj County =

Kestenovac Кестеновац (Serbian)
- Village
- Interactive map of Kestenovac
- Location within Croatia
- Coordinates: 44°37′59″N 16°01′08″E
- Country: Croatia
- County: Lika-Senj
- Municipality: Donji Lapac

Area
  - Total: 14.4 km^{2} (5.6 sq mi)
- Elevation: 546 m (1,791 ft)

Population (2021)
  - Total: 20
  - Density: 1.4/km^{2} (3.6/sq mi)
- Time zone: UTC+1 (CET)
  - Summer (DST): UTC+2 (CEST)
- Postal code: 53251 Nebljusi
- Area code: +385 (53)

Kestenovac (Serbian Cyrillic: Кестеновац) is a village in Croatia. It has a population of 39 (2011 census). It has an area of 3.3 km^{2} and around 70 buildings.

In the village there was an elementary school which was destroyed in the 1991-1995 war.

Kestenovac is located near Ljutoč and Plješevica mountains, and is also near the River Una and Štrbački Buk waterfalls. It belongs to the Donji Lapac municipality.

== Population ==
According to the 2011 census, Kestenovac had 39 inhabitants.

Kestenovac: Population trends 1857–2021
v

population	189	227	212	287	381	446	433		338	370	333	282	210	159	30	39	20
	1857	1869	1880	1890	1900	1910	1921	1931	1948	1953	1961	1971	1981	1991	2001	2011	2021

Note:In 1857 and 1869 this settlement was part of Bosnia and Herzegovina (that time Ottoman Empire), without census data, so population number is calculated. 1880, 1890 and 1900 data are taken from Bosnia and Herzegovina censuses (under occupation control of Austria-Hungary) from 1879, 1885 and 1895. There is also non-included data for the settlement which became part of the Yugoslav federal unit of Bosnia and Herzegovina before the 1948 census. In 1931 data is included in the settlement of Nebljusi. The settlement of Kestenovac became part of the Yugoslav federal unit of Croatia after World War II. Sources: Croatian Bureau of Statistics publications

=== 1991 census ===
According to the 1991 census, settlement of Kestenovac had 159 inhabitants, which were ethnically declared as:

Kestenovac
1991
total: 159
1. Serbs 147 (92.5%)
2. Muslims 8 (5.03%)
3. Yugoslavs 4 (2.51%)

=== Austro-hungarian 1910 census ===
According to the 1910 census, settlement of Kestenovac had 446 inhabitants, which were linguistically and religiously declared as this:

Population by language	Croatian or Serbian
Kestenovac	446
Total	446 (100%)

Population by religion	Eastern Orthodox	Roman Catholics
Kestenovac	437	9
Total	437 (97.98%)	9 (2.01%)

Note: In 1910 census settlement of Kestenovac was in Bosnia and Herzegovina.

== Literature ==
- Savezni zavod za statistiku i evidenciju FNRJ i SFRJ, popis stanovništva 1948, 1953, 1961, 1971, 1981. i 1991. godine.
- Knjiga: "Narodnosni i vjerski sastav stanovništva Hrvatske, 1880-1991: po naseljima, autor: Jakov Gelo, izdavač: Državni zavod za statistiku Republike Hrvatske, 1998., ISBN 953-6667-07-X, ISBN 978-953-6667-07-9;
