= Donji Lapac =

Donji Lapac Доњи Лапац (Serbian)
- Municipality
- Donji Lapac Municipality; Općina Donji Lapac
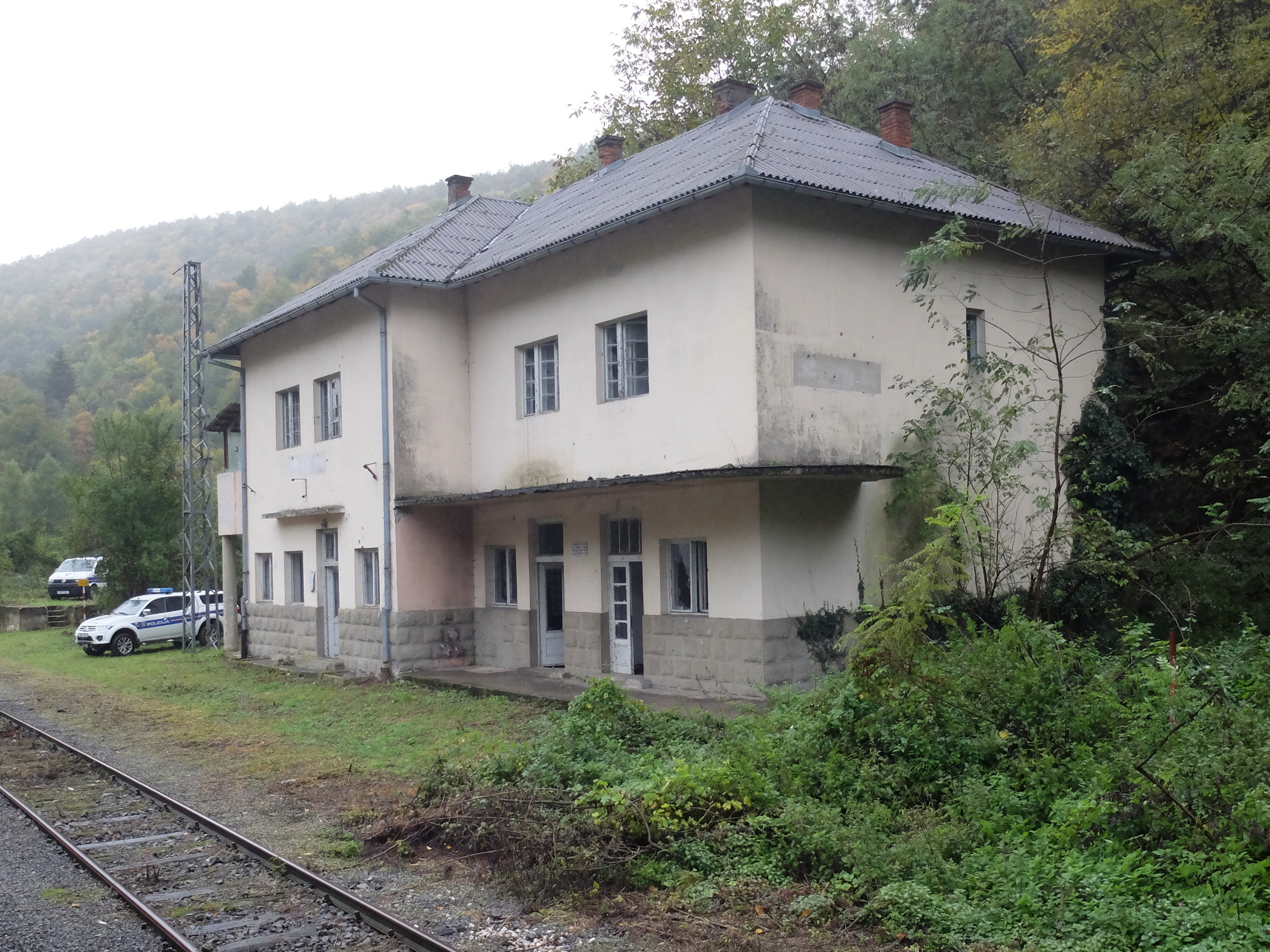
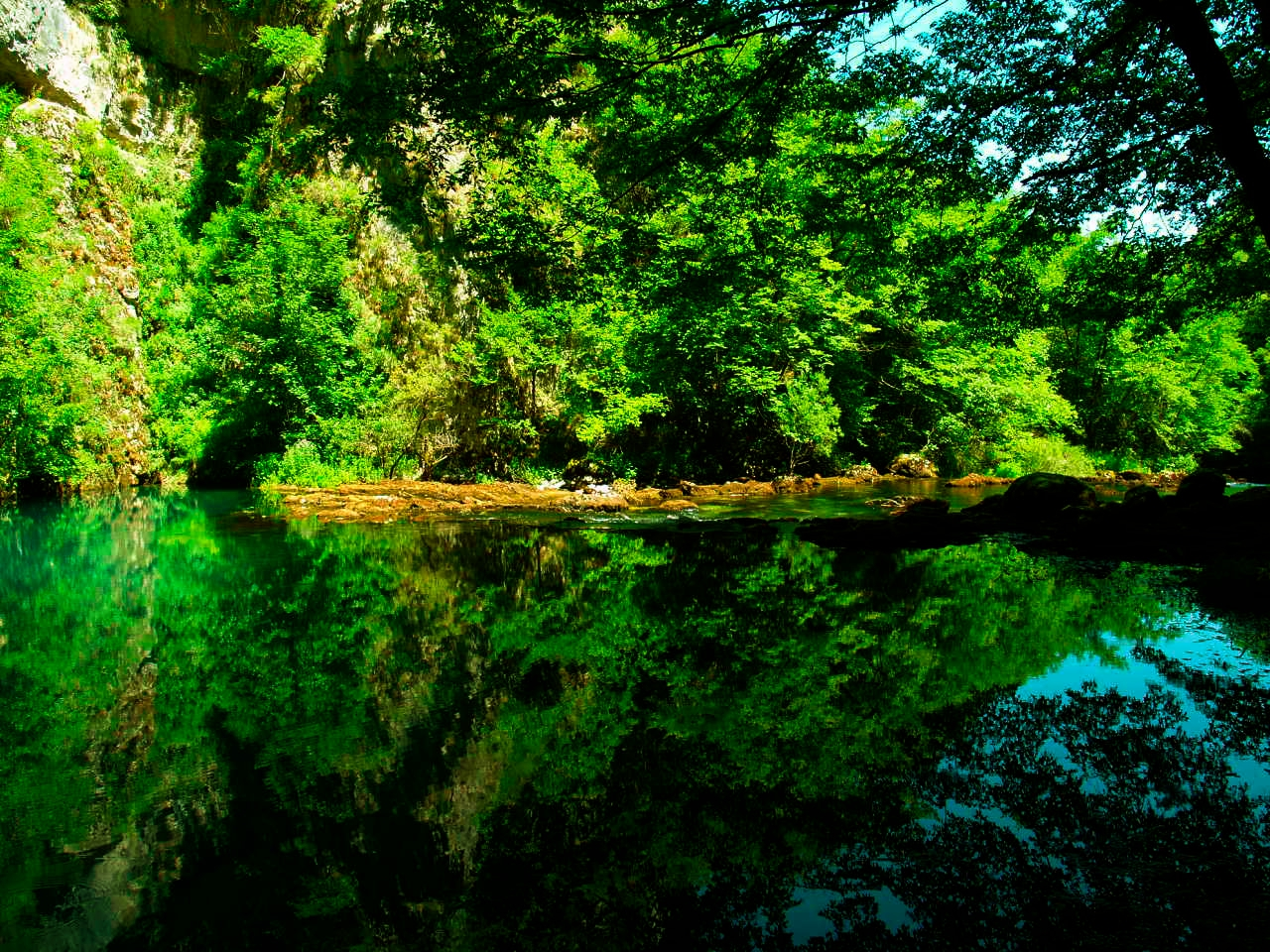
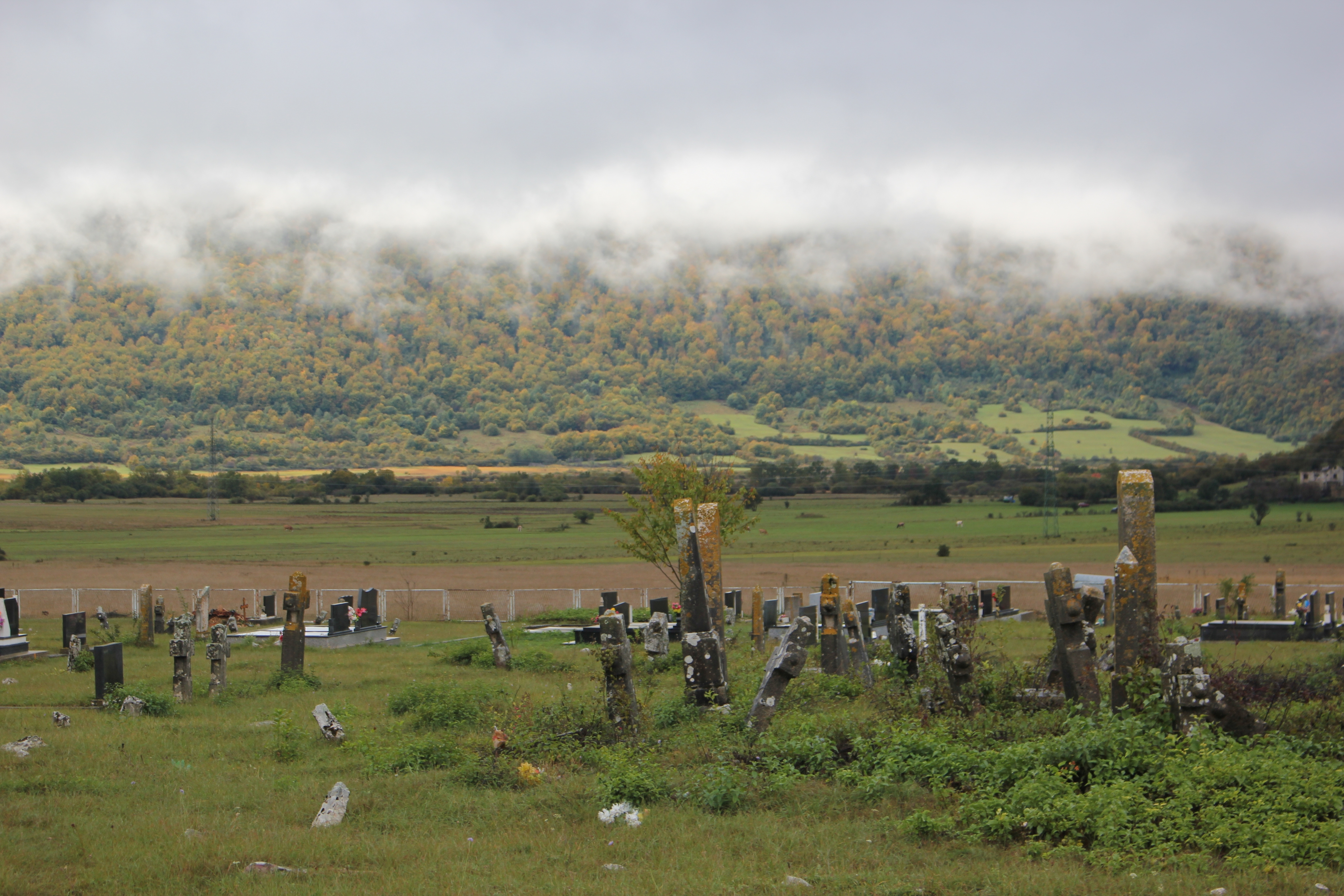
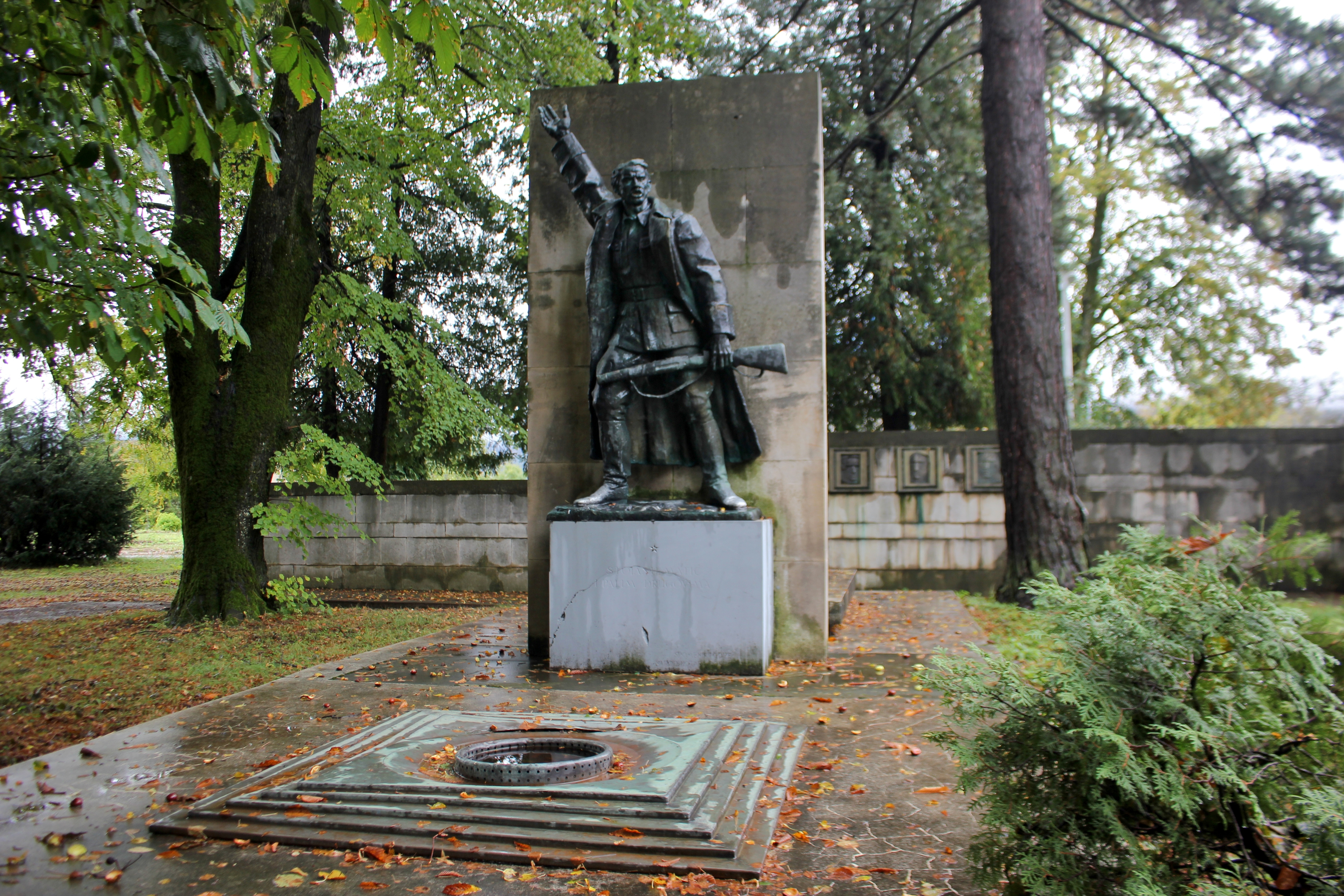
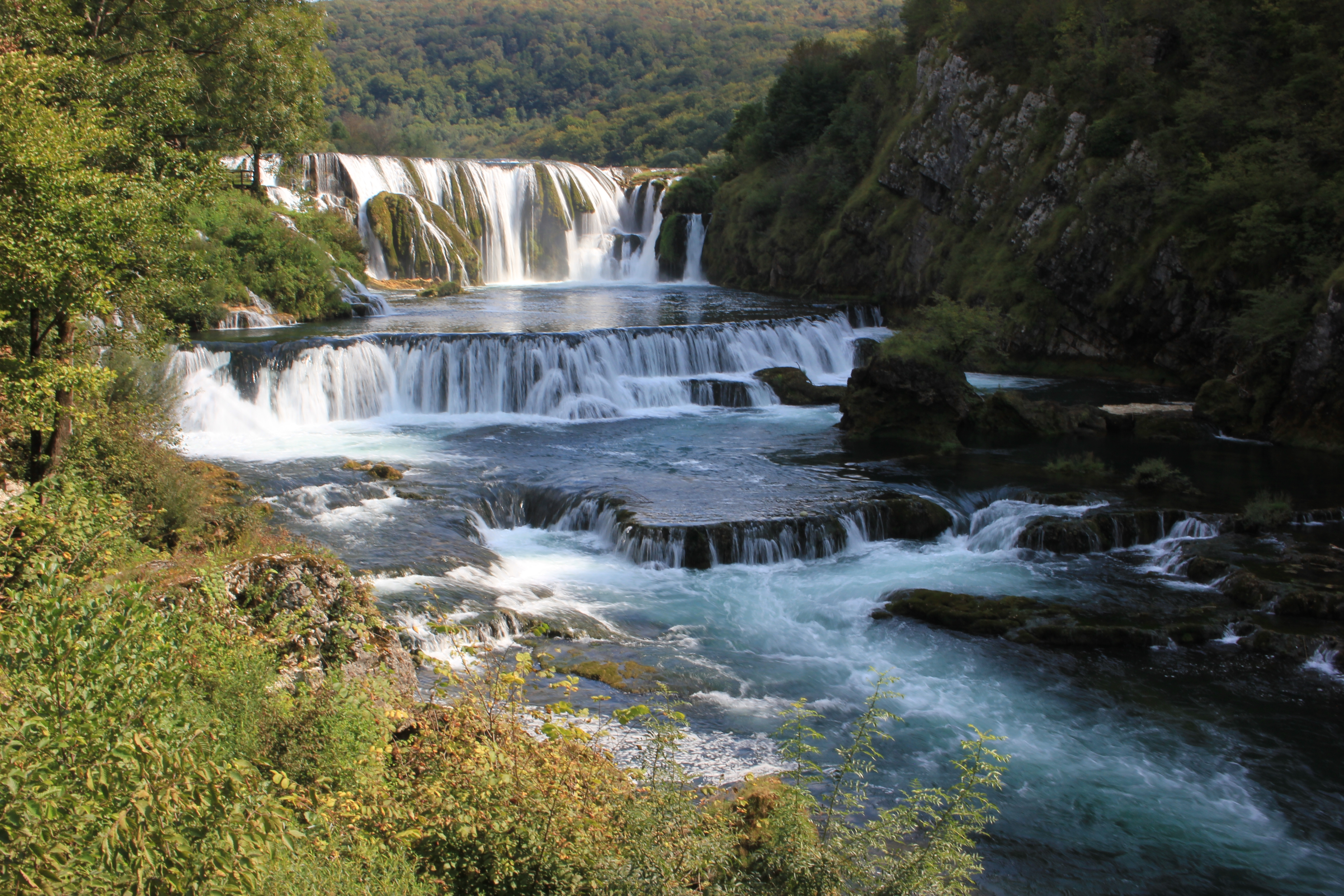
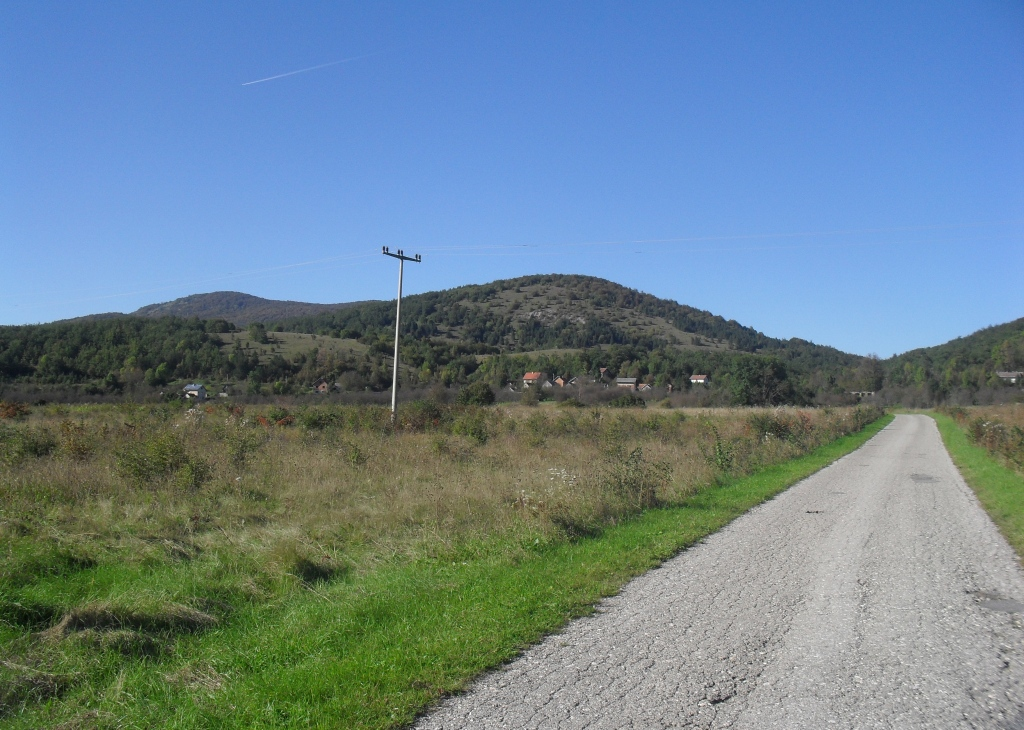
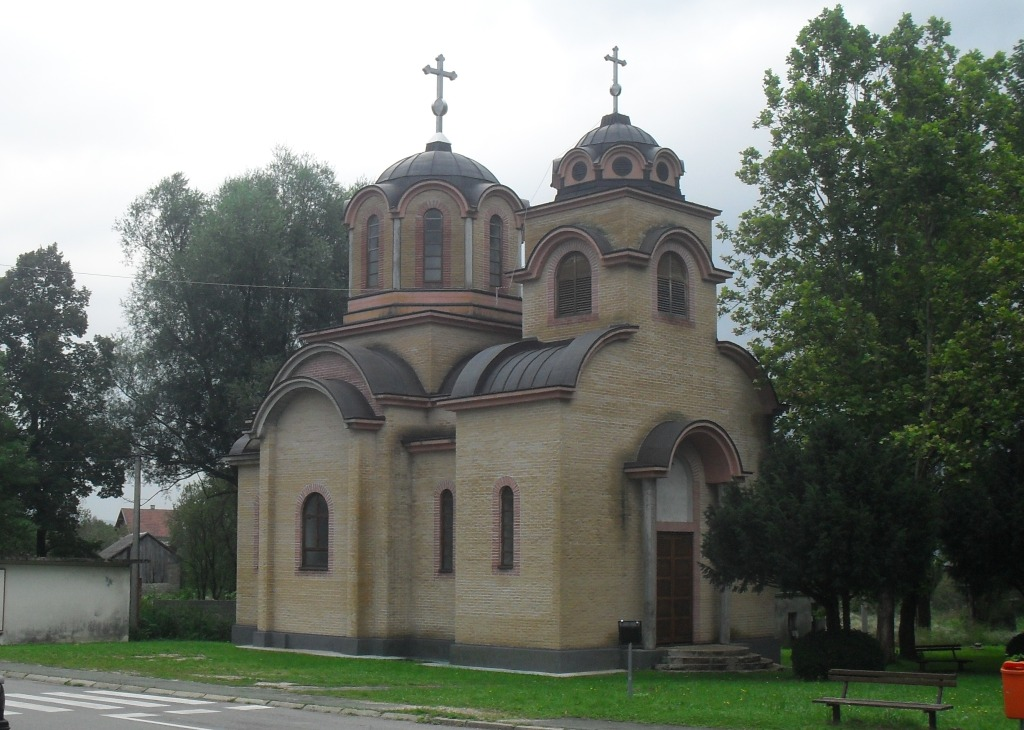
- Donji Lapac Municipality

- Coat of arms
- Interactive map of Donji Lapac
- Location within Croatia
- Coordinates: 44°33′16″N 15°57′33″E
- Country: Croatia
- County: Lika-Senj County

Government
  - Mayor: Milan Knežević (SDSS)

Area
  - Municipality: 350.7 km^{2} (135.4 sq mi)
  - Urban: 11.3 km^{2} (4.4 sq mi)

Population (2022)
  - Municipality: 1,310
  - Density: 3.74/km^{2} (9.67/sq mi)
  - Urban: 677
  - Urban density: 59.9/km^{2} (155/sq mi)
- Time zone: UTC+1 (CET)
  - Summer (DST): UTC+2 (CEST)
- Website: donjilapac.hr

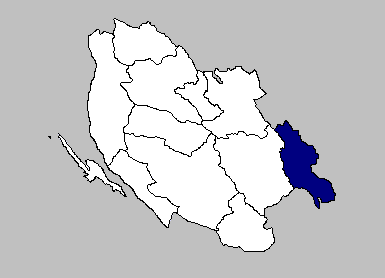
the Donji Lapac municipality within the Lika-Senj County

Donji Lapac (Serbian Cyrillic: Доњи Лапац) is a settlement and a municipality in Lika, Croatia.

== Geography ==
Donji Lapac is located a region of eastern Lika called Ličko Pounje, by the river Una that flows near the town in the valley between mountain Plješevica and Una on the altitude of 582 m. It is connected with the road that connects Bihać with Gračac.

== Climate ==
Since records began in 1982, the highest temperature recorded at the local weather station was 39.2 °C (102.6 °F), on 2 August 2017. The coldest temperature was −29.7 °C (−21.5 °F), on 13 January 2003.

== History ==
The area of Donji Lapac has been inhabited since the Iron Age, which many material remains prove. During medieval times the area of Lapac was part of old-Croatian Lapac župa, related to Lapčan family, and in 1449 it became a possession of Frankopan family. Old city Lapac was located on a nearby Obljaj hill (666 m) south from Donji Lapac. When in 1528 Ottomans conquered Lika, Lapac was absorbed. In 1790 The Croatian Corps of the Habsburg Imperial Army under the command of Feldzeugmeister Joseph Nikolaus Baron de Vins liberated Lapac as well as some other parts of Croatia in the regions of Kordun and Lika, including Cetingrad, Furjan, Boričevac and Srb, and they again became parts of the Kingdom of Croatia within the Habsburg Monarchy.

Donji Lapac was founded in 1791, in the year the Austro-Ottoman war ended and Eastern Lika was annexed by Habsburg empire as a frontier post. In the late 19th century and early 20th century, Donji Lapac was a district capital in the Lika-Krbava County of the Kingdom of Croatia-Slavonia. In 1941, Yugoslav partisans liberated the district center.

During the Croatian War of Independence, Donji Lapac was incorporated into the unrecognized breakaway Republic of Serbian Krajina. In August 1995, it was returned to Croatian control following victories by the Croatian army.

== Demographics ==
According to the 2011 census, the town has population of 946 and a municipality of 2,113 people. Before the war the area was almost entirely Serb-populated with only 0.67% Croats (according to the 1991 census). After the war the area of Donji Lapac municipality grew smaller because villages of Donji Srb and Gornji Srb were given to Municipality of Gračac in Zadar County. However, according to the 2011 census Serbs continue to constitute a majority of 80.6%, with 18.8% of Croat population.

| Year of census | total | Serbs | Croats |
|---|---|---|---|
| 1910 | 11,971 | 10,601 (88.55%) | 1,367 (11.41%) |
| 1991 | 4,603 | 4,460 (96.89%) | 31 (0.67%) |
| 2001 | 1,880 | 1,383 (73.56%) | 471 (25.05%) |
| 2011 | 2,113 | 1,704 (80.64%) | 397 (18.79%) |
| 2021 | 1,366 | 1,082 (79.21%) | 266 (19.47%) |

Some Croats or Serbs declared their ethnicity as Yugoslav.

=== Municipality of Donji Lapac ===
According to the 2021 census, municipality of Donji Lapac had 1,366 inhabitants.

Municipality of Donji Lapac: Population trends 1857–2021
v

| population | 8553 | 10305 | 9481 | 10774 | 11691 | 11971 | 11529 | 11465 | 6641 | 6735 | 6456 | 5645 | 4845 | 4603 | 1880 | 2113 | 1366 |
| | 1857 | 1869 | 1880 | 1890 | 1900 | 1910 | 1921 | 1931 | 1948 | 1953 | 1961 | 1971 | 1981 | 1991 | 2001 | 2011 | 2021 |

Sources: Croatian Bureau of Statistics publications

Note: It became independent municipality in 2001 census, from old Comune of Donji Lapac.

==== 1991 census ====
According to the 1991 census, Municipality of Donji Lapac had 4,603 inhabitants, which were ethnically declared as this:

Municipality of Donji Lapac
1991
total: 4,603
1. Serbs 4,460 (96.9%)
2. Yugoslavs 54 (1.17%)
3. Croats 31 (0.67%)
4. Muslims 16 (0.34%)
5. Macedonians 9 (0.19%)
6. Greeks 3 (0.06%)
7. Montenegrins 2 (0.04%)
8. Roma 1 (0.02%)
9. Slovenes 1 (0.02%)
10. others 1 (0.02%)
11. nondeclared 9 (0.19%)
12. regionally declared 1 (0.02%)
13. unknown 15 (0.32%)

==== Austro-Hungarian 1910 census ====
According to the 1910 census, Municipality of Donji Lapac had 11,971 inhabitants, which were linguistically and religiously declared as this:

| Population by language | Croatian or Serbian | German | Slovene |
|---|---|---|---|
| Municipality of Donji Lapac | 11,968 (99.97%) | 2 (0.01%) | 1 (0.00%) |

| Population by religion | Eastern Orthodox | Roman Catholics |
|---|---|---|
| Municipality of Donji Lapac | 10,601 (88.55%) | 1,370 (11.44%) |

=== Donji Lapac (settlement itself) ===
According to the 2011 census, settlement of Donji Lapac had 946 inhabitants.

Settlement of Donji Lapac: Population trends 1857–2011
v

| population | 1237 | 1475 | 1466 | 1142 | 1102 | 1140 | 1014 | 1008 | 667 | 726 | 1001 | 1286 | 1590 | 1791 | 812 | 946 |
| | 1857 | 1869 | 1880 | 1890 | 1900 | 1910 | 1921 | 1931 | 1948 | 1953 | 1961 | 1971 | 1981 | 1991 | 2001 | 2011 |

Sources: Croatian Bureau of Statistics publications

Note: From 1857–1880 include data for the settlement of Gajine.

==== 1991 census ====
According to the 1991 census, settlement of Donji Lapac had 1,791 inhabitants, which were ethnically declared as this:

Donji Lapac
1991
total: 1,791
1. Serbs 1,742 (97.3%)
2. Yugoslavs 22 (1.22%)
3. Croats 14 (0.78%)
4. Muslims 6 (0.33%)
5. Macedonians 2 (0.11%)
6. Montenegrins 2 (0.11%)
7. others 1 (0.05%)
8. nondeclared 2 (0.11%)

==== Austro-Hungarian 1910 census ====
According to the 1910 census, settlement of Donji Lapac had 1,140 inhabitants in 2 hamlets, which were linguistically and religiously declared as this:

| Population by language | Croatian or Serbian | German | Slovenian |
|---|---|---|---|
| Donji Lapac | 1,042 | 1 | 1 |
| Lapački Zbjeg | 96 | - | - |
| Total | 1,138 (99.82%) | 1 (0.08%) | 1 (0.08%) |

| Population by religion | Eastern Orthodox | Roman Catholics |
|---|---|---|
| Donji Lapac | 936 | 108 |
| Lapački Zbjeg | 78 | 18 |
| Total | 1,014 (88.94%) | 126 (11.05%) |

== Politics ==
=== Minority councils and representatives ===
Directly elected minority councils and representatives are tasked with consulting tasks for the local or regional authorities in which they are advocating for minority rights and interests, integration into public life and participation in the management of local affairs. At the 2023 Croatian national minorities councils and representatives elections Serbs of Croatia fulfilled legal requirements to elect 10 members minority council of the Municipality of Donji Lapac.

Serbian is co-official with Croatian at the municipal level in Donji Lapac.

As of 2023, only some of the legal requirements for the fulfillment of bilingual standards have not been carried out. Official buildings, street and traffic signs do have Cyrillic signage, but not seals. Cyrillic is only used on some official documents for public reading. There are public legal and administrative employees proficient in the script. Preserving traditional Serbian place names and assigning street names to Serbian historical figures is legally mandated and carried out.

== Economy ==
Donji Lapac is underdeveloped municipality which is statistically classified as the First Category Area of Special State Concern by the Government of Croatia. Before the war, Donji Lapac had a developed wood and textile industry. Many people worked in the transportation company Likatrans which employed more than 200 people. Today most of the inhabitants are unemployed and jobs are mostly restricted to public services or the renewed wood industry. Additionally many people work in basic agriculture, growing mostly potatoes and plums from which they make the alcohol Slivovitz.

== Settlements in municipality of Donji Lapac ==
- Birovača
- Boričevac
- Brezovac Dobroselski
- Bušević
- Dnopolje
- Dobroselo
- Doljani
- Donji Lapac
- Donji Štrbci
- Gajine
- Gornji Lapac
- Gornji Štrbci
- Kestenovac
- Kruge
- Melinovac
- Mišljenovac
- Nebljusi
- Oraovac

== Notable people ==
- Milan Đukić, Croatian Serb politician
- Veljko Narančić, Yugoslav athlete
- Stevo Krnjajić, Yugoslav actor

== Literature ==
- Savezni zavod za statistiku i evidenciju FNRJ i SFRJ, popis stanovništva 1948, 1953, 1961, 1971, 1981. i 1991. godine.
- Knjiga: "Narodnosni i vjerski sastav stanovništva Hrvatske, 1880–1991: po naseljima, autor: Jakov Gelo, izdavač: Državni zavod za statistiku Republike Hrvatske, 1998., ISBN 953-6667-07-X, ISBN 978-953-6667-07-9;
