= List of high schools in Zagreb =

This is the list of schools providing secondary education in Zagreb, Croatia.

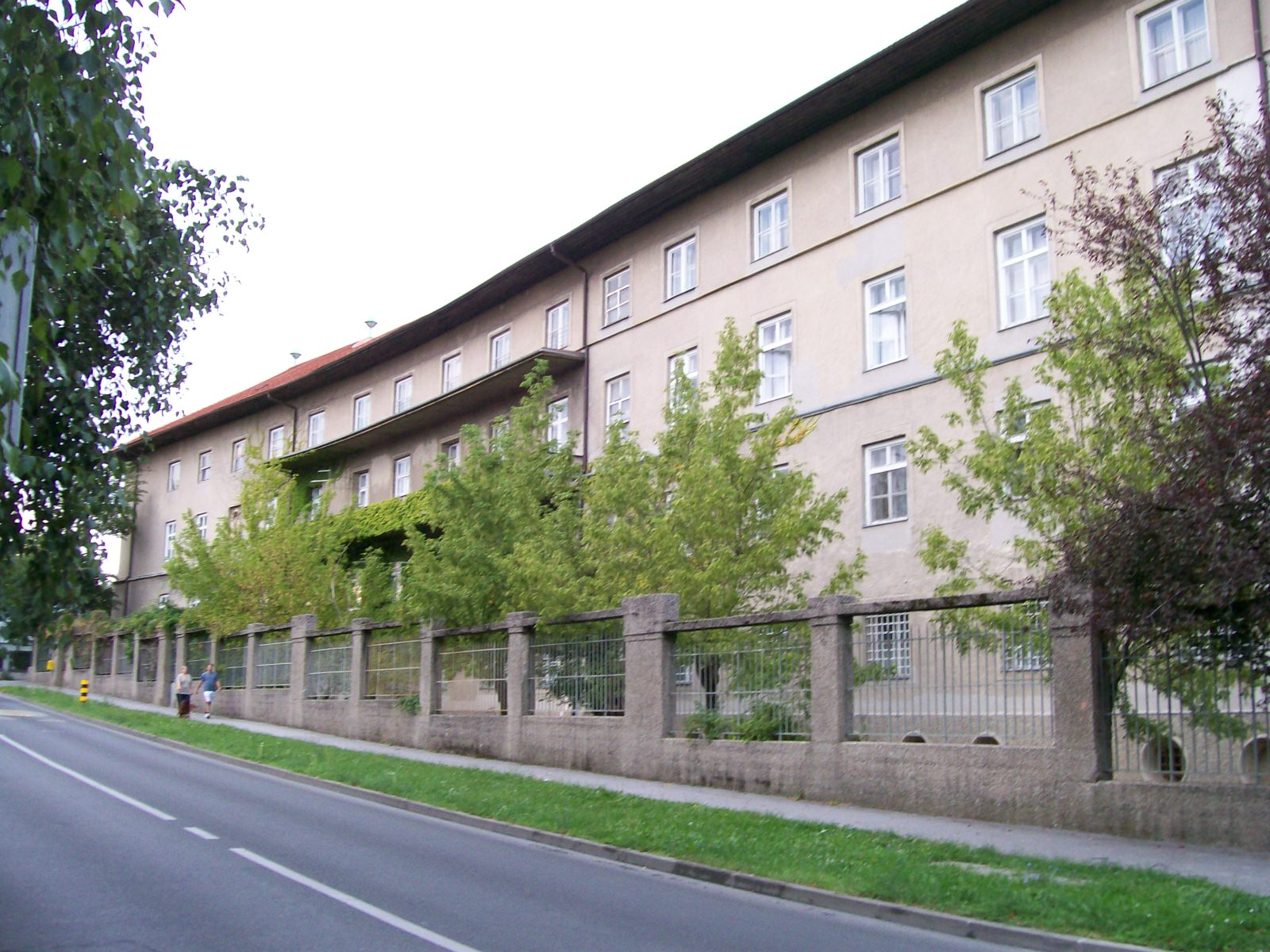
Archdiocesan Classical Gymnasium

- Agricultural School Zagreb
- Archdiocesan Classical Gymnasium
- Architectural Technical School Zagreb
- Benedikt Kotruljević - high school and school of economics
- Carpenter School Zagreb
- Center for education and training of children and youth Dubrava
- Center for education and training Slava Raškaj
- Center for education and training "Vinko Bek" Zagreb
- Classical Gymnasium in Zagreb
- College for Jazz and Popular Music
- Economics schools:
  - The First School of Economics Zagreb
  - The Second School of Economics Zagreb
  - The Third School of Economics Zagreb
- Electrical Engineering Trade School Zagreb
- Electrotehnic School Zagreb
- First High School of Informatics
- First Private Gymnasium Zagreb
- The first private school for personal services
- First Technical School Tesla
- Food Technology School of Zagreb
- Geodetic Technical School Zagreb
- Graphic School in Zagreb
- Public Gymnasiums:
  - I Gymnasium
  - II Gymnasium
  - III Gymnasium
  - IV Gymnasium
  - V Gymnasium
  - Gornji Grad Gymnasium
  - VII Gymnasium
  - Tituš Brezovački Gymnasium
  - IX Gymnasium
  - X Gymnasium
  - XI Gymnasium
  - XII Gymnasium
  - XIII Gymnasium
  - Lucijan Vranjanin Gymnasium
  - XV Gymnasium
  - XVI Gymnasium
  - XVII Gymnasium
  - XVIII Gymnasium
- High School - Center for Training and Education Zagreb
- High School Sesvete, Sesvete
- Hospitality and Tourism College of Zagreb
- Hotel and Tourism School in Zagreb
- Industrial Engineering School Zagreb
- INOVA - private school for economics
- Islamic Secondary School "Dr. Ahmed Smajlović"
- Jure Kuprešak - the first private tourist and catering high school
- Katarina Zrinski - private secondary school of economics
- LINIGRA - private secondary school
- Machinery and Technical School Faust Vrančić
- Machinery and Technical School Fran Bošnjaković Zagreb
- Medical College Zagreb
- Music College Elly Bašić Zagreb
- Music School Blagoja Bersa Zagreb
- Music School Pavle Markovac Zagreb
- Music School Vatroslav Lisinski Zagreb
- Music School Zlatko Baloković Zagreb
- Natural Scientific School Vladimir Prelog
- Postal and Telecommunications School of Zagreb
- Private Art Gymnasium
- Private Classical Gymnasium Zagreb
- Private economic and IT schools with public rights
- Private Gymnasium "Dr.Časl"
- Railway Technical School Zagreb
- School for Montage of Installation and Metal Structures Zagreb
- School for Nurses Mlinarska Zagreb
- School for Nurses Vinogradska Zagreb
- School for Nurses Vrapče Zagreb
- School for Road Transport Zagreb
- School for Textiles, Leather and Design Zagreb
- School of Applied Art and Design Zagreb
- School of Classical Ballet Zagreb
- School of Contemporary Dance Ana Maletić Zagreb
- School of Midwifery Zagreb
- The second general private gymnasium
- Secondary school of Administration Zagreb
- Serbian Orthodox Secondary School "Kantakuzina Katarina Branković"
- Sport Gymnasium
- SVIJET - private language and computer gymnasium
- Technical School Ruđer Bošković Zagreb
- Trade School for Personal Services Zagreb
- Trade School Zagreb
- Trades and Industry Building School Zagreb
- Veterinary School of Zagreb
- Women's Gymnasium of the Sisters of Mercy Zagreb
- Zagreb Art Gymnasium Zagreb

== See also ==
- List of high schools in Croatia
