= 1943 Zagreb street execution =

World War II crime in Croatia

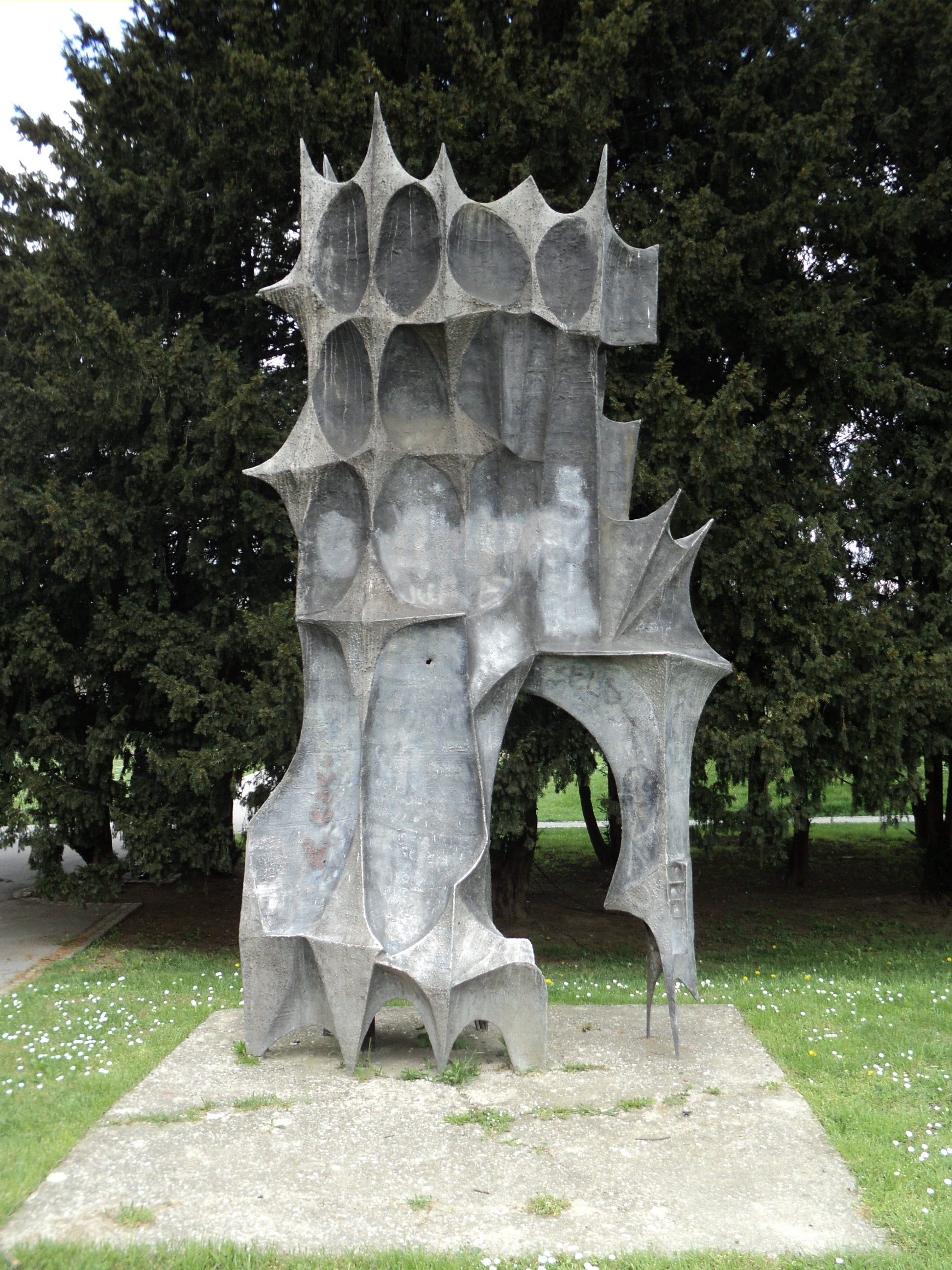
- Monument to the victims, by Dušan Džamonja
- Location: 45.825°N 16.038°E

On 20 December 1943, during World War II in Yugoslavia, the Ustaše regime of the Independent State of Croatia executed a group of sixteen hostages connected to the anti-fascist resistance by hanging them in the street near Dubrava, Zagreb. The victims included prominent intellectuals, such as Bogdan Ogrizović. This was the first such public mass murder in the city, which increased awareness of the true nature of the fascist regime at the time. It marked the onset of a period of extreme terror that lasted until the end of the war.

== Background ==
After the Axis invasion of Yugoslavia in 1941, Nazi Germany and Fascist Italy set up the Independent State of Croatia (Croatian: Nezavisna Država Hrvatska, NDH), a puppet state run by the Ustaše, a fascist organization which terrorized the civilian minority populations and any anti-fascist opponents, notably organizing the genocide of the Serbs, the Jews and the Roma in numerous concentration camps.

The capital of the NDH was the city of Zagreb, which was under the control of the Ustaše since the invasion. The Partisans, a resistance organization led by the Communist Party of Yugoslavia, had numerous underground activists in the city, who helped organize several sabotages and recruited people to leave for the liberated areas in the countryside. The resistance activities were countered by a brutal repression at the hands of the Ustaše Surveillance Service, which routinely apprehended suspects and tortured them in prisons, and used the nearby forest of Dotrščina for the execution of thousands.

In late 1943, the World War II in Europe was shifting towards Allied victory, and the Partisans in Yugoslavia gained Allied backing in the Tehran conference. The capitulation of Italy in September led to major gains for the Partisans in the southern regions of the NDH territory, and they were able to hold the second session of the AVNOJ in late November. The Germans made several attempts to suppress the Partisans in 1943, including major offensives such as January Operation Weiss, May Operation Schwarz, and December Operation Kugelblitz, but despite inflicting major casualties, failed to disrupt their cohesion.

== Prelude ==
The Ministry of the Interior of the Independent State of Croatia rounded up and detained a number of people in Zagreb who they suspected of aiding the resistance movement. These included prominent intellectuals such as the architect Milovan Kovačević, taken in January, and teacher and writer Bogdan Ogrizović, taken in July. They were held hostage indefinitely without charges. The hostages were either communists or supporters of the Partisans or anti-fascists.

In March, the League of Communist Youth of Yugoslavia (SKOJ) activist Josip Preskar was shot and killed by the Ustaše in the Vlaška Street. In September, the SKOJ activist Ivica Habunek was shot and killed in Ruđer Bošković Street (also in Donji grad).

At the beginning of December, three hostages were hanged on the road between Stenjevec and Stupnik, at the western outskirts of Zagreb.

In the night of 18 to 19 December 1943, the Partisans organized the destruction of a munitions and weapons storage depot near the village of Sopnica (south of Sesvete, east of Zagreb). The Turopolje-Posavina Partisan detachment, commanded by Ivan Mladen and Marijan Badel, ambushed the NDH crew that was guarding the depot and disarmed them without a struggle. The Sesvete communists had previously recruited peasants from the nearby villages of Rugvica, Ježevo and Oborovo to dress up in Croatian Home Guard uniforms, to be able to load 37 horse-drawn wagons of equipment from the magazines, and smuggle them across the Sava river and into the forests of Turopolje. The sabotage squads set up timed charges on the three storage buildings, which detonated right after midnight in a minute-by-minute sequence. The first explosion caused the deaths of one and injuries of ten German soldiers stationed nearby. The second explosion killed 30 and wounded 17 Home Guard soldiers. The third explosion was so strong that it caused windows to shatter around the city, and a prison guard to fall to his death in Savska Street.

On the evening of 19 December, the Croatian National Theatre in Zagreb had a production of "Hasanaginica" by Milan Ogrizović, the father of the detained Bogdan Ogrizović.

== Hangings ==
In the afternoon of 20 December, a total of eighteen detainees were brought from the prisons to the tram turnaround at the western edge of Dubrava. Sixteen were hanged, while two managed to escape. Among the detainees were Bogdan Ogrizović and Milovan Kovačević, as well as several journalists of the agency "Croatia": Dr. Branimir Ivakić, Petar Mihočević, Ljubomir Sokolović, Radovan Reicherzer, Branimir Gršković.

Bogdan Ogrizović's body was left hanging on a telegraph pole for two days, before it was retrieved by his wife Slava and sister-in-law.

Milovan Kovačević resisted the hanging and was severely beaten until he lost consciousness. When he regained consciousness, he was able to use a moment of executioner inattention to flee for a nearby cornfield. Using the cover of the fog and the rain, he managed to escape the site.

== Aftermath ==
The Ministry of the Interior published a proclamation on 20 December listing the names and descriptions of the executed, citing the Partisan attack on the Sopnica depot and "terrorist attacks by renegade groups", as well as a legal statute dated 30 October. The Zagreb daily newspaper "Nova Hrvatska" reported on 21 December how sixteen "police-confirmed communists" were hanged. In 1944, the escalating terror of public hangings of civilians continued to be documented by the NDH newspapers.

This was the first hanging within the city limits, and it led to higher public awareness of the nature of the fascist regime in the city. Journalist and politician Ivan Peršić noted that the killings were met with grief and outrage in Zagreb — especially the public execution of Ogrizović, the only son of Milan Ogrizović, in Peršić's words, deemed one of the "most deserving Croats" in the field of literature.

Bogdan Ogrizović's wife Slava managed to bury her husband's body. She was afraid for her own safety and wanted to flee the city, but had to wait until early 1944. The city perimeter was guarded both by Ustaše outposts and by roaming Cossack patrols who threatened to rob and murder people.

Milovan Kovačević survived, and soon afterwards joined the Partisans in Slavonia and later in Topusko, where he survived until the end of the war. He was once told that his escape story was so incredible that he was suspected to be a double agent for the Ustaše.

The hangings and other acts of terror were indicative of the weakening position of the occupying forces, which were forced to concentrate on the city of Zagreb, as the resistance started to gain a foothold in the surrounding hilly areas of Žumberak, Moslavina, Bilogora and Kalnik. The increasing violence and repression through 1944 led to the resistance organizations prioritizing extraction of any compromised activists from the city, to the extent that in early 1945 they ceased all local organizing and instead waited for the liberation.

== Legacy ==
The term Prosinačke žrtve, lit. 'December Victims' is sometimes used in Croatian to commemorate this mass murder. A monument was erected to commemorate the killings in 1960, the work of the sculptor Dušan Džamonja.

== Sources ==
- Novak, Božidar (2008). "Pluralizam i borba za hrvatsku državnost" [Pluralism of the Croatian struggle for statehood]. MediAnali : International scientific journal of media, journalism, mass communication, public relations, culture and society (in Croatian). 2 (3). University of Dubrovnik: 149–166.
- Galović, Krešimir (6 September 2001). "Modernistički duh tridesetih - Arhitekt Milovan Kovačević, u povodu skorašnje izložbe u Hrvatskom muzeju arhitekture, Zagreb". Vijenac (196).
- Jakovina, Tvrtko (29 December 2018). "Žrtvovanje prosinačkih žrtava na oltaru revizionizma" [Sacrificing the December Victims at the Altar of Revisionism]. Nacional (in Croatian). Zagreb. ISSN 1330-9048.
- Vrabec Mojzeš, Zrinka (8 May 2026). "ZAGREB SE BORI 'Da su Ogrizovići zažmirili na strahote ustaškog režima, ništa im se ne bi dogodilo'". Nacional (in Croatian).
- Magašić, Mauricije (1984). "Omladina Zagreba u borbi". In Grakalić, Ladislav (ed.). Revolucionarni omladinski pokret u Zagrebu 1941-45: zbornik povijesnih pregleda i sjećanja (in Croatian). Vol. I. Zagreb: GK SSRNH - GO SUBNOR - Sveučilišna naklada Liber – via Kartografija otpora, Rosa Luxemburg Foundation Southeast Europe.
- Grakalić, Ladislav, ed. (1984). Revolucionarni omladinski pokret u Zagrebu 1941-45: zbornik povijesnih pregleda i sjećanja (in Croatian). Vol. II. Zagreb: Sveučilišna naklada Liber – via Kartografija otpora, Rosa Luxemburg Foundation Southeast Europe.
- Hariš, Ivan (1980). Dnevnik diverzantskih akcija u Hrvatskoj (in Croatian). Zagreb: Spektar – via Kartografija otpora, Rosa Luxemburg Foundation Southeast Europe.
