= Ogrizović =

Ogrizović may refer to:

- Bogdan Ogrizović (1913–1943), Croatian and Yugoslav activist and educator
- Milan Ogrizović (1877–1923), Croatian playwright and politician
- Steve Ogrizovic (born 1957), English football coach and player of Serbian descent
