= Ivo Grbić =

Ivo Grbić may refer to:

- Ivo Grbić (artist) (1931–2020), Croatian artist
- Ivo Grbić (footballer) (born 1996), Croatian footballer
