= Ivo Grbić (artist) =

Croatian artist (1931–2020)

Ivo Grbić (25 November 1931 – 19 July 2020) was a Croatian artist. He was born in Dubrovnik, with family roots in Župa dubrovačka.

== Biography ==
He completed his early education in Dubrovnik before enrolling at the Academy of Fine Arts in Zagreb in 1951, where he graduated from the graphic department in 1956. His professors were Tomislav Krizman, Krsto Hegedušić, Marijan Detoni, and others. He specialized in painting under Prof. Antun Mezdjić until 1958. In addition to painting and graphics, he dealt with ceramics and small sculptures (medals and plaques), and especially with applied graphics. He was the author of numerous posters, charters, plaques and other visual art for cultural and scientific institutions in Zagreb, Dubrovnik and elsewhere. He designed numerous private collections and galleries in the country and abroad.

From 1960 to 1982, he was a professor at the graphic arts department of the School of Applied Arts in Zagreb, where he educated many graphic artists and designers. He held 31 solo exhibitions and participated in more than 150 collective exhibitions at home and abroad.

He was awarded the second prize at the competition for the Dubrovnik Summer Festival poster in 1954, the awards for the Dubrovnik Tourist Association plaque, the Dubrovnik Tourist Association's 1987 acknowledgments, and the 2002 Lifetime Achievement Award.

He mainly dealt with music, old Dubrovnik, folklore, sea and portraits (more than a thousand portraits of artists from Dubrovnik Summer Festival).

In the Serbian-Montenegrin attack on Dubrovnik on 6 December 1991, the building in which he lived and worked was burned down, along with a small gallery on the ground floor and complete inventory: all paintings, drawings and graphics, ceramics, ethnographic and antique collections, libraries, written documentation, and many more valuable and beloved items. Later, on the outer walls of the building, he placed more exhibitions of his works and documents on the suffering of Dubrovnik in 2001.

In 2011, he published the Book of Memories.

He died on 19 July 2020, aged 89. At the time, Dubrovnik mayor Mato Franković stated: “Mister Ivo Grbić was not only the soul of the City, he was also the seal of the Dubrovnik Summer Festival.”
