= Bogdan Ogrizović =

Croatian political activist (1913–1943)

- Born: 30 March 1913; Zagreb, Croatia-Slavonia, Austria-Hungary (now Croatia)
- Died: 20 December 1943 (aged 30); Zagreb, Independent State of Croatia (now Croatia)
- Resting place: Mirogoj Cemetery
- Education: University of Zagreb
- Occupation: Teacher
- Political party: Communist Party of Yugoslavia; Communist Party of Croatia
- Relatives: Milan Ogrizović (father)

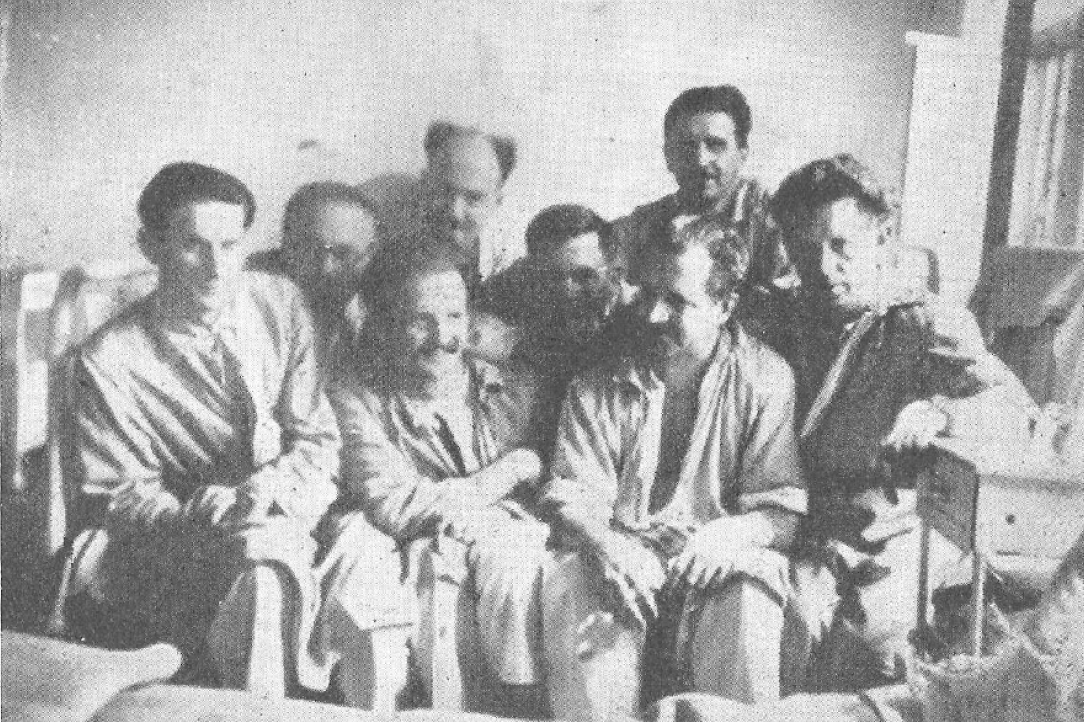
Political prisoners, including Bogdan Ogrizović (centre left) held at the Rebro Hospital in Zagreb in September 1943

Bogdan Ogrizović (pronounced [bǒgdan ogrǐːzovit͡ɕ]; 30 March 1913 – 20 December 1943) was a Croatian and Yugoslav activist and educator.

== Early life ==
Ogrizović graduated mathematics and physics from the University of Zagreb in 1933. He worked for one and a half year as a teaching assistant to university professor Stanko Hondl before teaching physics at the I Gymnasium and then the V Gymnasium in Zagreb. In 1934, Ogrizović became a member of the Communist Party of Yugoslavia. In 1941, following the World War II invasion of Yugoslavia and establishment of the Axis puppet state of the Independent State of Croatia (NDH), Ogrizović supported the Yugoslav Partisans by gathering intelligence and providing other forms of aid. He became the secretary of the 4th district committee of the Communist Party of Croatia. In May 1943, Ogrizović became the head of the National Liberation Committee (narodnooslobodilački odbor) of the city of Zagreb. Ogrizović, nicknamed Grizi by personal friends, married Slava Vrinjanin.

== Arrest and execution ==
Ogrizović was arrested on 2 July 1943. While in detention in the Petrinjska Street prison, he was tortured for three weeks. After a while he was transferred to the Savska Street prison and then to the Rebro Hospital. Finally he was returned to the Savska Street prison and designated a hostage (intended as a protection against attacks of the Partisans against the NDH targets). While he was imprisoned, Slava unsuccessfully contacted several officials of the NDH government to obtain her husband's release.

In the night of 18/19 December 1943, the Partisans destroyed an ammunition storage in the Sopnica area near Sesvete (a present-day district of Zagreb). The next day, Ogrizović and fifteen other hostages were taken to the Dubrava area of Zagreb, where he and most of the others were summarily executed by hanging. Journalist and politician Ivan Peršić noted that the killings were met with grief and outrage in Zagreb — especially the public execution of Ogrizović, the only son of Milan Ogrizović, in Peršić's words, deemed one of the "most deserving Croats" in the field of literature. Ogrizović is buried at the Mirogoj Cemetery.

== Legacy ==
According to historian Tvrtko Jakovina, Ogrizović's position in the Communist Party of Croatia meant that he would have likely become the Mayor of Zagreb had he survived the war. The V Gymnasium was renamed after Ogrizović from 1946 to 1990. A plaque commemorating Ogrizović and the student Predrag Heruc is still found in the entrance hall of the Gymnasium. A library in the centre of Zagreb is named after Ogrizović.

== Sources ==
- Čunko, Tatjana (2024). "Skice za biografiju pijanistice i glazbene pedagoginje Danice Pollak-Ogrizović (1905-1976)" [Sketches for a Biography of the Pianist and Music Pedagogue Danica Pollak-Ogrizović (1905-1976)]. Arti musices (in Croatian). 55 (1). Zagreb: Croatian Musicological Society: 43–70. ISSN 0587-5455.
- Jakovina, Tvrtko (29 December 2018). "Žrtvovanje prosinačkih žrtava na oltaru revizionizma" [Sacrificing the December Victims at the Altar of Revisionism]. Nacional (in Croatian). Zagreb. ISSN 1330-9048.
- Marinić, Mario (20 December 2019). "Na današnji dan 1943. ubijen je profesor Bogdan Ogrizović" [Professor Bogdan Ogrizović Killed on This Day of the Year 1943]. Nacional (in Croatian). Zagreb. ISSN 1330-9048.
- Paver, Josipa (1984). "Braća Špalj — Milan, Branko i Luka Bogdan Ogrizović" [Špalj Brothers — Milan, Branko and Luka Bogdan Ogrizović]. Senjski zbornik: Prilozi za geografiju, etnologiju, gospodarstvo, povijest i kulturu (in Croatian). 10–11 (1). Senj: Senj City Museum: 279–280. ISSN 1849-0999.
