= Čista Mlaka =

Village in Zagreb County, Croatia

- Village
- Interactive map of Čista Mlaka
- Coordinates: 45°46′16″N 16°10′48″E
- Country: Croatia
- County: Zagreb

Population (2011)
  - Total: 582

Čista Mlaka is a village near Rugvica, Croatia. In the 2011 census, it had 582 inhabitants.
