= Prevlaka, Zagreb County =

Prevlaka
- Interactive map of Prevlaka

Population (2011)
  - Total: 98

Prevlaka is a village near Rugvica, Croatia. In the 2011 census, it had 98 inhabitants.
