= Archdiocesan Classical Gymnasium (Zagreb) =

Archdiocesan Classic Gymnasium
- Nadbiskupska klasična gimnazija s pravom javnosti

Location
- Voćarska 106; 10000 Zagreb; Croatia; 45°49′24″N 15°59′9″E

Information
- School type: Catholic High School
- Religious affiliation: Catholic
- Established: 1920; 106 years ago
- Founder: Anton Bauer
- Headmaster: Ljuba Duvnjak
- Language: Croatian
- Campus: Urban
- Website: nkg-zagreb.hr
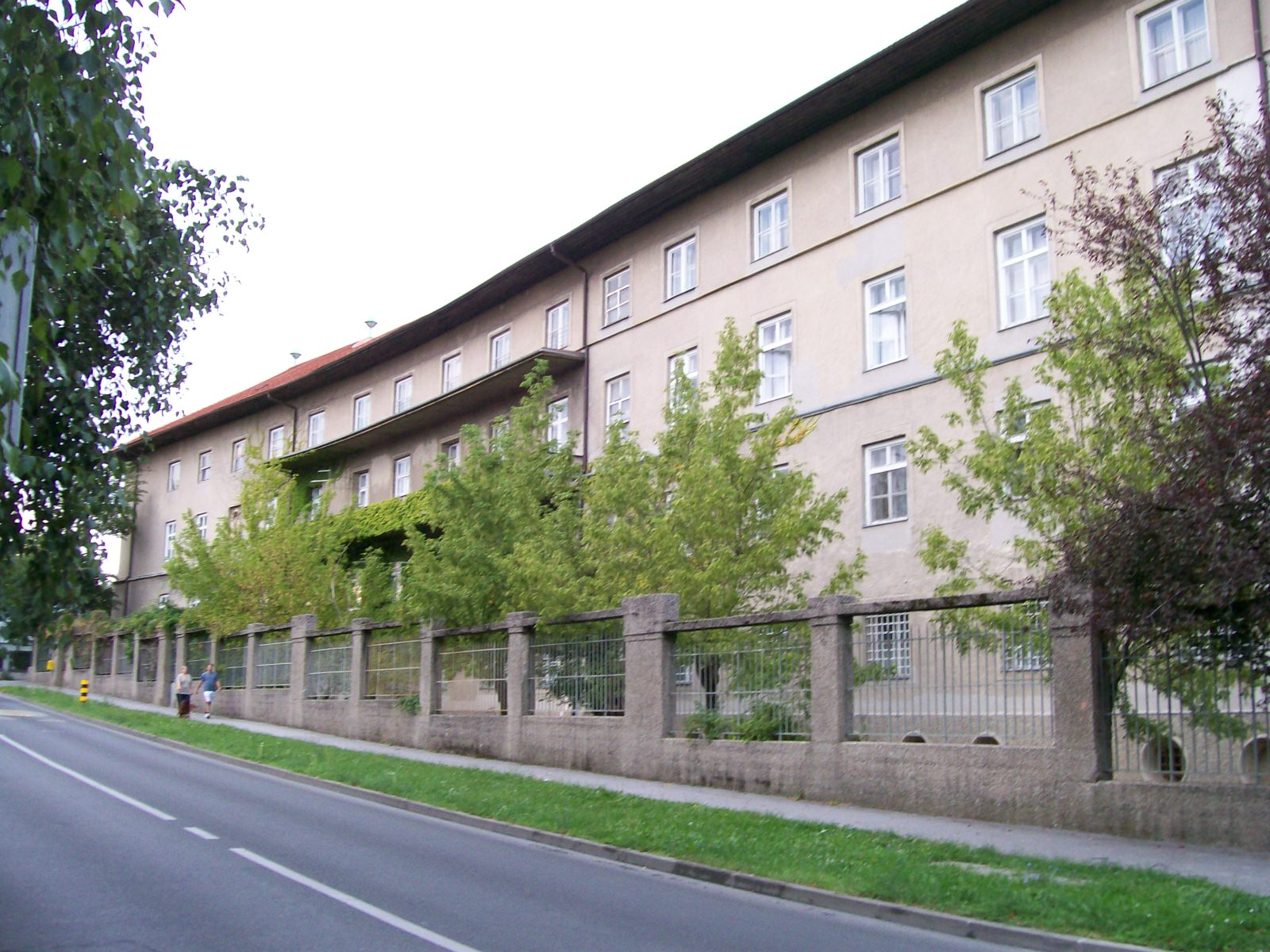
- Viewed from Voćarska Road

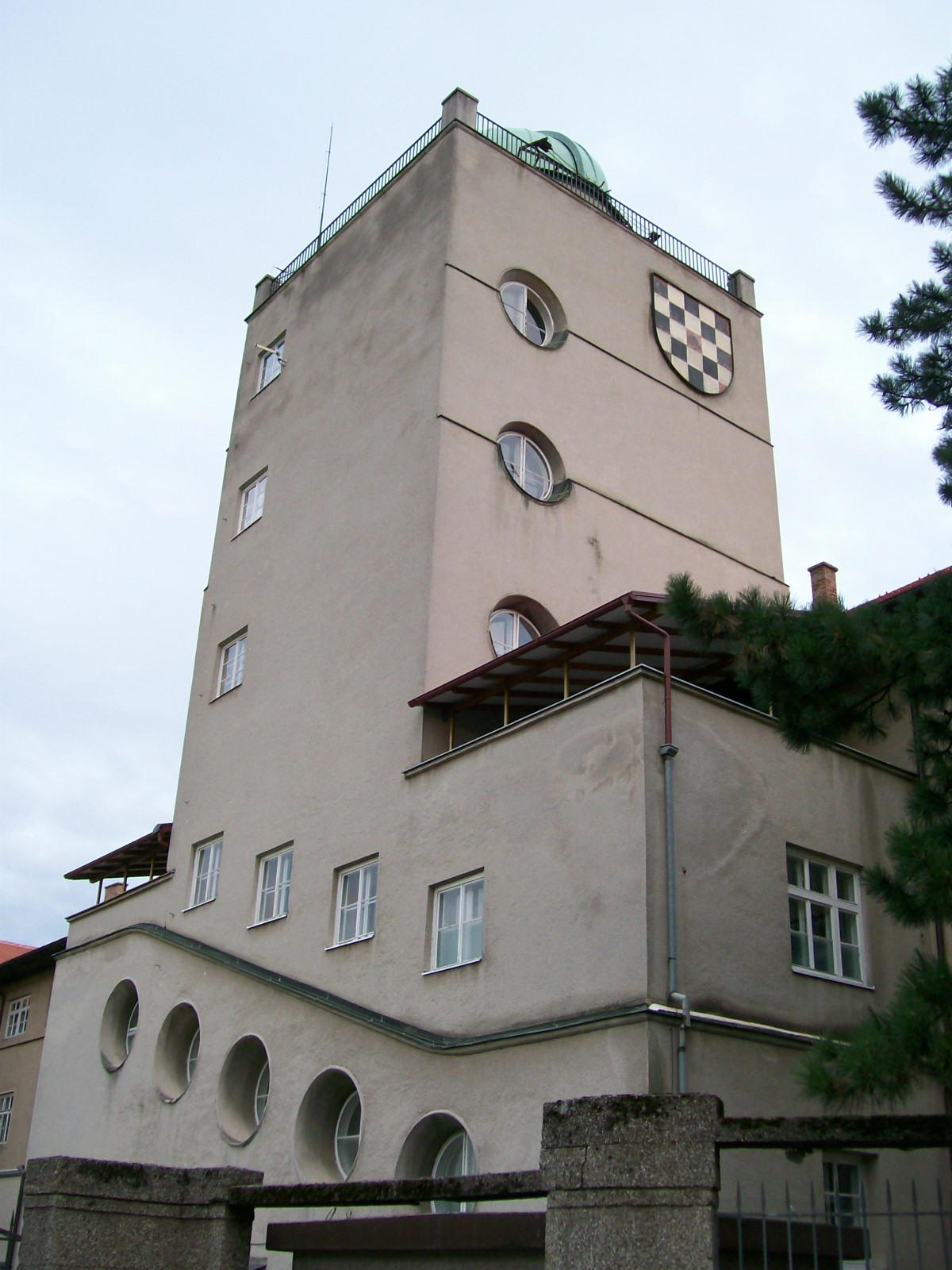
The observatory

The Archdiocesan Classic Gymnasium (Croatian: Nadbiskupska klasična gimnazija s pravom javnosti, often referred to by the abbreviation NKG) is a Catholic high school located on 106 Voćarska Road in the neighborhood of Šalata in Zagreb, Croatia. The school implements a program highlighting classical culture and history, enabling students to learn the Latin and Ancient Greek languages. The school promotes Catholicism and serves as a public preparatory school for the Interdiocesan Boys' Seminary, a seminary for future Catholic priests located in the same building complex.

== History ==
The school was the successor to the Archdiocesan Lyceum. The Lyceum was founded in 1854 as a part of the Theology seminary. The school was founded in 1922 as the Archdiocesan Grand School (Croatian: Nadbiskupska velika gimnazija), originally a boys-only school. In 1931 its name was changed to the name it bears today. In 1948 the communist regime of Josip Broz Tito denied official recognition to the school due to its religious ties. The school didn't stop operating, though. A military hospital was built nearby on the same lot. In 1989 the hospital was moved to a new complex on the Gojko Šušak Avenue in Dubrava. Following the Croatian declaration of independence in 1991, the school was again officially recognized. From 2003 girls are allowed to enroll the school, which had previously been boys-only. This diffused its previous religious role as a place to educate future priests and deacons, although Catholicism and devotion to God is still strongly encouraged.

== Observatory ==
The school is known in Croatia for having an observatory. The school routinely publishes articles about celestial objects on its website. The school website also displays a list of objects in the Messier catalogue. The observatory building sports the Croatian coat of arms on its northern side.

== See also ==
- List of astronomical observatories
