= Križanićeva Street Gymnasium Building =

- Interactive map of the Križanićeva Street Gymnasium Building area

General information
- Status: in use
- Type: Gymnasium
- Architectural style: International
- Location: Križanićeva 4-4A, Zagreb, Croatia
- Coordinates: 45.8085°N 15.9873°E
- Current tenants: II Gymnasium; VII Gymnasium; Classical Gymnasium; XVI Gymnasium
- Construction started: 1930
- Completed: 1932

Design and construction
- Architect: Egon Steinmann
- Designations

Cultural Good of Croatia
- Official name: Zgrada Gimnazije
- Type: Protected cultural good
- Reference no.: Z-2147

The Gymnasium Building in Križanićeva Street 4/4a is a 1930s historical building in Donji grad, Zagreb, Croatia.

It was designed by the architect Egon Steinmann. The construction started in 1930 and completed in 1932. It was designated a cultural good and placed under state protection in 2005.

Steinmann was one of the architects working for the Technical Department of the Sava Banovina, an administrative division of the Kingdom of Yugoslavia at the time. It was built in the then-modern International Style. He also designed a similar smaller gymnasium building in Kušlanova Street that was built in 1934–37.

At the time it was opened, it was the largest and most modern school building in this part of town, with the first real gym. During World War II in Yugoslavia, it was temporarily repurposed for military use, later for a military hospital. In 1944, the bombing of Zagreb in World War II caused significant damage, reducing its capacity for a while.

The building has hosted the following high schools since 1991:

- Entrance 4
  - II Gymnasium
  - VII Gymnasium
- Entrance 4a
  - Classical Gymnasium
  - XVI Gymnasium
