= Dubrava, Zagreb =

Dubrava
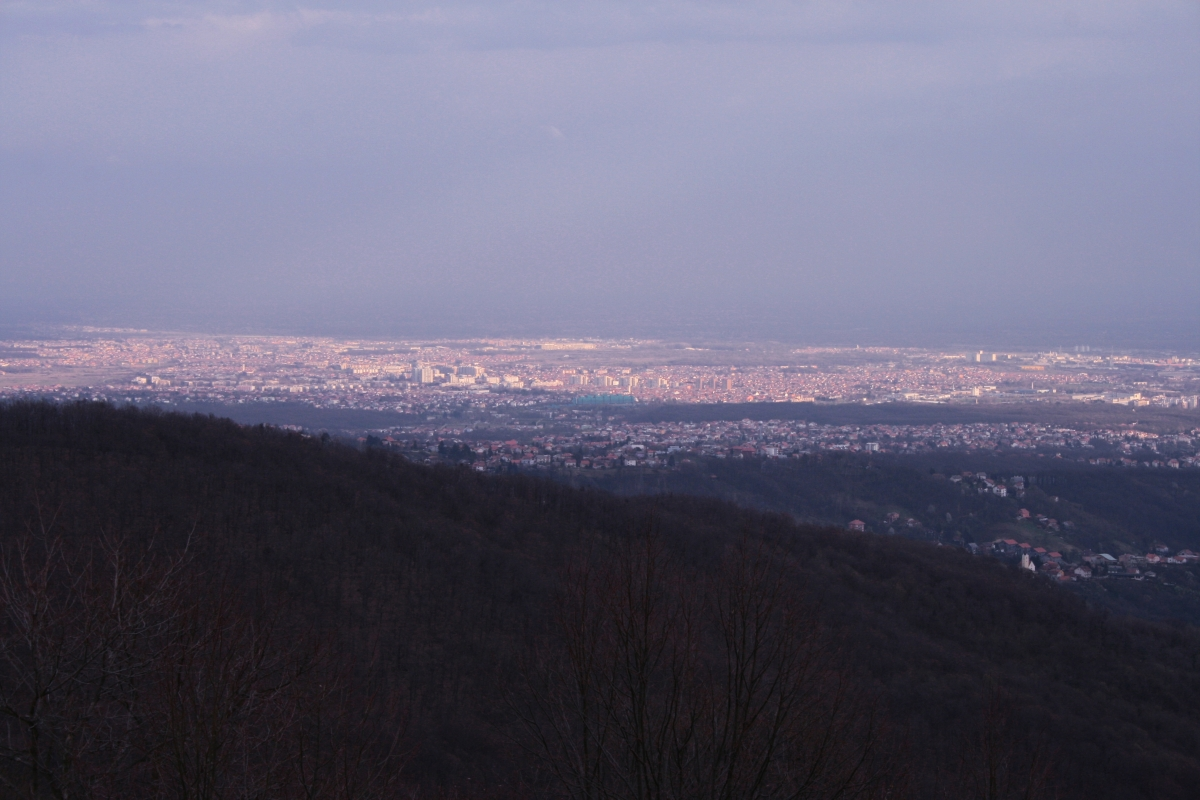
- Dubrava as seen from Medvedgrad

- Location in Croatia
- Coordinates: 45°49′46″N 16°03′21″E
- Country: Croatia
- City: Zagreb

Population (2011)
  - Total: 98,204
- Time zone: UTC+1 (CET)

Dubrava is a large urban area in east Zagreb, Croatia. It is located in the northeastern part of the city and divided by the Dubrava Avenue into two administrative areas:

- Gornja Dubrava (Upper Dubrava), population 61,841 (2011)
- Donja Dubrava (Lower Dubrava), population 36,363

The name comes from a Slavic toponym for oak forests. The species of oak that grows in this area is Quercus robur L.

== History ==
In its earliest days Dubrava was no more than a village, consisting of a couple of houses and gardens. It slowly grew, mostly because of intensive settling of people from all over Croatia to the city of Zagreb and surrounding areas. By the 1930s Dubrava had over hundred inhabitants and was connected with Zagreb via road.

When World War II in Zagreb began, Dubrava already had electrical power and 250 inhabitants. During the war it was a partisan base due to its relative distance from other major cities and simultaneous closeness to Zagreb, making it an ideal place from which partisans could operate within Zagreb itself. As the war progressed, the partisans intensified their activities in Dubrava. Due to the increasing successes of the resistance in Dubrava, the occupation forces sent army members to take control of Dubrava. In December 1943, they terrorized Dubrava when they publicly murdered 16 partisan supporters, notably Bogdan Ogrizović. Following the liberation of Yugoslavia, these people were declared national heroes and several monuments were built in their honor in the Park of December Victims and on the corner of the Konjščinska Street.
