= Oborovo =

Coordinates: 45°40′56″N 16°15′11″E

- Interactive map of Oborovo

Oborovo is a village near Rugvica, Croatia. In the 2011 census, it had 662 inhabitants.

== Climate ==
Since records began in 1986, the highest temperature recorded at the local weather station was 39.8 °C (103.6 °F), on 24 August 2012. The coldest temperature was −24.3 °C (−11.7 °F), on 25 January 2000.
