= XI Gymnasium =

High school in Zagreb, Croatia

- XI. gimnazija

Location
- 77 Savska street 9; 10000 Zagreb; Croatia
- 45°47′50.352″N 15°57′43.416″E

Information
- School type: All-purpose gymnasium
- Motto: Dobra lokacija, još bolja edukacija. (Good location, even better education.)
- Established: 1926; 100 years ago
- Founder: Stjepan Radić
- Headmaster: Maja Sečić-Kopinč
- Grades: 4 (9 to 12)
- Classes: 16
- Language: Croatian, English, German, Italian, Polish
- Website: Jedanaesta gimnazija

The Eleventh Gymnasium (Croatian: Jedanaesta gimnazija) is a public secondary school in Zagreb, Croatia, established in 1926. The school, as of 2021, has 465 students enrolled, and 16 classes. The principal is Maja Sečić-Kopinč.

The school shares a building with the teaching faculty of Zagreb University.

== History ==
The establishment of the school was approved in 1926, the first principal being Branko Škare. The building which the school currently is located inside was constructed in 1937, by the Catholic women's order Sisters of Charity (Croatian: Sestre Milosrdnice). The order founded an all-purpose same-sex gymnasium for girls. Alozije Stepinac personally blessed the opening of the new building.

During World War II, it temporarily served as a hospital for the wounded, housing up to 300 soldiers and civilians. After the war, however, the name of General Women's Gymnasium was abolished, and became known as the Eleventh Gymnasium. It adopted to a co-educational system and secular curriculum from that point on. In 1962, the school moved to Doboj street in the neighbourhood of Trešnjevka.

In 1977, following the educational reforms by Stipe Šuvar, the school merged with the Fifth and Seventh Gymnasiums and changed its name to the Bogdan Ogrizović Education Centre (Croatian: Pedagoško-obrazovni centar „Bogdan Ogrizović“). Šuvar was a prominent Croatian politician and sociologist and member of the communist party who greatly influenced the education system of 1970s Yugoslavia.

In 1991, the newly fledged nation of Croatia renamed it to the Eleventh (although better known in its roman numeral form, XI) Gymnasium.

The school's buildings were heavily damaged in the 2020 Zagreb earthquake.

== Alumni ==
After the school year 2023/24, 84 graduates of this gymnasium enrolled at an institution of higher learning in Croatia, or 95.45% of students who took up the nationwide Matura exams. The most common destinations for these students were the University of Zagreb faculties of economics, humanities and social sciences, law, teaching, as well as the Catholic University of Croatia.
