= II Gymnasium Zagreb =

Public high school in Zagreb, Croatia

II Gymnasium
- II. gimnazija

Location
- Ulica Jurja Križanića 4 HR-10000 Zagreb; Croatia
- 45.8085°N 15.9865°E

Information
- Former names: Royal II Real Gymnasium (1912); Royal II Male Real Gymnasium; State II Male Real Gymnasium; II Male Gymnasium; II Gymnasium (1945); Ribar Brothers Gymnasium; Education Center for Culture and Arts (1973); II Gymnasium (1991)
- School type: Public, Gymnasium
- Established: 1912; 114 years ago
- Secondary years taught: 9–12
  - Grade 9: 156 (2024–25)
- Language: Croatian
- Website: Official website (in Croatian)
- Last updated: June 17, 2025

Second Gymnasium (Croatian: II. gimnazija, Druga gimnazija) is a high school in Zagreb, Croatia. It operates in the Križanićeva gymnasium complex in Donji grad.

After the school year 2023/24, 146 graduates of this gymnasium enrolled at an institution of higher learning in Croatia, or 94.81% of students who took up the nationwide Matura exams. The most common destinations for these students were the University of Zagreb faculties of law, medicine, economics, electrical engineering and computing, and science.
