= Rugvica =

- Municipality
- Municipality of Rugvica
- Location of Rugvica in Croatia
- Coordinates: 45.75°N 16.23°E
- Country: Croatia
- County: Zagreb County

Area
  - Municipality: 93.7 km^{2} (36.2 sq mi)
  - Urban: 12.0 km^{2} (4.6 sq mi)

Population (2021)
  - Municipality: 7,133
  - Density: 76.1/km^{2} (197/sq mi)
  - Urban: 704
  - Urban density: 58.7/km^{2} (152/sq mi)
- Time zone: UTC+1 (Central European Time)
- Vehicle registration: ZG
- Website: rugvica.hr

Rugvica is a village and a municipality in Croatia in the Zagreb County.

In the 2011 census, there were 7,871 inhabitants, in the following settlements:

- Čista Mlaka, population 582
- Črnec Dugoselski, population 191
- Črnec Rugvički, population 96
- Donja Greda, population 117
- Dragošička, population 387
- Hrušćica, population 176
- Jalševec Nartski, population 524
- Ježevo, population 428
- Nart Savski, population 239
- Novaki Nartski, population 68
- Novaki Oborovski, population 305
- Obedišće Ježevsko, population 119
- Oborovo, population 662
- Okunšćak, population 521
- Otok Nartski, population 199
- Otok Svibovski, population 270
- Preseka Oborovska, population 154
- Prevlaka, population 98
- Rugvica, population 722
- Sop, population 404
- Struga Nartska, population 551
- Svibje, population 498
- Trstenik Nartski, population 560

In the same census, an absolute majority were Croats.
