= IV Gymnasium =

- IV. gimnazija

Location
- Žarko Dolinar Street 9; 10000 Zagreb; Croatia
- 45°46′49.1″N 15°57′43.4″E

Information
- Established: 8 November 1934; 91 years ago
- Headmaster: Sonja Kamčev-Bačani
- Classes: 21
- Language: Croatian, English, German, French
- Hours in school day: Varies from 7 to 9
- Classrooms: 25
- Nickname: Četvrta
- Website: Četvrta gimnazija

The Fourth Gymnasium (Croatian: IV. gimnazija, Četvrta gimnazija) is a public high school in Zagreb, Croatia specialising in languages. It opened its doors on 8 November 1934. Today it has about 555 students in 21 classes. It is situated at the Žarko Dolinar Street 9.

Together with the regular gymnasium curriculum, the school also offers bilingual programs in English, German and French. The IV Gymnasium is among the 10 best high schools in the country according to the results of the Croatian national exam. The principal is Sonja Kamčev-Bačani.

Getting into the school needs 76 points out of 80. The points are calculated from primary school grades, as well as competitions and extra criteria.

== History ==
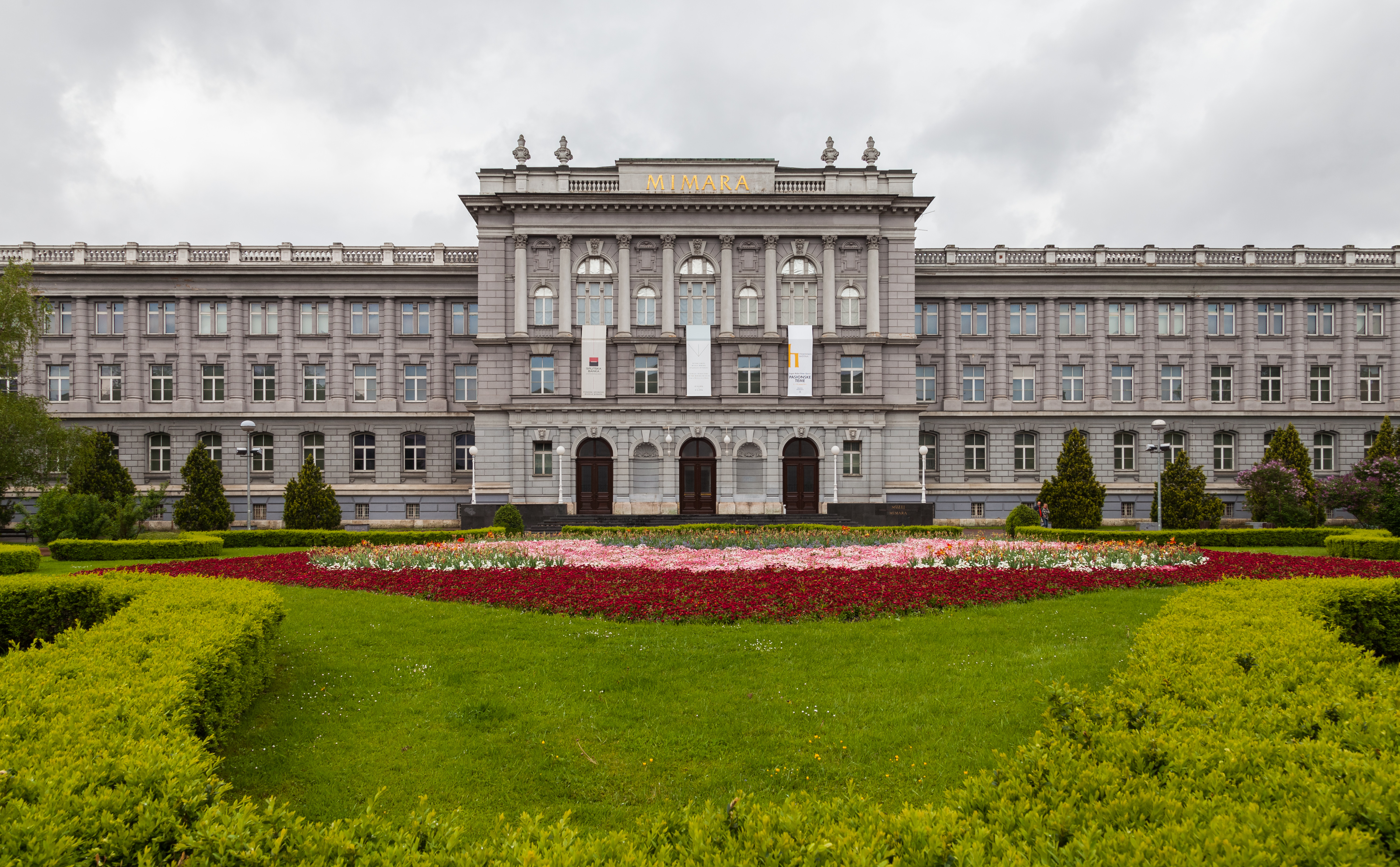
Former building of the IV Gymnasium (today Muzej Mimara)

The IV Gymnasium in Zagreb was founded on October 8, 1934. During the first month of its work, it worked as a part of I Gymnasium, but gained its independence the next month, on November 8, and named itself The State IV Gymnasium for boys in Zagreb. IV Gymnasium shared its building with the II Classical Gymnasium in the Izidor Kršnjavi Street, today a primary school. The first principal was dr. Dane Medaković.

In the report for 1940, 8 Ph.D.s worked in the school. The school moved again in 1943, to the university. With the end of the Second World War, IV Gymnasium moved to the building of the Real Gymnasium, in the southern wing, across the hotel Continental. In 1947 the school moved to Roosevelt square, where it remained until its abolishment in the year 1977, when it entered the composition of the Center.

When the school building was turned into the Mimara Museum in 1986, the school moved to various places in the city, with the directory in the Varšavska Street. Since the school year 1953/1954 the school has been co-educational, after working as a boys' school for 20 years. In 2015, three quarters of the students were girls. Up until then, the school had 14 to 20 classes every year.

With the loss of its old building on the Roosevelt square, the City of Zagreb promised to build a new building for the needs of I and IV Gymnasiums. This promise was fulfilled with the completion of a modern building in Novi Zagreb, in the neighborhood Utrine. In 2014 the school moved again, having its own building for the first time. Ever since, the school has been in the neighborhood Kajzerica.

== Programs ==
In Croatia, grades are restarted upon entering high school, so the grades are 1st-4th. Next to the name of the subject is shown how many school hours of the subject there are per week in each grade.

Subject	Language gymnasium
Subject	1st grade	2nd grade	3rd grade	4th grade
Croatian language	4	4	4	4
First foreign language	4	4	4	4
Second foreign language	4	3	3	3
Latin language	2	2	-	-
Music Appreciation	1	1	1	1
Art History	1	1	1	1
Psychology	-	-	2	-
Logics	-	-	1	-
Philosophy	-	-	-	2
Sociology	-	-	2	-
History	2	2	2	2
Geography	2	2	1	2
Mathematics	3	3	3	3
Physics	2	2	2	2
Chemistry	2	2	2	2
Biology	2	2	2	2
Information Technology	-	2	-	-
Politics and Economics	-	-	-	1
Physical Education	2	2	2	2
Elective (Religious Education or Ethics)	1	1	1	1
Foreign language	-	-	2*	2*

- In the 3rd grade, a 3rd foreign language can be picked.

== Alumni ==
After the school year 2023/24, 104 graduates of this gymnasium enrolled at an institution of higher learning in Croatia, or 89.66% of students who took up the nationwide Matura exams. The most common destinations for these students were the University of Zagreb faculties of humanities and social sciences, economics, law, science, and mechanical engineering and naval architecture.
