= School of Electrotechnics Zagreb =

School of Electrical Engineering
- Elektrotehnička škola
- Konavoska 2; 10110 Zagreb; Croatia

Information
- Established: 1959; 67 years ago
- Headmaster: Renato Matejaš
- Language: Croatian
- Website: ss-elektrotehnicka-zg.skole.hr

School of Electrical Engineering Zagreb (Croatian: Elektrotehnička škola Zagreb) is a IT and Engineering school. It was founded in 1959 as Center for educating "Rade Končar". In 1991 the school changed its name to School of Electrical Engineering which is still its name. School headmaster is Renato Matejaš.
