= School of Graphics, Design and Media Production =

Škola za grafiku, dizajn i medijsku produkciju

Location
- Getaldićeva 2 Zagreb; Croatia
- 45°48′21″N 16°01′47″E

Information
- Type: Public
- Religious affiliation: Catholic
- Established: 1894
- Principal: dr.sc. Mislav Papec
- Grades: 9th through 12th
- Enrollment: around 550
- Language: Croatian
- Website: Škola za grafiku, dizajn i medijsku produkciju

School of Graphics, Design and Media Production (Croatian: Škola za grafiku, dizajn i medijsku produkciju) is a public high school in Zagreb, Croatia. The school has 550 students and 70 employees, of which 54 are educators.

== History ==
In 1886, two book printers completed their apprenticeship in the school. Eight years later, in 1894, another group of 19 book printers finished their education there. By 1945, more than 1,500 students had completed their studies at Grafička škola u Zagrebu. By the decision of the Teachers' Council of Croatia, 1894 is considered the year of establishment of the school. As of 2024, Eleven thousand students have graduated school to date.

The main directorate of the graphics industry donated printing machinery, devices and furniture to the school.

The first school building was located in Gundulićeva 10. In 1951, Grafička škola u Zagrebu moved to its current location in Getaldiceva and acquired a part of a building where the Museum of Arts and Crafts is located today.

=== Names of the school ===
The school has changed its name numerous times:

- 1947: Savezna grafička industrijska škola (Federal School of the Graphics Industry)
- 1951: Grafička škola s praktičnom obukom (Graphics School with Practical Training)
- 1962: Grafički školski centar (School Center of Graphics)
- 1972: Grafički srednjoškolski centar (High School Center of Graphics)
- 1981: Grafički obrazovni centar "Bratstvo i jedinstvo" (Graphical Educational Center "Brotherhood and Unity")
- 1991: Grafička škola u Zagrebu (Graphics School of Zagreb)
- 2017: Škola za grafiku, dizajn i medijsku produkciju (School of Graphics, Design and Media Production) - current name

== Curriculum ==
The school has seven educational programs:

- Graphics Technician (Grafički tehničar)
- Prepress Technician (Grafički tehničar pripreme)
- Printing Technician (Grafički tehničar tiska)
- Production Technician (Grafički tehničar dorade)
- Graphics Editor – Designer (Grafički urednik – dizajner)
- Multimedia Technician (Medijski tehničar)
- Web Designer (Web dizajner)
