= V Gymnasium =

- V. gimnazija
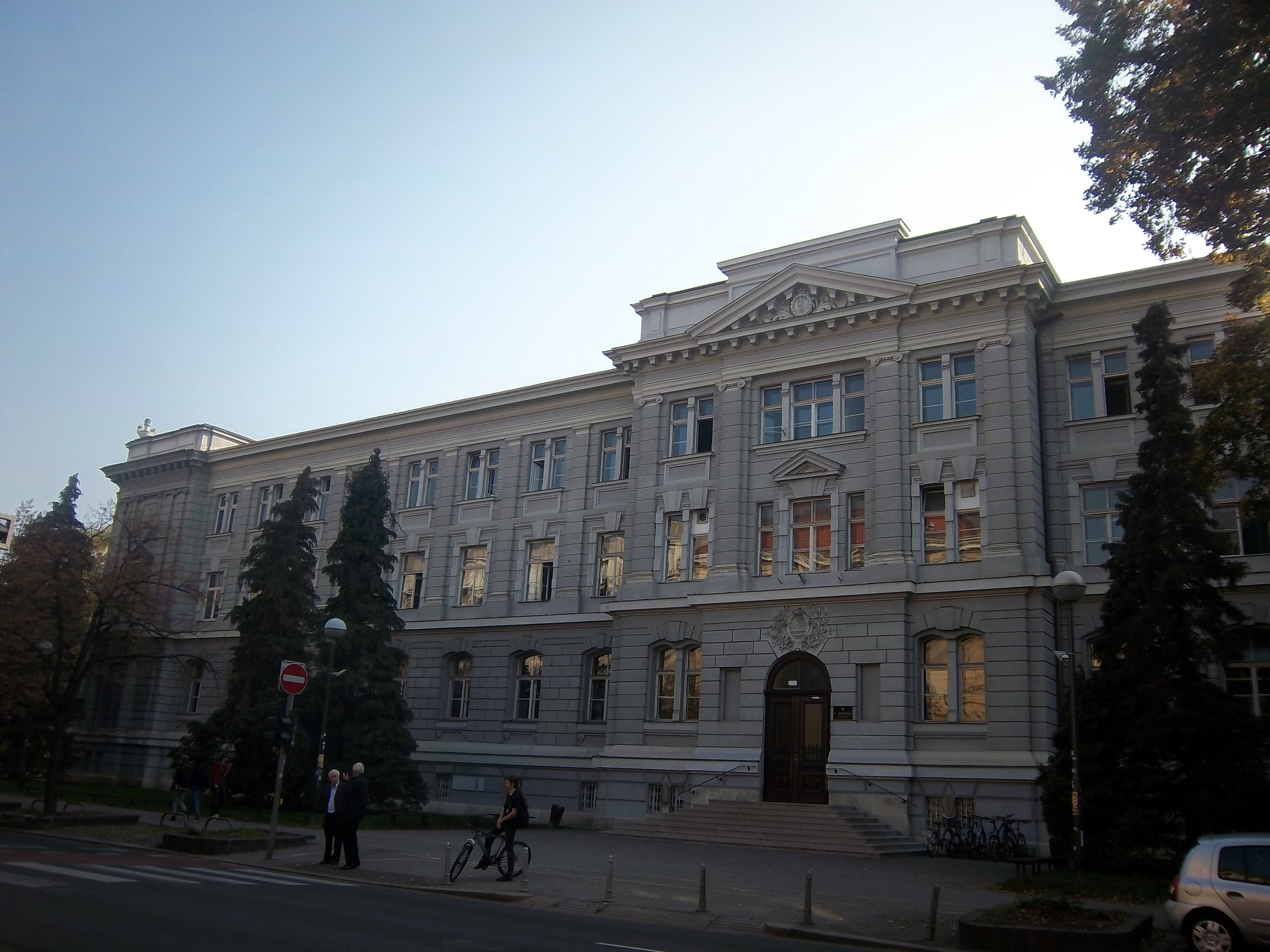

Location
- Klaićeva 1 Zagreb, 10000; Croatia
- 45°48′32″N 15°58′0″E

Information
- Established: 7 November 1938; 87 years ago
- Headmaster: Tihomir Engesfeld, dr.sc.
- Secondary years taught: 9–12
  - Grade 9: 182 (2024–25)
- Classes: 28
- Language: Croatian
- Hours in school day: On average 7 hours (varies from 6 to 9/10)
- Classrooms: 18 (+ 5 cabinets + 4 staff rooms + 8 other rooms)
- Colour: Green
- Nickname: Peta
- Website: www.petagimnazija.hr

The Fifth Gymnasium (Croatian: V. gimnazija, Peta gimnazija) is a high school in Zagreb, Croatia specialising in science and mathematics.

== History ==
The secondary school was initially founded in 1938 as a single-sex general gymnasium. It was opened on 7 November 1938 as the Fifth Male Gymnasium of Zagreb. In its first year of existence, there were 762 students enrolled, with 45 students per class.

In 1946, after World War II, its name was changed to the Fifth Gymnasium of Bogdan Ogrizović, after a prominent high school teacher of physics and mathematics who was killed during WWII.

In the period of Croatia's scrapping of the single-sex model and the creation co-educational institutions, the school merged in 1960 with the Seventh Woman's Gymnasium. After this, it transformed into a high school primarily specialising in a program of mathematics and scientific subjects.

In 1977, after a reform on education and gymnasiums, the school changed its name to the Pedagogical Education Centre. However, it still retained its emphasis and reputation for natural sciences and mathematics. In 1991, it was renamed back to the Fifth Gymnasium.

Today it has about 900 students in 28 classes. Its prestige is demonstrated by a consistent requirement of high grades for enrollment. Because of this, an extra enrollment exam has been required in addition to elementary school grades, alongside schools such as the XV Gymnasium.

Students are known for often excelling in mathematics, physics, chemistry, biology, Latin, computer science, history, geography and logic.

Also, students have taken part in the International Mathematical Olympiad and the International Chemistry Olympiad, where they have received various medals, and also the International Physics Olympiad.

== Alumni ==
After the school year 2023/24, 155 graduates of this gymnasium enrolled at an institution of higher learning in Croatia, or 90.64% of students who took up the nationwide Matura exams. The most common destinations for these students were the University of Zagreb faculties of electrical engineering and computing, medicine, science, mechanical engineering and naval architecture, and humanities and social sciences.

=== Notable alumni ===
- Sven Medvešek, a famous theatre actor in Croatia and stage director
- Rene Medvešek, a well-known theatre actor in Croatia, and additionally a stage director
- Zoran Čutura, a professional basketball player and also sports columnist
- Žarko Puhovski, a political analyst and Marxist theorist
- Davor Pavun, a physicist, university professor, inventor, and educational speaker
