= VII Gymnasium =

Public high school in Zagreb, Croatia

- VII. gimnazija

Location
- Ulica Jurja Križanića 4 HR-10000 Zagreb; Croatia
- 45.8085°N 15.9865°E

Information
- Former names: Temporary Small Female Real Gymnasium (1918); Royal Small Female Real Gymnasium (1920); Royal Small Female Real Gymnasium (1920); Royal State Female Real Gymnasium (1922); State II Female Real Gymnasium (1925); VII Female Gymnasium (1945); VII Gymnasium (1955); VII Gymnasium "Vladimir Nazor" (1965); Education Centre for Culture and Arts (1973); VII Gymnasium (1991)
- School type: Public, Gymnasium
- Established: 1918; 108 years ago
- Secondary years taught: 9–12
  - Grade 9: 156 (2024–25)
- Language: Croatian
- Website: Official website (in Croatian)
- Last updated: June 17, 2025

Seventh Gymnasium (Croatian: VII. gimnazija, Sedma gimnazija) is a high school in Zagreb, Croatia. It operates in the Križanićeva gymnasium complex in Donji grad.

After the school year 2023/24, 142 graduates of this gymnasium enrolled at an institution of higher learning in Croatia, or 93.42% of students who took up the nationwide Matura exams. The most common destinations for these students were the University of Zagreb faculties of economics, law, mechanical engineering and naval architecture, civil engineering, and science.
