= Milan Ogrizović =

Croatian author (1877–1923)

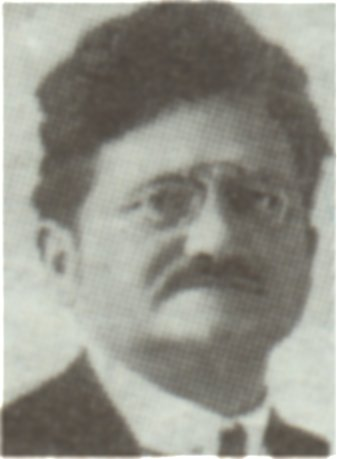
- Born: February 11, 1877; Zengg, Austria-Hungary (now Senj, Croatia)
- Died: August 25, 1923 (aged 46); Zagreb, Kingdom of Serbs, Croats, and Slovenes (now Zagreb, Croatia)
- Resting place: Mirogoj Cemetery
- Education: University of Zagreb
- Occupations: Author; playwright; politician
- Spouse: Ljuba
- Children: 2, including Bogdan
- Writing career
- Language: Croatian
- Notable work: Hasanaginica

Milan Ogrizović (pronounced [mǐlan ogrǐːzovit͡ɕ]; February 11, 1877 – August 25, 1923) was a Croatian author, playwright, politician, and academic, serving as a professor and lecturer at the Croatian National Theater. His plays are among the most commonly performed Croatian works.

== Biography ==
Milan Ogrizović was born on February 11, 1877, in Senj, the third son of Ilija Ogrizović, a postal worker, and Franjka (née Krišković). Ogrizović was raised in Zavalje by his maternal uncle, a parish priest, (Note: Croatian: župnik; variously translated as rector, parson, or parish priest) who converted him from Eastern Orthodoxy to Catholicism. He completed secondary schooling in Gospić, near his birthplace.

In 1901, Ogrizović completed his principal studies in mathematics and classical philology and, in 1904, received his doctorate in philology, both at the University of Zagreb. Between 1900 and 1906, he taught at the Classical Gymnasium in Zagreb.

Although he wrote in several mediums, Ogrizović is best known in Croatian literature as a playwright. His first play, Breath (Croatian: Dah) – inspired by Henrik Ibsen – was first performed at the Croatian National Theater in Zagreb in 1901. He became increasingly inspired by local Croatian traditions and national history. His most famous play, Hasanaginica (1909), was adapted from a 17th-century folk ballad of the same name from the Dalmatian hinterland, which earned him a Demeter's Award and remained in the National Theater's repertoire for decades. His tetralogy, Year of Love (Croatian: Godina ljubavi), consists of four one-act plays written over several years: Spring Morning (Croatian: Proljetno jutro, 1903), Summer Afternoon (Croatian: Ljetno popodne, 1904), Autumn Evening (Croatian: Jesenje veče, 1903), and Winter Night (Croatian: Zimska noć, 1906).

He served in the Sabor as a member of the nationalist Pure Party of Rights.

Ogrizović and his wife, Ljuba, were close friends of the poet and playwright Fran Galović. Galović's final letter was addressed from the Serbian front to Ogrizović:

My dear, I greet you once again. It's morning and we have to rush at 10 o'clock. It's sunny, Sunday and a wonderful, warm morning. One would really like to die on such a sunny day. Tell Sanctissima (Note: Ogrizović's wife, Ljuba. From Latin, literally 'the most sacred'.) to pray for the repose of my soul if I am gone. Your Fran loves you. (Note: Original Croatian: Moj dragi, još jednom Te pozdravljam. Jutro je i u 10 sati imamo navaliti. Sunce je, nedjelja i divno, toplo jutro. Čovjek bi čisto želio umrijeti u ovako sunčan dan. Reci Sanctissimi da se pomoli za upokoj moje duše ako me više ne bude. Ljubi te tvoj Fran.)

Ogrizović died on August 25, 1923. He is buried at Mirogoj Cemetery in Zagreb.

Ogrizović's pseudonyms included Zmaj vratnički ('The Dragon of Vratnik'), Milovan Uskok, Milovan Mladac, and Ivan Ivanović.

== Selected works ==
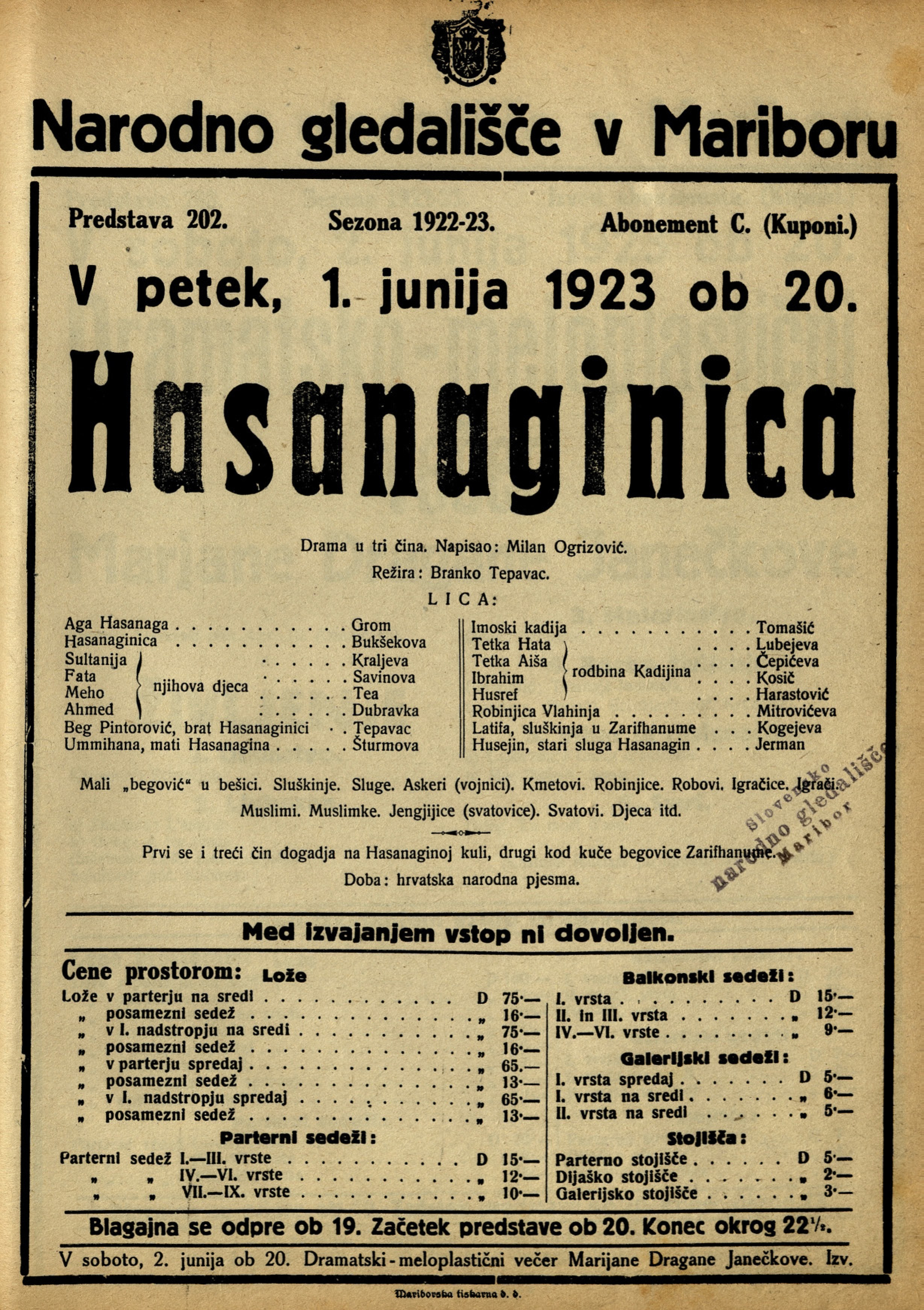
A poster for Hasanaginica to be performed in Maribor, 1923

- Breath (Croatian: Dah, 1901)
- Year of Love (Godina ljubavi)
  - Spring Morning (Proljetno jutro, 1903)
  - Summer Afternoon (Ljetno popodne, 1904)
  - Autumn Evening (Jesenje veče, 1903)
  - Winter Night (Zimska noć, 1906)
- Anathema (Note: This play has not been translated into English; its title may be variously translated as Damnation or The Malediction.) (Prokletstvo, 1907; co-authored with Andrija Milčinović)
- Hasanaginica: A Drama in Three Acts (Hasanaginica: Drama u tri čina, 1909)
- Banović Strahinja (1912)
- The Proclamation (Note: This play has not been translated into English; its title may be variously translated as The Declaration, The Annunciation, The Publication, etc.) (Objavljenlje, 1917)
- The Death of Smail Agha Čengić (Smrt Smail-age Čengića, 1919)
- Vučina (1921)
- In Wiener Neustadt (U Bečkom Novom Mjestu, 1921)
