= Tvrtko Jakovina =

Croatian historian

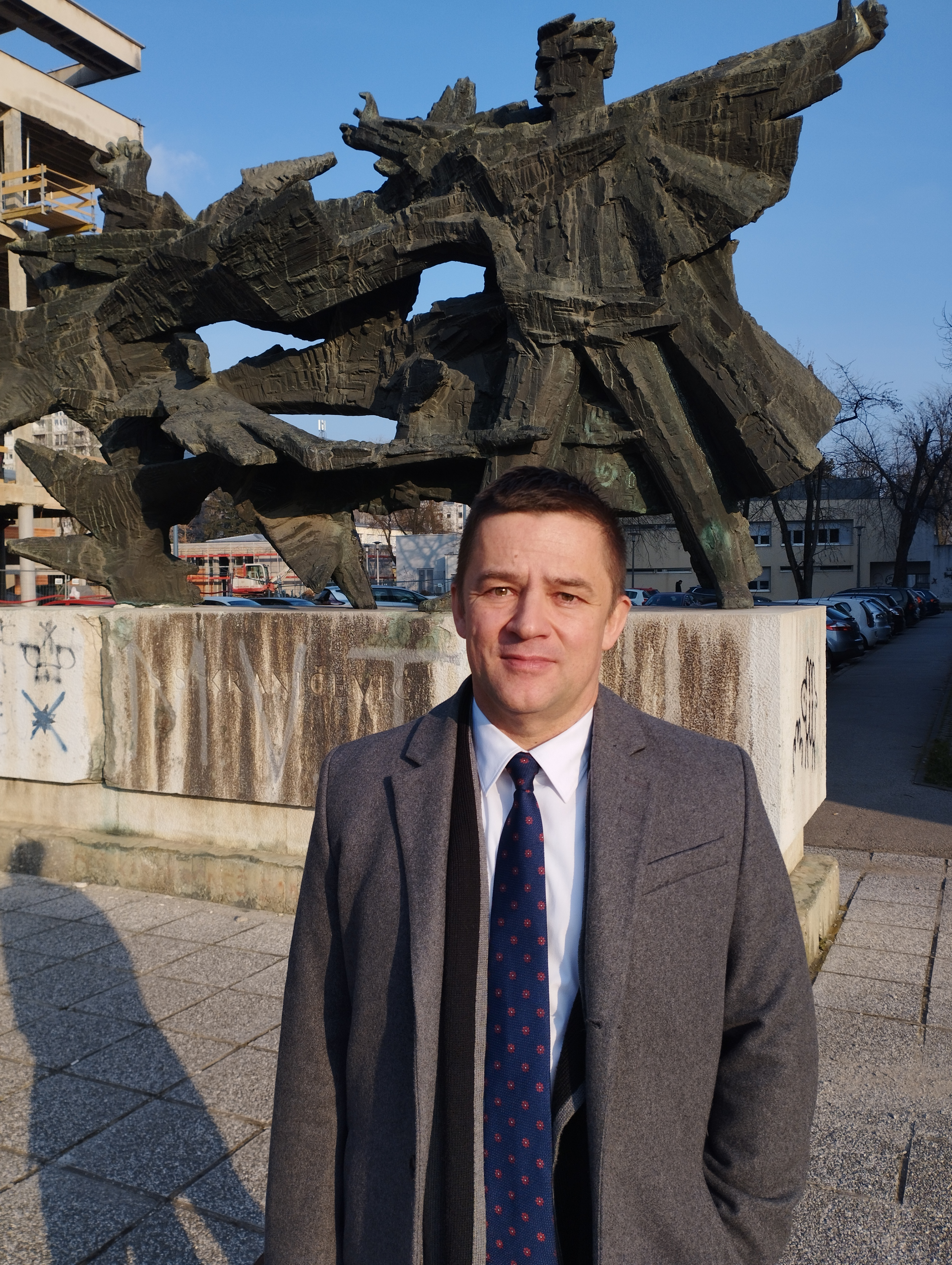
- Tvrtko Jakovina in front of the Faculty of Humanities and Social Sciences in Zagreb
- Born: 2 March 1972 (age 53); Slavonska Požega, SR Croatia, SFR Yugoslavia
- Occupation: historian
- Awards: Annual State Prize for Science (2004) and Annual Award of Association of University Professors and other scientists (2003)

Tvrtko Jakovina (born 2 March 1972) is a Croatian historian. Jakovina is a full time professor at the Department of History at the Faculty of Humanities and Social Sciences of the University of Zagreb.

== Biography ==
=== Early life ===
Tvrtko Jakovina was born in the eastern Croatian town of Požega where he finished elementary school and high school, and also completed his compulsory military service.

=== Education ===
He studied history at the University of Zagreb from 1991 to 1996. Jakovina was the founder and first honorary member of the Croatian branch of International Students of History Association. As an exchange student he attended courses at University of Kansas, USIA and Boston College. He completed his postgraduate studies at Katholieke Universiteit Leuven. During the 2000/01 academic year, he was a Fulbright Visiting Scholar at Georgetown University in Washington D.C. Since then, he has also attended London School of Economics and Political Science and seminars on the Holocaust in Israel. He defended his PhD thesis at the University of Zagreb in 2002, receiving, after the publication, the annual prize for young scientists in the fields of history and humanities.

== Academic career ==
Jakovina has presented many public lectures and attended many forums in Croatia and abroad. He has co-authored a history textbook for senior high school students and has authored hundreds of articles published in daily newspapers such as Jutarnji list and Vjesnik. Due to his publicly expressed attitudes on the importance of objectivity in historical studies, he has often been attacked by Croatian radical right-wingers. In his work, he is mostly interested in the history of the 20th century, American history, the Cold War, the Non-Aligned Movement, and the policy of detente. His books received state prizes in 2004 and 2014, while he also received Kiklop book prize in 2013. Jakovina is a coordinator of the postgraduate Diplomacy study program of the Faculty of Political Science and the Ministry of Foreign and European Affairs.

== Political and public engagement ==
Tvrtko Jakovina is a prominent public critic of the violent right-wing Croatian nationalism, historical revisionism of World War II oriented towards unscientific positive reinterpretations of the Nazi puppet state Independent State of Croatia and absent or unscientific recognition of Ustaše genocide against Serbs, Jews, Roma and other crimes against their opponents.

Jakovina has signed the CIVICO Europa initiative against autocratic policies in the fight against COVID-19 pandemic in Hungary. The initiative was signed by 73 European personalities including Jean-Claude Juncker, Carl Bildt, Slavoj Žižek and from Croatia alongside Jakovina also Miljenko Jergović, Vesna Pusić, Seid Serdarević and Željko Trkanjec.

== Publications ==
=== Books ===
- Socijalizam na americkoj pšenici [Socialism on the American Grain]. Zagreb: Matica hrvatska. 2002.
- Američki komunistički saveznik. Hrvati, Titova Jugoslavija i SAD 1945.–1955 [The American Communist Ally. Croats, Tito's Yugoslavia and the United States 1945-1955]. Zagreb: Profil International. 2003.
- Treća strana Hladnog rata [The Third Side of The Cold War]. Zaprešić: Fraktura. 2011.
- Trenuci katarze. Prijelomni događaji XX stoljeća [Moments of Catharsis. Breaking Events in the Twentieth Century]. Zaprešić: Fraktura. 2013.
- Budimir Lončar: Od Preka do vrha svijeta [Budimir Lončar: From Preko to the top of the World]. Zaprešić: Fraktura. 2020.
