= I Gymnasium Zagreb =

First Gymnasium
- I. gimnazija

Location
- 36 Avenija Dubrovnik, 10010 Zagreb; Croatia
- 45°46′38.7″N 15°59′34.8″E

Information
- School type: All-purpose grammar school
- Established: 1854; 172 years ago
- Headmaster: Dunja Marušić
- Staff: 54
- Grades: 4 (9 to 12)
- Language: Croatian, English, Russian, Spanish, Italian, German, French
- Nickname: Prva
- Website: Prva gimnazija

The First Gymnasium (Croatian: Prva Gimnazija), commonly known as I. gymnasium, is a co-educational public secondary school in Zagreb, Croatia. It was the first secular gymnasium to be established in Zagreb, and second throughout Croatia. It was founded in 1854, as a three-year schooling institution for exclusively boys. As of 2021, the principal is Dunja Marušić.

== History ==
Following the Austro-Hungarian Empire's advancements in modern secondary education, on 20 November 1854 the first secular gymnasium was opened in Zagreb. It was situated on Ćirilometodska ulica, near the Church of Saint Mark. The following year, after an influx of enrollments, the school was re-located to the Priest's tower. The school expanded during this time, to offer three grades instead of only one. In 1858, the school moved for the third time, now to Strossmayer's street, where it would stay for thirty-seven years, and a year later in 1859, a fourth grade level was implemented.

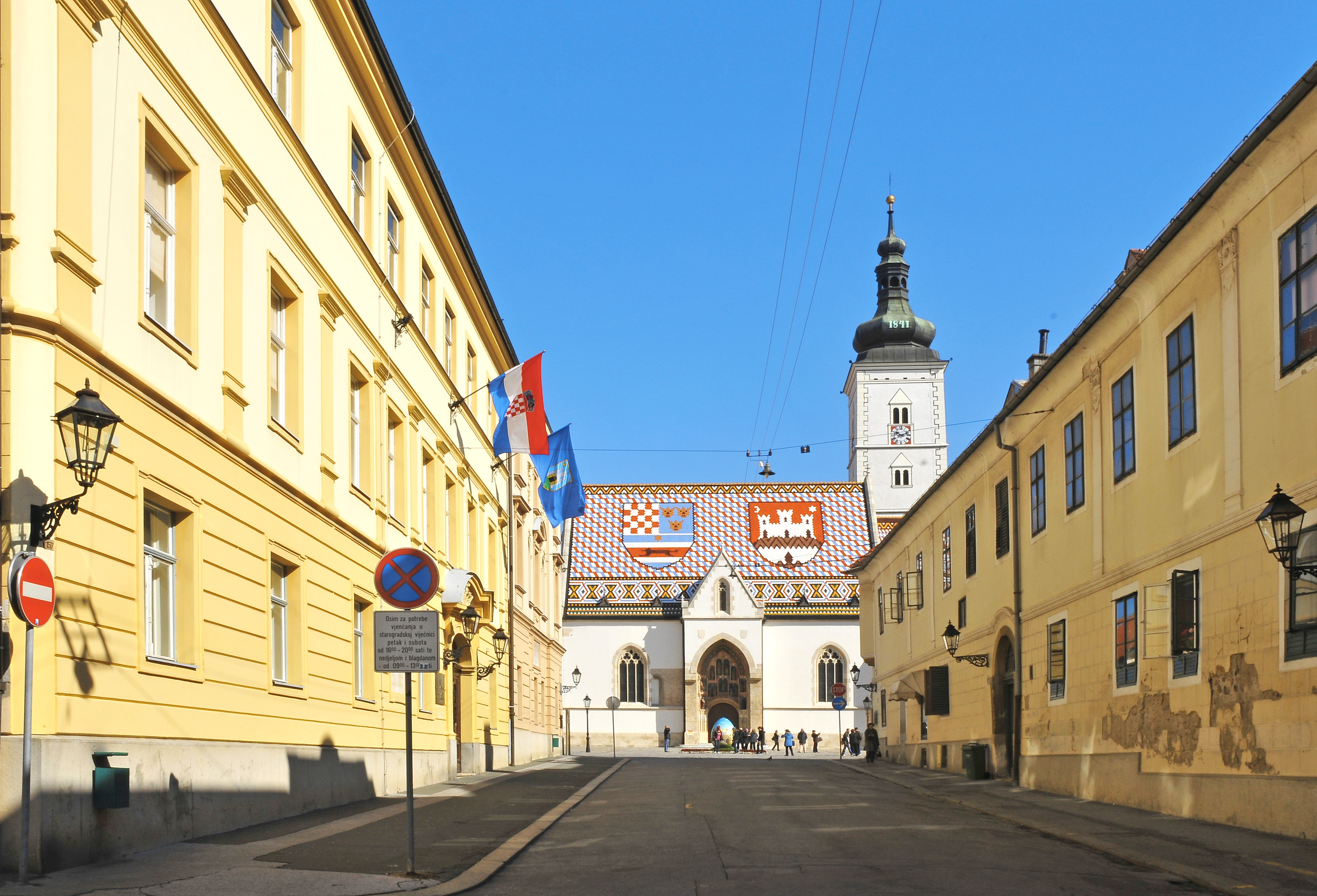
Ćirilometodska Street, where the school was initially located

In 1860, the centralist policies of Alexander von Bach were abolished. Bach's reforms had forced all schools in the empire to conduct their lessons in the German language. Since 1860, classes have been conducted in Croatian.

During Izidor Kršnjavi's education reforms of the early 1890s, the school began a process of modernization. A wide range of new buildings and facilities were constructed and the learning conditions of the school improved drastically. In 1895, during Emperor Franz Joseph visit to Zagreb, he officially opened the installations. Also, around this period, writer Franjo Bučar was introducing sports such as football, hockey, gymnastics, and fencing to the nation of Croatia. He encouraged the implementation of sport as a school subject, and thus it was implemented in the school.

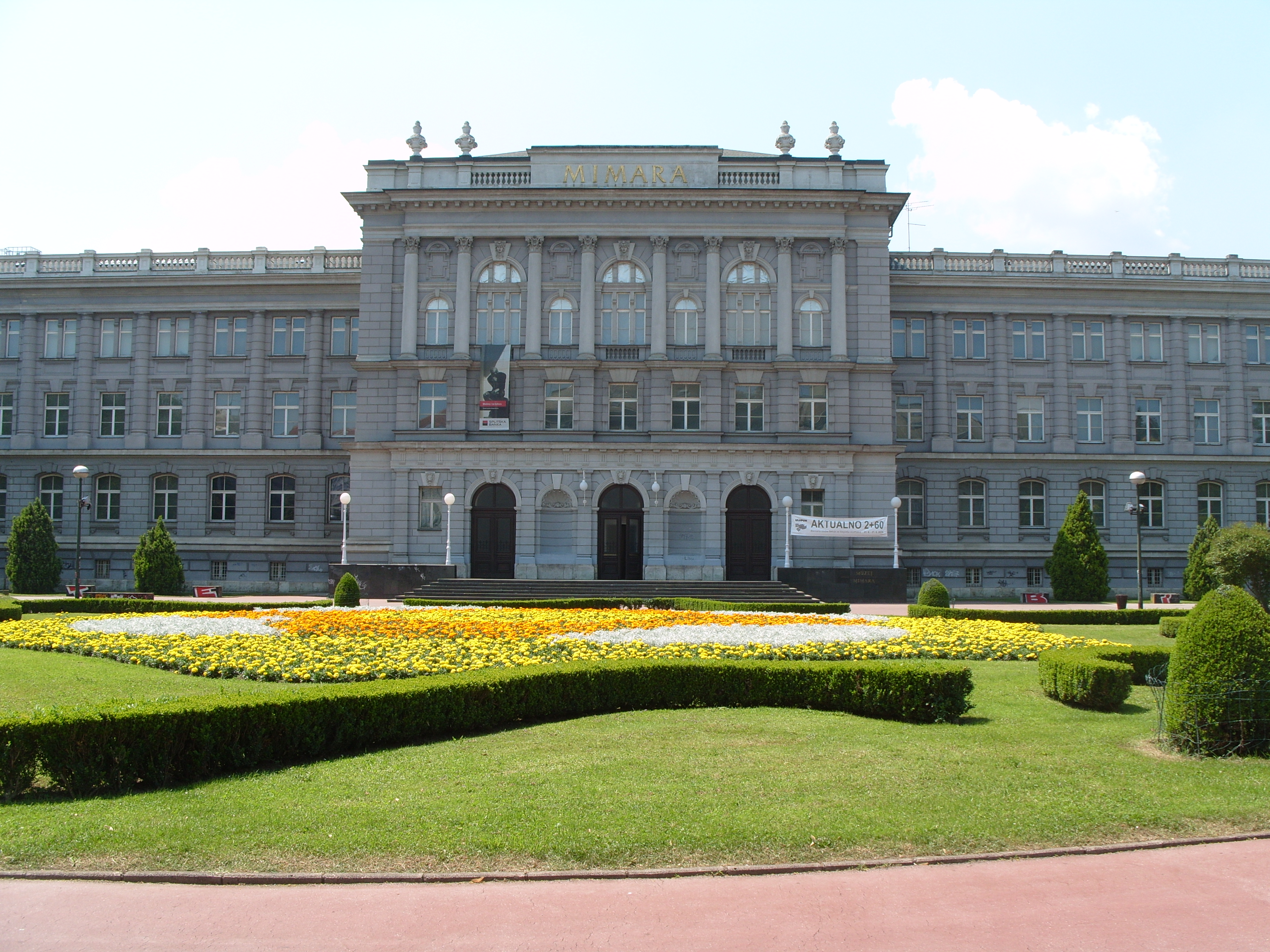
The building of the school until 1986, present day Museum Mimara

In 1895, the school moved to Roosevelt Square, into the building which now houses the Museum of Mimara.

Six years later, 1901 marked the year of girls being allowed to take end-of-high school exams on-site, giving them the qualifications to be able to enrol in higher education.

During the World War I, the school's building served as a military hospital, the actual institution temporarily re-locating to the site of an orphanage on Vladimir Nazor street. After the war finished, the students returned to Roosevelt Square. However, they could not use the full extent of the building for many years afterwards as it was also utilised for housing refugees who escaped Istria after its annexation by the Kingdom of Italy.

On 26 May 1941, the students of the first gymnasium and all high-school students of Zagreb were required to congregate in the Maksimir Stadium and divide into groups based on ethnicity, an attempt by the newly instated Independent State of Croatia (NDH) to ethnically segregate the city. However, those who were Croatian did not comply and walked over to stand with the Jewish and Serbian minorities. The school also suffered heavily in the 1944 bombing of Zagreb.

Following the establishment of Yugoslavia, sweeping education reforms across the country required all public schools to become co-educational. Girls were accepted into the school from 1954 onward, and thus the official name of the school changed to The First Gymnasium. Also in 1954, the school celebrated its 100th year anniversary by erecting a plaque with the names of all the students who had died as a result of the World War II. Ten years later, people left homeless by Zagreb's catastrophic flood in 1964 were housed in the school's buildings while their homes were being repaired.

Players from the school's handball team competed at the World School Handball championships in 1978, and won a silver medal.

On the 31 March 1977, Croatian-Yugoslav politician Stipe Šuvar's reform eliminated the institution of gymnasiums. This meant that the First Gymnasium would merge with the Fourth Gymnasium, and change the name of their institution to 'The Centre for directed education for administration and judiciary' (Croatian: Centar usmjerenog obrazovanja za upravu i pravosuđe), or CUP for short.

By an official decision from the Zagreb assembly and Croatian parliament, in the 1980s a decision was made that the building of the school was to be converted into a museum. In response, the staff of the school went on a protest strike in the spring of 1986. However, a few months later, the school was forced to re-locate from the premises. The school split their students into two separate facilities - grades 9 and 10 were situated on Warsaw Street, while grades 11 and 12 moved to Gundulić street.

In 1990, the system of gymnasiums was returned to Yugoslavia. The school now split up into three separate institutions: the original First and Fourth Gymnasiums, and an administrative faculty.

At the outbreak of the Homeland War, the basement of the school was used as a shelter for refugees. In January 1993, the school undertook a decision to move buildings once again. On 23 December the same year, the school was officially moved to its new building on Dubrovnik Avenue in New Zagreb.

In 2004, on the school's 150th anniversary, they received the City of Zagreb Award.

== Alumni ==
After the school year 2023/24, 123 graduates of this gymnasium enrolled at an institution of higher learning in Croatia, or 97.62% of students who took up the nationwide Matura exams. The most common destinations for these students were the University of Zagreb faculties of electrical engineering and computing, economics, humanities, science, and mechanical engineering and naval architecture.

=== Notable alumni ===
- Vladimir Prelog, a Nobel prize-winning organic chemist
- August Cesarec, a writer, poet, and revolutionary who fought on the side of the republicans and anti-fascists in the Spanish Civil War
- Vladimir Bakarić, a communist politician who helped establish ZAVNOH and was the first president of the socialist republic of Croatia
- William Feller, a Croatian mathematician who later moved to America
- Zoran Milanović, the current president of Croatia since 2020
- Ivo Josipović, the president of Croatia from 2010 to 2015
  Pictures of notable alumni
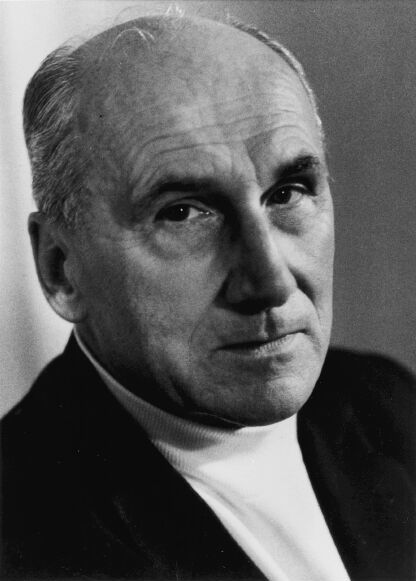
  Vladimir Prelog
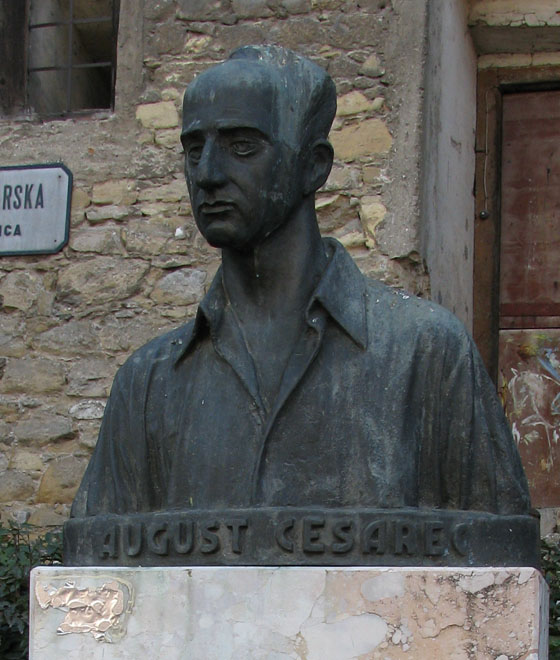
  August Cesarec
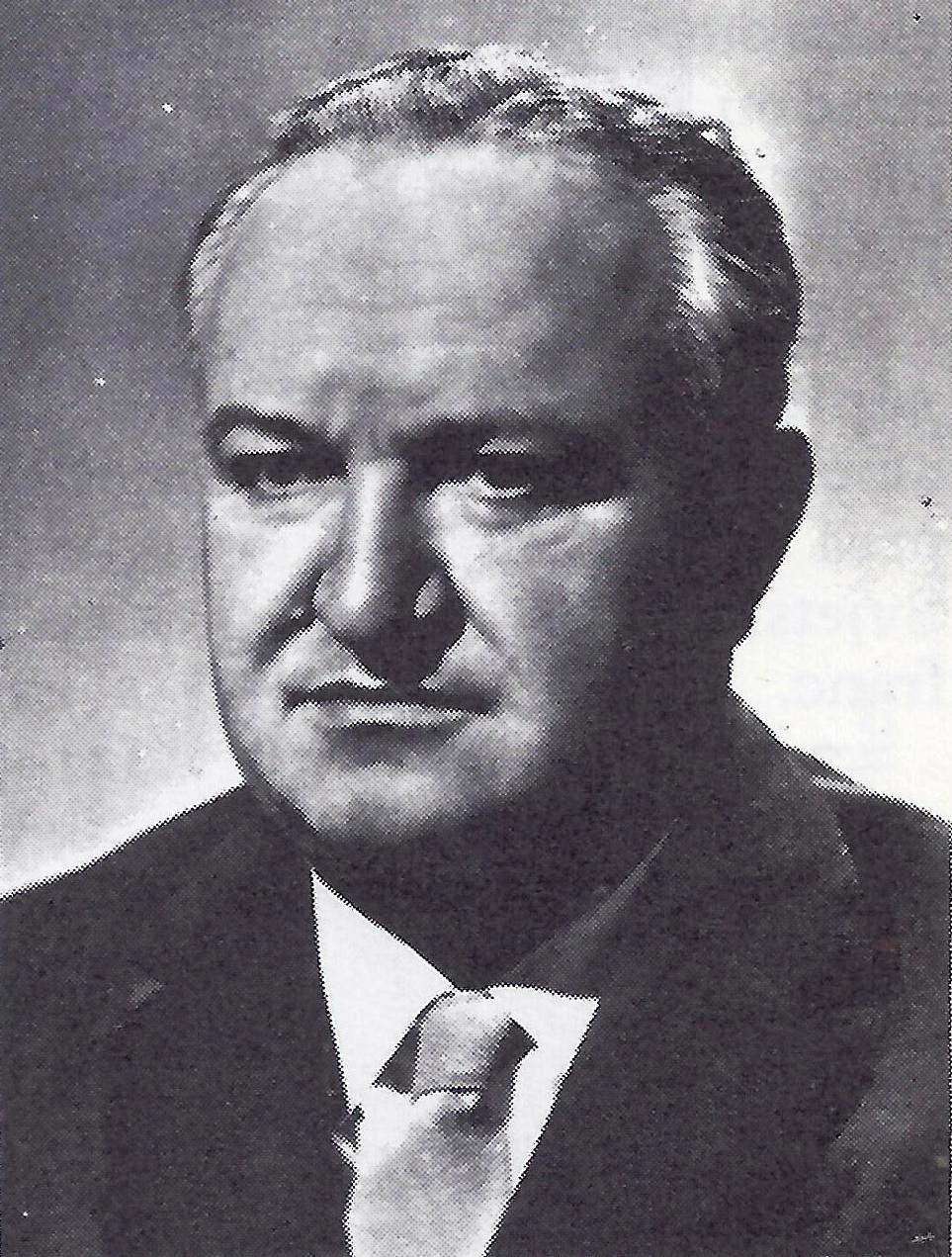
  Vladimir Bakarić
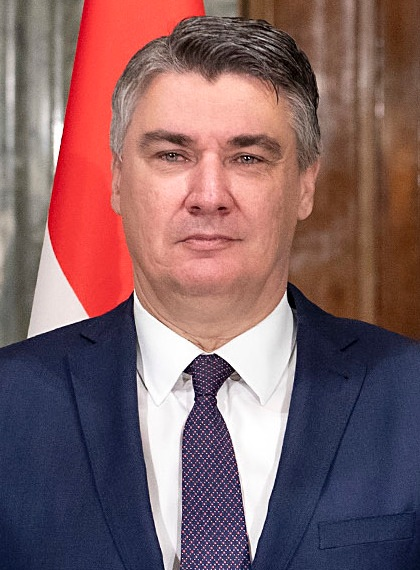
  Zoran Milanović
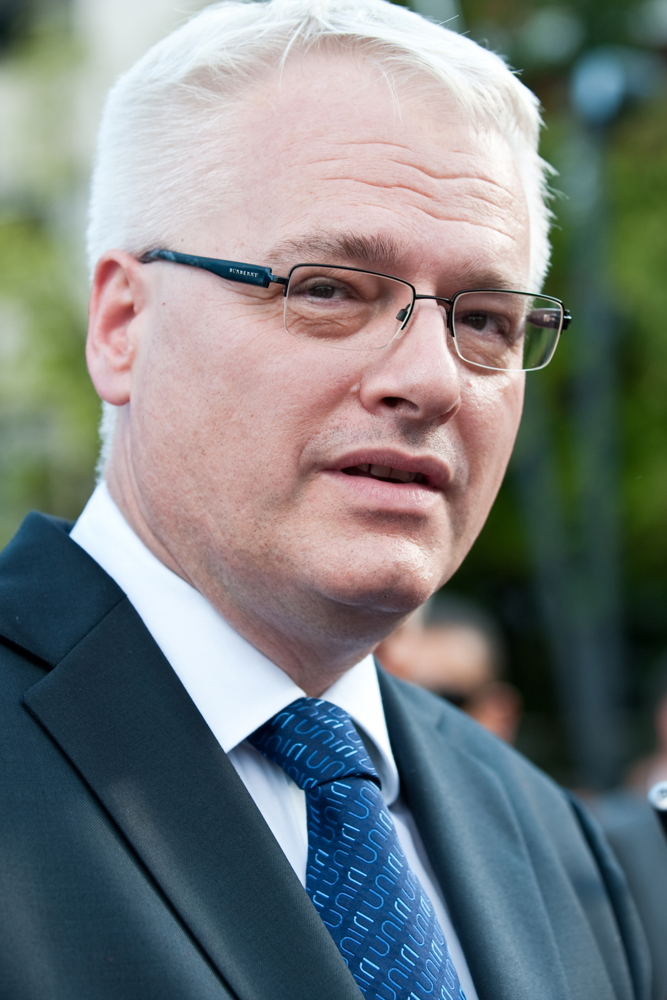
  Ivo Josipović
