= Drežnik =

Drežnik may refer to:

- Drežnik, Serbia, a village near Užice
- Drežnik, Črnomelj, a village in Slovenia
- Drežnik, Kostel, a village in Slovenia
- Drežnik Viaduct, a viaduct in Karlovac, Croatia
- Drežnik, Brod-Posavina County, a village near Rešetari, Croatia
- Drežnik Grad, a village in Croatia
- Drežnik Brezovički, a village near Zagreb, Croatia
- Drežnik Podokićki, a village near Samobor, Croatia
- Drežnik Castle, a fortified structure in Croatia
