= Sadilovac =

- Village
- Sadilovac
- Location Of Sadilovac in Croatia
- Coordinates: 44°56′24″N 15°43′05″E
- Country: Croatia
- Region: Continental Croatia
- County: Karlovac
- Municipality: Rakovica

Area
  - Total: 12.1 km^{2} (4.7 sq mi)
- Elevation: 380 m (1,250 ft)

Population (2021)
  - Total: 1
  - Density: 0.083/km^{2} (0.21/sq mi)
- Time zone: UTC+1 (CET)
  - Summer (DST): UTC+2 (CEST)
- Postal code: 47246 Drežnik Grad
- Area code: (+385) 47

Sadilovac is an uninhabited settlement in the Kordun region of Croatia, in the municipality of Rakovica, Karlovac County.

== History ==
The village of Sadilovac was established in the 18th century as evidenced by the arrangement of houses along the road and the church situated at the entrance of the settlement.

== WWII ==
Large-scale massacres against the Serb population took place during the WWII Genocide by the Croatian fascist Ustaše regime. About 60% of Sadilovac residents lost their lives during the war.

In 1941, Stipe Bičanić was designated as its Ustaša zbirnik.

With the withdrawal of the Italians, the chances of a successful Serb rebellion increased. Shortly after the Drvar uprising, Božidar Cerovski, director of the Directorate of the Ustaša Police, arrived in Slunj, on the evening of 29 July 1941, along with an undetermined number of Ustaše from Zagreb for the removal of "undesirable elements". In the morning of the 30th, they broke up into several groups and walked through Serb inhabitted settlements with lists of such individuals, including in Sadilovac, detaining them and transporting them to Oštarski Stanovi, where they were executed on the order of Cerovski.

On 28–30 June 1942 around Sadilovac and Dubrave, a battle took place between a group of about 1000 Partisans and 110 Croatian Domobrani, in which about 150 Partisans died and 80 were wounded, while only 1 Domobran was killed.

== Culture ==
Orthodox church, built in 1826, was burnt down by Ustaše on 31 July 1942. The reconstruction of the church, which only started in 1989 and included reconstruction of the roof and installation of two new bells, has never been fully completed due to the 1991-1995 war.

The memorial plaque with the names of 463 civilian victims of the Sadilovac massacre of 1942, engraved in stone, is kept inside the church. The remains of the victims are buried next to the church.

The Sadilovac Orthodox Parish, which belongs to the Eparchy of Gornji Karlovac, includes the villages of Drežnik, Smoljanac (Lika), Grabovac, Lipovača, Sadilovac, Irinovac (Lika), Vaganac (Lika) i Korana.

== Demographics ==
According to the 2001 and 2011 censuses, the village of Sadilovac has no inhabitants. The village ceased to exist in August 1995, in the course of the Croatian military operation Storm, aimed at recapturing the territory held by the rebel, ethnic Serb residents.

The 1991 census recorded that 81.71% of the village population were ethnic Serbs (67/82), 10.98% were ethnic Croats (9/82), 3.65% were Yugoslavs (3/82) and 3.65% were of other ethnic origin (3/82).

Historical population 1857-2011
v

population	744	946	822	746	770	602	560	636	169	191	183	145	114	82
	1857	1869	1880	1890	1900	1910	1921	1931	1948	1953	1961	1971	1981	1991	2001	2011

Sources: Croatian Bureau of Statistics publications

== Notable natives and residents ==
- Čedo Rajačić (16 April 1904 — 1 February 1985) - lawyer and university professor at Faculty of Law, University of Zagreb
- Nikola Radmanović (1869 — 2 August 1941) - priest of the Serbian Orthodox church

== See also ==
- Sadilovac massacre in World War II, 31 July 1942 in which 463 Orthodox residents from Sadilovac and neighbouring villages lost their lives at hands of Ustaše.

== Bibliography ==
- Trgo, Fabijan, ed. (1964). Zbornik dokumenata i podataka o Narodno-oslobodilačkom ratu Jugoslovenskih naroda. Vol. V, 32.
