= Rakovica, Croatia =

Rakovica
- Municipality
- Municipality of Rakovica; Općina Rakovica
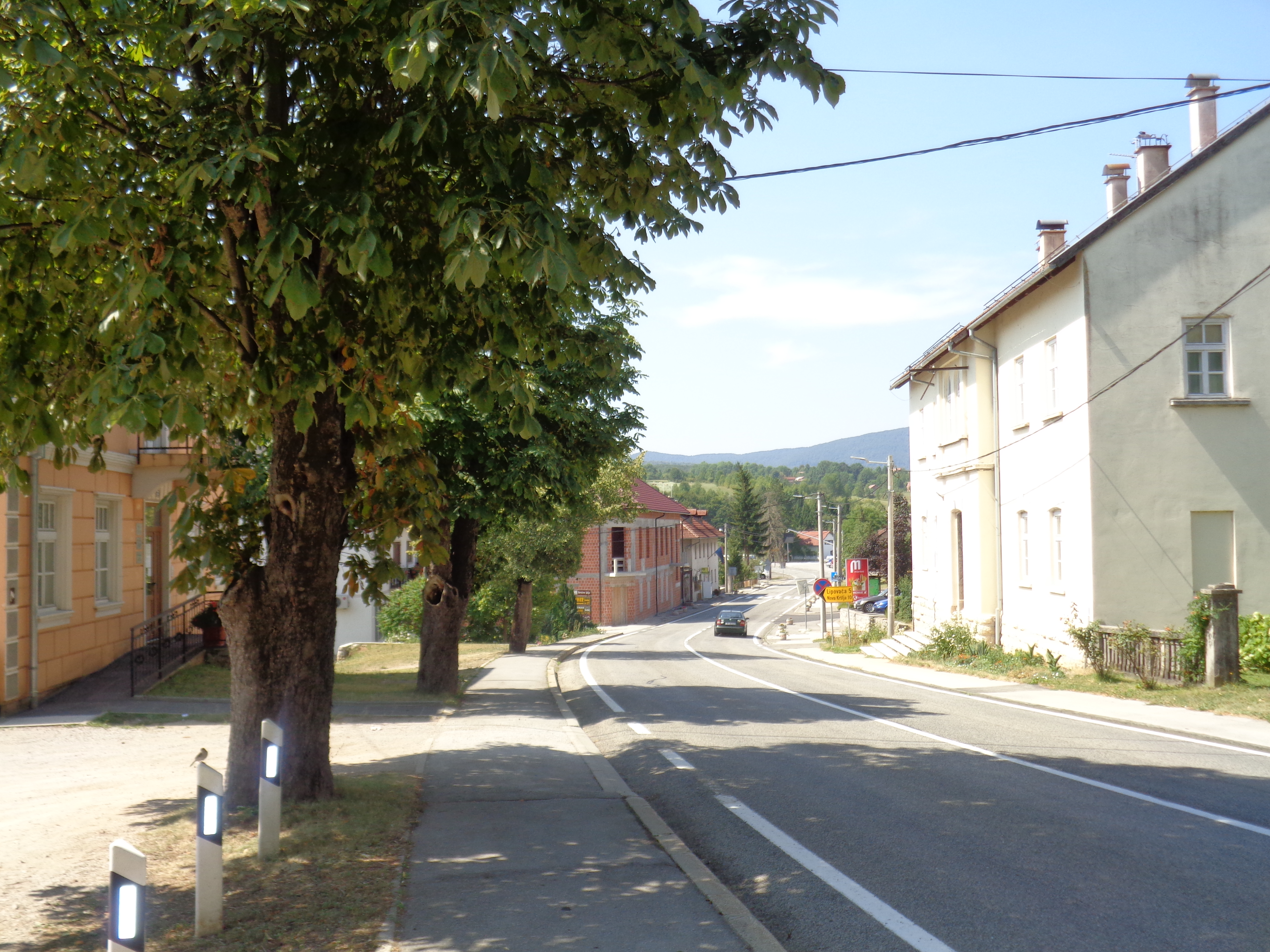
- Rakovica centre
- Interactive map of Rakovica
- Location within Croatia
- Coordinates: 45°01′N 15°39′E
- Country: Croatia
- Region: Central Croatia
- County: Karlovac County

Area
  - Municipality: 256.4 km^{2} (99.0 sq mi)
  - Urban: 2.1 km^{2} (0.81 sq mi)
- Elevation: 350 m (1,150 ft)

Population (2021)
  - Municipality: 2,230
  - Density: 8.70/km^{2} (22.5/sq mi)
  - Urban: 247
  - Urban density: 120/km^{2} (300/sq mi)
- Time zone: UTC+1 (CET)
  - Summer (DST): UTC+2 (CEST)
- Postal codes: 47245
- Area code: (+385) 47
- Website: rakovica.hr

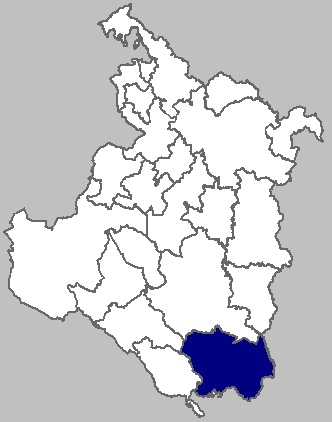
Image of Rakovica municipality within Karlovac County

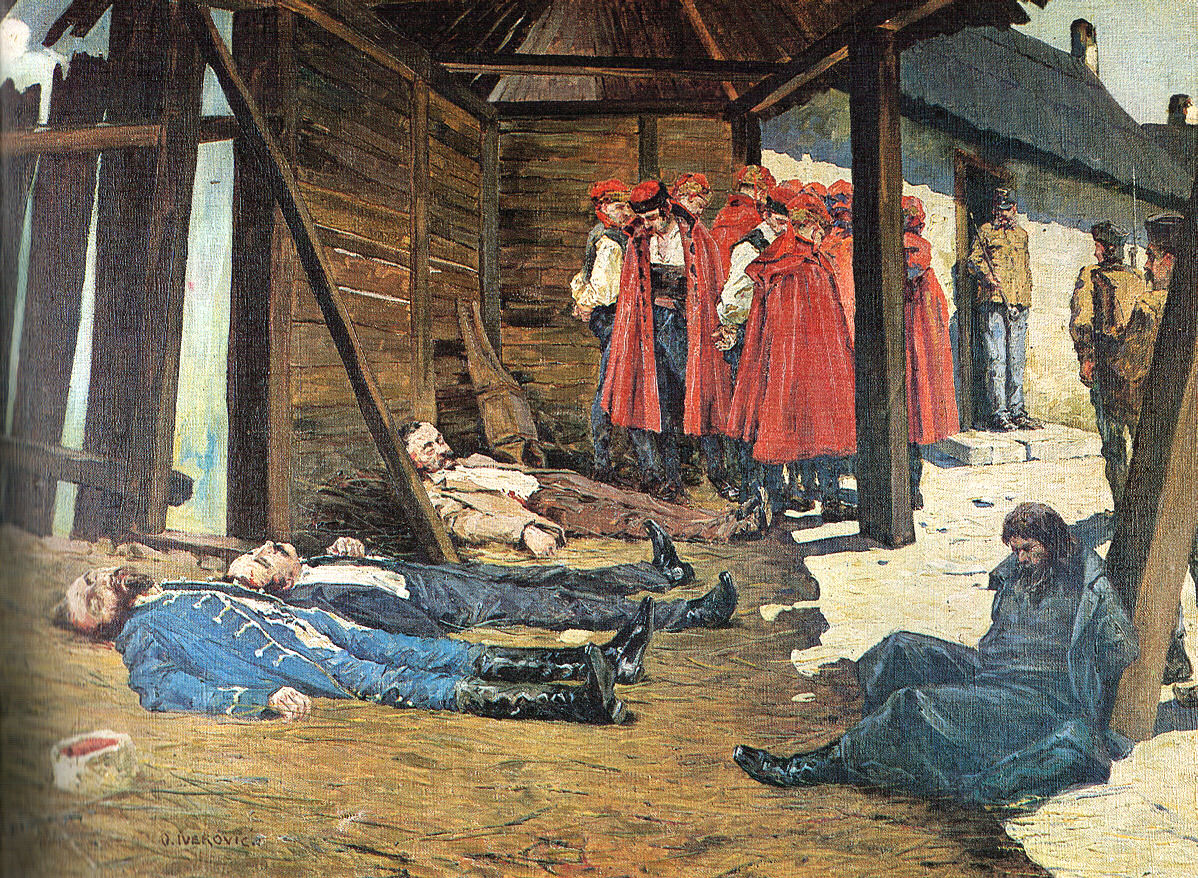
Killings of Rakovica. Death of Eugen Kvaternik.

Rakovica is a village and a municipality in south-central Croatia, in the region of Kordun south of Karlovac and Slunj, and north of the Plitvice Lakes. Rakovica is an underdeveloped municipality which is statistically classified as the First Category Area of Special State Concern by the Government of Croatia.

== History ==
Rakovica achieved some prominence in Croatian history in October 1871, when several members of the Party of Rights led by Eugen Kvaternik disavowed the official party position advocating a political solution to the issue of Croatia within the Habsburg monarchy and instead launched a revolt in the village.

=== WWII ===
==== 1941 ====
On 11 April 1941, a Luftwaffe plane mistakenly dropped four bombs on Rakovica, killing one woman.

Subsequently, the mayor Rade Klarić resigned of his own volition, and was replaced with the notary of the općina, Franjo Rajković, at first informally then formally, with Klarić conducting the handover of duties on 3 May 1941, on which day Rajković was replaced by the NDH administration of Slunj with Ivan Rupčić as mayor. Rajković continued to work in the općina administration as a notary. Klarić continued to live on his property in Kordunski Ljeskovac.

At the meeting of HSS members on 21 June 1941, presided over by tabornik Juretić, Franjo Rajković was accused of protecting public servants of Serbian nationality, who continued to work in the administration, contrary to the decision of the Ustaša headquarters in Slunj to deprive Serbs of free movement. For example, the politically passive Branko Đurić, who sought to Convert to Catholicism as a solution, continued to work there until removed and retired by the Ustaša tabornik. Rajković had also intervened to allow the release of Serbs held prisoner for possessing arms at the arms depot in Nova Kršlja. At the meeting, the representative of the Bihać police, Kruno Batušić, proposed Rajković be made the kotarski predstojnik of one of the neighbouring kotars with a Serb majority (Korenica, Udbina, Donji Lapac), an offer which Rajković rejected.

By the second half of June, not a single Serbian Orthodox priest remained on the territory of Drežnik Grad, having obtained permission to leave for the GMS, and so the president of the kotar Eduard Lenčerić confiscated all parish registries.

The Royal Italian Army occupied Rakovica in May 1941, during the events of the Blagaj massacre and in preparation for gaining a better negotiating position in the upcoming delineation of their border with the NDH, which came on the 18th with the Treaties of Rome on the 18th. The Italian Army remained in Rakovica even after Slunj was abandoned on 7 June 1941. They had 150 soldiers, 10 officers, 300 cavalrymen and 30 automobiles and trucks. The Italian Army left Rakovica and Drežnik Grad for Ogulin where the NDH had set up the administrative capital of the new županija of Modruš, on 12 July 1941.

With the withdrawal of the Italians, the chances of a successful Serb rebellion increased. Shortly after the Drvar uprising, Božidar Cerovski, director of the Directorate of the Ustaša Police, arrived in Slunj, on the evening of 29 July 1941, along with an undetermined number of Ustaše from Zagreb for the removal of "undesirable elements". In the morning of the 30th, they broke up into several groups and walked through Serb inhabitted settlements with lists of such individuals, including in Rakovica, detaining them and transporting them to Oštarski Stanovi, where they were executed on the order of Cerovski.

==== 1942 ====
On 1 July 1942, Partisans attacked Rakovica and the Domobran garrison in Oštarski Stanovi, killing 1 and wounding 2; several Partisans were killed and wounded.

== Demographics ==
The total municipality population is 2,387 (2011), while the village itself has 310 residents. According to that census, 94.8% (2,262) are Croats and 3.2% (77) are ethnic Serbs.

In 1890, there were 1302 houses, with a population of 9194 (the largest in the županija).

=== Settlements ===
According to the 2011 census, the municipality or Rakovica consists of the following settlements:

- Basara, population 4
- Brajdić Selo, population 79
- Brezovac, population 8
- Broćanac, population 25
- Čatrnja, population 228
- Ćuić Brdo, population 1
- Drage, population 17
- Drežnik Grad, population 323
- Gornja Močila, population 4
- Grabovac, population 338
- Irinovac, population 137
- Jamarje, population 0
- Jelov Klanac, population 79
- Koranski Lug, population 0
- Kordunski Ljeskovac, population 9
- Korita, population 46
- Lipovac, population 15
- Lipovača, population 133
- Mašvina, population 5
- Nova Kršlja, population 70
- Oštarski Stanovi, population 132
- Rakovica, population 246
- Rakovičko Selište, population 88
- Sadilovac, population 1
- Selište Drežničko, population 290
- Stara Kršlja, population 6

In 1895, Rakovica's 12 villages and 19 hamlets were divided for taxation purposes into 5 tax municipalities (Croatian: porezne obćine), under the Slunj office.

== Economy ==
In 1895, Rakovica's 12 villages and 19 hamlets were divided for taxation purposes into 5 tax municipalities (Croatian: porezne obćine). Rakovica itself was under the Slunj taxation office, in turn under the Ogulin financial board.

== Governance ==
In 1895, the municipality (Croatian: obćina) of Rakovica, with an area of 193 square kilometres (75 mi^{2}), belonged to the kotar and electoral district in the županija of Modruš-Rieka.

== Sights ==
Due to proximity of Plitvice Lakes, one of the main fields of income is tourism. One of its sights are the Caves of Barać which were reopened for visitors in 2004.

== Infrastructure ==
In 1895, there was a local court (Croatian: mjestni sud) at Rakovica, belonging to the Slunj court, itself under the Ogulin court.

In 1913, there were 7 gendarmeries in Slunj kotar: Cetin-grad, Gornja Močila, Nova Kršlja, Primišlje, Rakovica, Slunj and Veljun.

== Selected works ==
=== History ===
- Prša, Želimir (2022-05-15). "Općine Rakovica i Drežnik Grad u Drugom svjetskom ratu (1941.- 1945.)". Podplješivički graničari. pp. 51–90. ISSN 2459-9395.
- Kruhek, Milan, ed. (2003). Rakovica, srce od Hrvata: Povijest općine Rakovice. ISBN 953-6648-09-1.

== See also ==
- Rakovica Revolt
- Caves of Barać

== Bibliography ==
=== History ===
- Trgo, Fabijan, ed. (1964). Zbornik dokumenata i podataka o Narodno-oslobodilačkom ratu Jugoslovenskih naroda. Vol. V, 32.
- Fras, Franz Julius (1835). "Rakoviczer-Kompagnie" [Rakovica Company]. Vollständige Topographie der Karlstädter-Militärgrenze mit besonderer Rücksicht auf die Beschreibung der Schlösser, Ruinen, Inscriptionen und andern dergleichen Ueberbleibseln von Antiquitäten: nach Anschauung und aus den zuverlässigsten Quellen dargestellt für reisende, und zur Förderung der Vaterlandsliebe (in German). Zagreb: Franz Suppan. pp. 313–316.
