= Rakovica revolt =

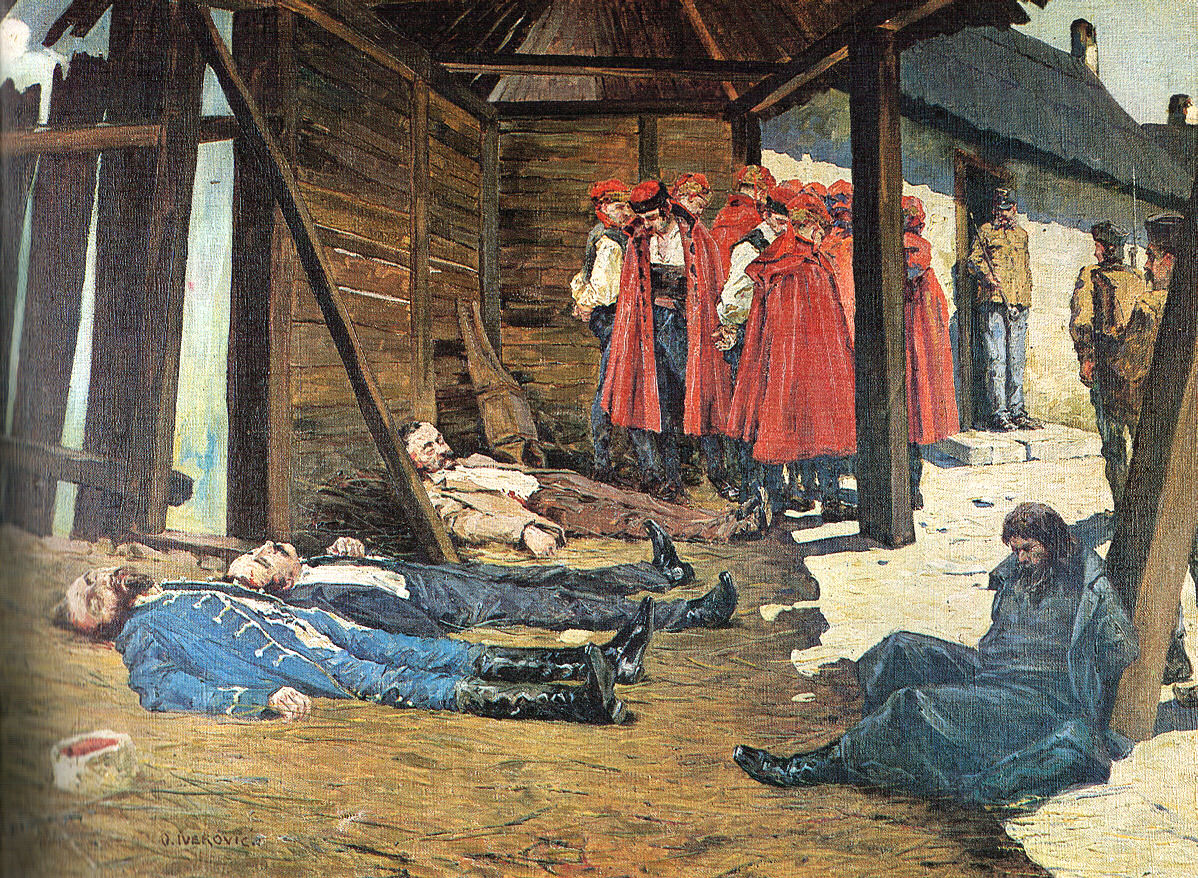
- Rakovica Deaths by Oton Iveković
- Date: 8–11 October 1871
- Location: Rakovica, Croatia-Slavonia, Austria-Hungary (present-day Croatia)
- Outcome: Withdrawal of idea of Austrian-Hungarian federalization; Fall of Hohenwart's Government
- Deaths: Eugen Kvaternik

The Rakovica revolt (Croatian: Rakovička buna) was an armed uprising in 1871, led by Croatian politician Eugen Kvaternik against the authorities of Austria-Hungary, with the aim of establishing an independent Croatian state. The uprising, named after the village of Rakovica in south-central Croatia where it started, lasted only four days and ended in defeat.

== Revolt ==
=== Preparations ===
Eugen Kvaternik had planned to launch a rebellion years earlier against what was then the Austrian Empire. However, he failed to secure allies in either Italy or Hungary to participate in the cause.

Kvaternik organized the revolt without notifying anybody from Party of Rights, including its leader Ante Starčević. Kvaternik hoped to create an independent Croatian state, a union of the Croatian Military Frontier with the provincial Croatia, and their joint secession from Austria-Hungary. He even issued a seal of a new Croatian state. However, following the Croatian-Hungarian Agreement, the population at the Croatian Military Frontier did not support an unification with the Kingdom of Croatia as the kingdom was under strong Hungarian influence, while the Frontiers supported the ruling Austrian royal family. This made conditions for the revolt much more challenging than Kvaternik had expected.

Another difficulty was selecting the best location to trigger the revolution. Finally, a decision was made to do so at the village of Rakovica and the area of Kordun. This area was mostly populated by Orthodox Serbs of Croatia who supported Kvaternik.

=== Conflict ===
Kvaternik gathered rebels in the village of Broćanac on 7 October, 1871. He proclaimed the establishment of the Croatian People's Government and the rebels appointed him president. Soon, he gained support from the villages of Rakovica, Broćanac, Brezovac, Mašvina, Plavča Draga, and Gornja Močila. Kvaternik's government declared all citizens would be treated equally before the law, municipalities would be allowed governing themselves, the military administration in the Croatian Military Frontier would be abolished, and free counties introduced. In order to get to the border with Bosnia Vilayet, which was part of the Ottoman Empire at the time, the rebels concluded they needed to capture the village of Drežnik. One of the rebellion leaders, Antun Rakijaš, advanced with 300 men towards Drežnik, but the local population refused to join the movement and Rakijaš and his men returned to Rakovica.

On 9 October, Kvaternik led the attack on Plaški and the Austro-Hungarian Army responded by sending their Ogulin Regiment to deal with the rebels. The majority of Kvaternik's 1,700 rebels fled and by 10 October, Kvaternik's rebellion was crushed. He was executed the following day, along with Bach, Rakijaš, and one of the Čuić brothers (the other one took refuge in Serbia).

== Aftermath ==
Immediately after rebellion, on 10 October, the Austrian government began arresting remaining leaders. On November 11, the court sentenced seven participants to hanging, including Janko Čuić, Petar Čuić, Marko Milošević, Jozo Stregar, Ilija Šaša, Petar Tepavac, and Petar Ugarković. As no executioners were available on that day, the convicts were shot instead.

On 14 October, Lazo Čuić, Petar Došen, Filip Milanović, and Miladin Šaša were sentenced to death. Mladin Šaša's conviction was later changed to an 18-year prison sentence.

During the early morning of 13 October, all citizens carrying the Starčević surname were arrested. Further arrests included Maksim Ćurić (8-year sentence), Milovan Miljković (14-year sentence), Lazo Šaša (4-year sentence), Franjo Turkalj (14-year sentence), Petar Vrdoljak (12-year sentence), as well as Mihael Bosnić, Stjepan Đaković, Rudolf Fabijani, Mihajlo Majnolović, and Petar Vojnović, all of whom were later released.

On 16 October, Franjo Rački informed Josip Juraj Strossmayer about one of Kvaternik's plans had the revolt been successful - in letters found on Kvaternik's person he had stated his intent to eliminate Ivan Mažuranić (who was the major supporter of friendly relations with Austria at the time), Matija Mrazović, Franjo Rački, Đuro Crnadak and Nikola Krešić.

Before the rebellion, Austria was governed by Karl Sigmund von Hohenwart who had planned to federalize Austria-Hungary into three major parts: Austrian, Hungarian, and South Slavic (Croatian). The Hungarian ruling elites opposed this change and Hungarian Prime Minister Gyula Andrássy demanded Croatian subordination. He had portrayed Croats as staunch opponents of the Franz Joseph's regime and once Kvaternik's rebellion had failed, Andrássy used it as proof of how dangerous the Croatian opposition has become. This led to the fall of Hohenwart's government and abandonment of federalism.

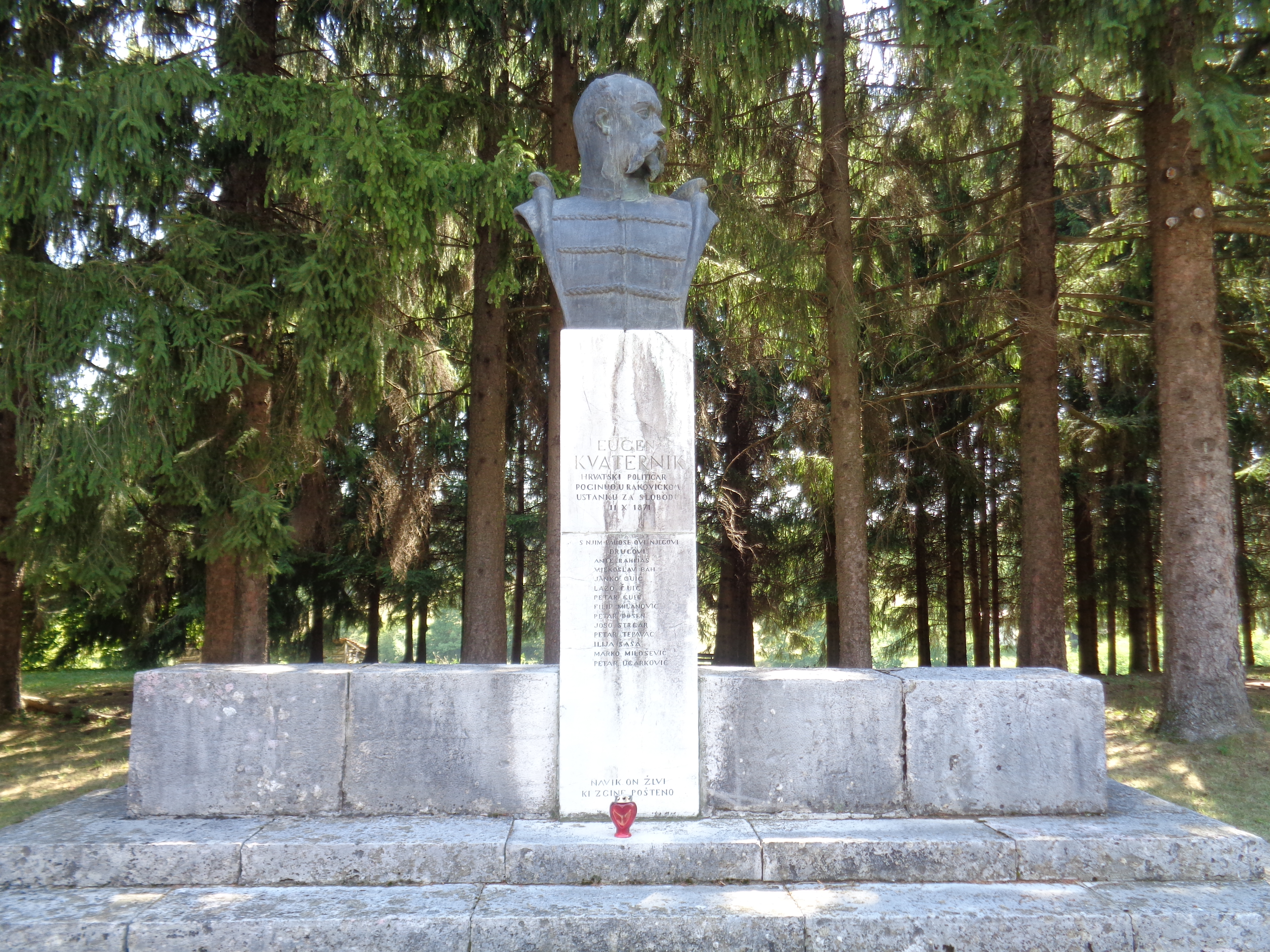
Bust of Eugen Kvaternik in Rakovica

== Monument ==
A statue of Kvaternik was unveiled in Rakovica in 1933. After World War II, it was removed by the communist authorities, but was later returned. The statue was once again removed and damaged by Serbian soldiers during the Croatian War of Independence, but was fully restored in 1996.

== Literature ==
- Horvat, Josip. "Graditelj Mažuranić [Builder Mažuranić]". In Židovec, Zdravko (in Croatian). Politička povijest Hrvatske [Political History of Croatia]. 1. Zagreb: ITRO Augustin Cesarec. ISBN 86-393-0151-4.
- Šišić, Ferdo (1926). Kvaternik (Rakovička buna) (in Croatian). Zagreb: Tisak Hrveatskog Štamparskog Zavoda D.D.
