= Siege of Šturlić =

Siege of Šturlić (1788)
- Part of Austro-Turkish War (1788–1791)
Date	9 February 1788
Location	Šturlić
Result	Ottoman victory

Belligerents
Habsburg monarchy: Kingdom of Croatia	Ottoman Empire

Commanders and leaders
(Habsburg monarchy) Mathias Rukavina von Boynograd (WIA)	Unknown

Strength
Unknown	Unknown

Casualties and losses
141 killed and wounded	Unknown

The siege of Šturlić was a minor engagement during the early stages of the Austro-Turkish War of 1788–1791.

On February 9, 1788, the Habsburg emperor, Joseph II, delivered the declaration of war through his emissary in Constantinople. The very first engagements took place on the same day, Croatian battalions from Lika and Otočac moved on February 9 and headed towards the Bosnian borders and crossed the Korana River. The troops aimed to attack and capture the fortress of Drežnik Grad and Šturlić. Two groups were dispatched to do that. Drežnik was captured on 12 February. The group that was sent to Šturlić was led by Lieutenant Colonel Mathias Rukavina von Boynograd. Šturlić was located on the right bank of the Korana River. The Habsburgs burned down the area surrounding the Šturlić. The Habsburgs then attacked the fortress; the Ottoman garrison offered a stubborn resistance during which Mathias Rukavina was wounded badly and lost 141 killed and wounded. Mathias Rukavina was forced to retreat to the Korana River.

== Sources ==
- John R. Oreskovich (2019), The History of Lika, Croatia, Land of War and Warriors.
- József Bánlaky: Military history of the Hungarian nation (MEK-OSZK), 0014/1149. The campaign of 1788.
- K. und K. Kriegsarchiv (1891), Chronicle of the Austro-Hungarian War: The south-eastern theater of war in the lands of the Hungarian crown, Dalmatia and Bosnia (Germany).
