= Korita =

Korita may refer to several places:

== Bosnia and Herzegovina ==
- Korita, Bileća
- Korita, Bosansko Grahovo
- Korita, Ilijaš
- Korita, Tomislavgrad

== Croatia ==
- Korita, Požega-Slavonia County, a village near Lipik
- Korita, Dubrovnik-Neretva County, a village on Mljet
- Korita, Split-Dalmatia County, a village near Otok
- Korita, Karlovac County, a village near Rakovica

== Montenegro ==
- Korita, Montenegro

== Slovenia ==
- Korita, Idrija
- Korita na Krasu
