= Stara Kršlja =

Stara Kršlja Kršlja
- Village
- Interactive map of Stara Kršlja
- Coordinates: 45.996°N 15.697°E
- Country: Croatia
- County: Karlovac County
- Municipality: Rakovica

Area
  - Total: 2.2 sq mi (5.8 km^{2})

Population (2021)
  - Total: 5
  - Density: 2.2/sq mi (0.86/km^{2})
- Time zone: UTC+1 (CET)
  - Summer (DST): UTC+2 (CEST)
- Postal code: 47240 Slunj
- Area code: +385 (0)47

Stara Kršlja is a village in Croatia.

== History ==
In 1941, Ante Špoljarić was designated as its Ustaša zbirnik.

With the withdrawal of the Italians, the chances of a successful Serb rebellion increased. Shortly after the Drvar uprising, Božidar Cerovski, director of the Directorate of the Ustaša Police, arrived in Slunj, on the evening of 29 July 1941, along with an undetermined number of Ustaše from Zagreb for the removal of "undesirable elements". In the morning of the 30th, they broke up into several groups and walked through Serb inhabitted settlements with lists of such individuals, including in Stara Kršlja, detaining them and transporting them to Oštarski Stanovi, where they were executed on the order of Cerovski.

== Demographics ==
Village of Stara Kršlja: Population trends 1857–2021
v

population	705	796	720	375	381	704	568	632	177	200	213	112			3	7	5
	1857	1869	1880	1890	1900	1910	1921	1931	1948	1953	1961	1971	1981	1991	2001	2011	2021

Note:Separated from Mašvina in 2001, in which its population was counted in 1981 and 1991. Through 1948 it was considered a "dio naselja" and from 1953 on an independent village. Sources: Croatian Bureau of Statistics publications
