= Drežnik Castle =

Castle

- Drežnik Grad village, Rakovica municipality, Karlovac County, Croatia
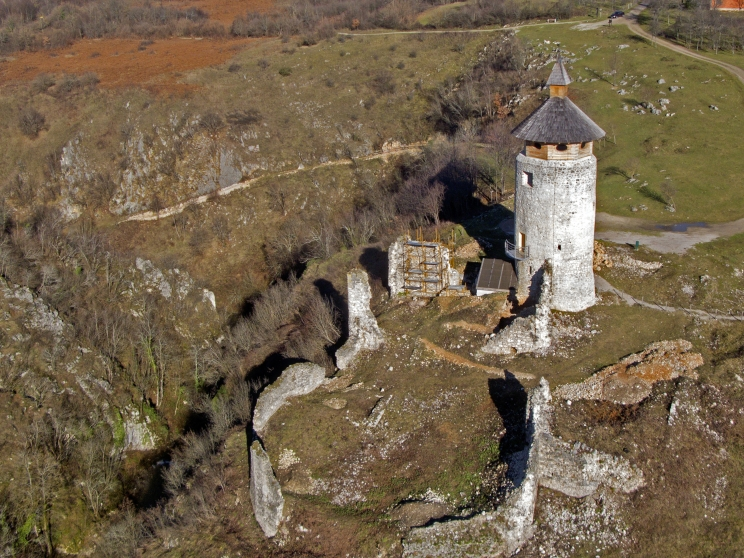
- remains of the castle with newly built tower

Site information
- Type: Hillside castle
- Controlled by: House of Nelipić (from 1253), Güssinger, Babonić (from 1278), princes of Krk /later Frankopans/ (1323-1592), Ottoman Empire (1592-1788); Croatian military frontier (1788-1866); Kingdom of Croatia-Slavonia (1866-1917); Drežnik Municipality (1917 – )
- Condition: ruins

Location
- Location within Croatia
- Coordinates: 44.918°N 15.613°E

Site history
- Built: 12th century (?)
- Materials: stone

Drežnik Castle (pronounced [ˈdɾeːʒnik]; Croatian: Stari grad Drežnik) is a ruined medieval fortified structure in the village of Drežnik Grad, within the Rakovica municipality, Karlovac County, Republic of Croatia. It is located about 10 kilometres (6.2 mi) northeast of the Plitvice Lakes National Park and 130 kilometres (81 mi) from Zagreb, the capital of Croatia.

== History ==
According to historical sources, it was first mentioned in 1185. Over the next few centuries, it was owned by several lords, including members of the House of Nelipić (from 1253),, Güssinger and Babonić (from 1278), and finally from 1321 by the princes of Krk (later Frankopans), specifically their Tržac branch. In the 16th century, like many of Croatian castles and fortresses, Drežnik was under constant threat from the invading Ottoman army. Unable to defend itself against a superior enemy, it fell in 1592 and became Otoman stronghold.

The castle was liberated at the end of the 18th century in a military campaign within the Austro-Turkish War (1788–1791). After a two-day siege and heavy cannon fire by Habsburg military forces between 10 and 12 February 1788, the Turkish crew surrendered to Habsburg troops led by colonel Daniel Peharnik-Hotković. After the liberation, the fortress was used for military purposes.

According to a drawing of the castle from 1830, it was in good condition. It housed the command of the Drežnik company. The castle was under military administration until 1866, when it was sold to a merchant who slowly began to demolish it and to sell building materials to local residents. Eventually it became a ruin. On 17 April 1917 the Croatian Parliament entrusted the care of the castle to the Drežnik Municipality.

== Description ==
Drežnik Castle is situated above the steep canyon of the Korana river, at the part where the river, a few kilometers after its spring at the Plitvice Lakes turns eastward to form today's multi-kilometer border between Croatia and Bosnia and Herzegovina. Located on the left, northern bank of the Korana, Drežnik was an integral part of Kordun, a chain of fortifications (a cordon - hence the name Kordun for the area) for defense against the Ottoman Turks, which included, among others, castles and fortresses like Tržac, Cetingrad, Slunj, Furjan etc.

The castle is irregularly rectangular in shape, with stone walls including two rectangular and one round tower situated on the north side. Until recently, it was almost completely in ruins, but in the meantime the round tower has been restored, completely walled in and open to public. Most of the other ruined parts of the castle still stick out into the air.

== Gallery ==
Floor plan of Drežnik Castle from 1830	Attack on the castle in 1788	Stylized portrait of Daniel Peharnik-Hotković, who led the Habsburg army that liberated Drežnik in 1788

== See also ==
- List of castles in Croatia
- Timeline of Croatian history
- Architecture of Croatia
