= Caves of Barać =

Group of caves in Rakovica, Croatia

Coordinates: 44°59′10.60″N 15°43′44.40″E

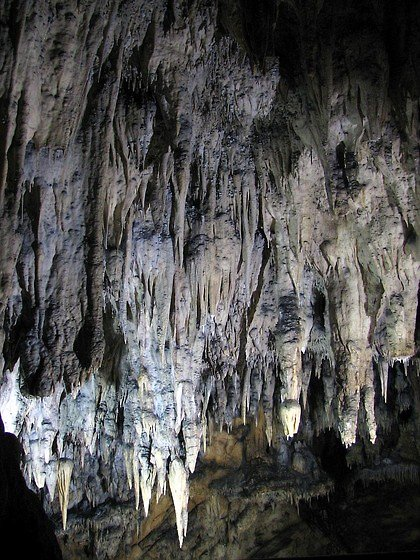
Barac's caves

The Caves of Barać (Croatian: Baraćeve špilje) also known as Barać Caves or Barać's Caves are a group of caves located near the village of Nova Kršlja in the municipality of Rakovica, Croatia. In 1892 the caves were opened to visitors but subsequently abandoned and forgotten following World War II. In July 2004 the Upper Caves of Barać were reopened to visitors.

The caves are named after a certain Barać who was a fighter against the Ottomans. According to a legend the caves bear the name of the victory of Barać at the caves. The surname of Barać does not exist anymore in this region.

In 2022, tools that were likely from the Neanderthals were discovered in the caves, the tool was found next to a phalanx and a tooth of a cave bear.

== See also ==
- List of Dinaric caves
