= Jalzicaphaenops =

Scientific classification
- Kingdom: Animalia
- Phylum: Arthropoda
- Class: Insecta
- Order: Coleoptera
- Suborder: Adephaga
- Family: Carabidae
- Subfamily: Trechinae
- Tribe: Trechini
- Genus: Jalzicaphaenops; Lohai & Lakota, 2010
- Species: J. poljaki

Binomial name
- Jalzicaphaenops poljaki Lohai & Lakota, 2010

Genus of beetles

Jalzicaphaenops is a genus of beetles in the family Carabidae. It contains only one described species, Jalzicaphaenops poljaki, known from a single female holotype collected in the Dumenčića špilja cave near Rakovica in Croatia.
