= Oton Iveković =

Croatian painter (1869–1939)

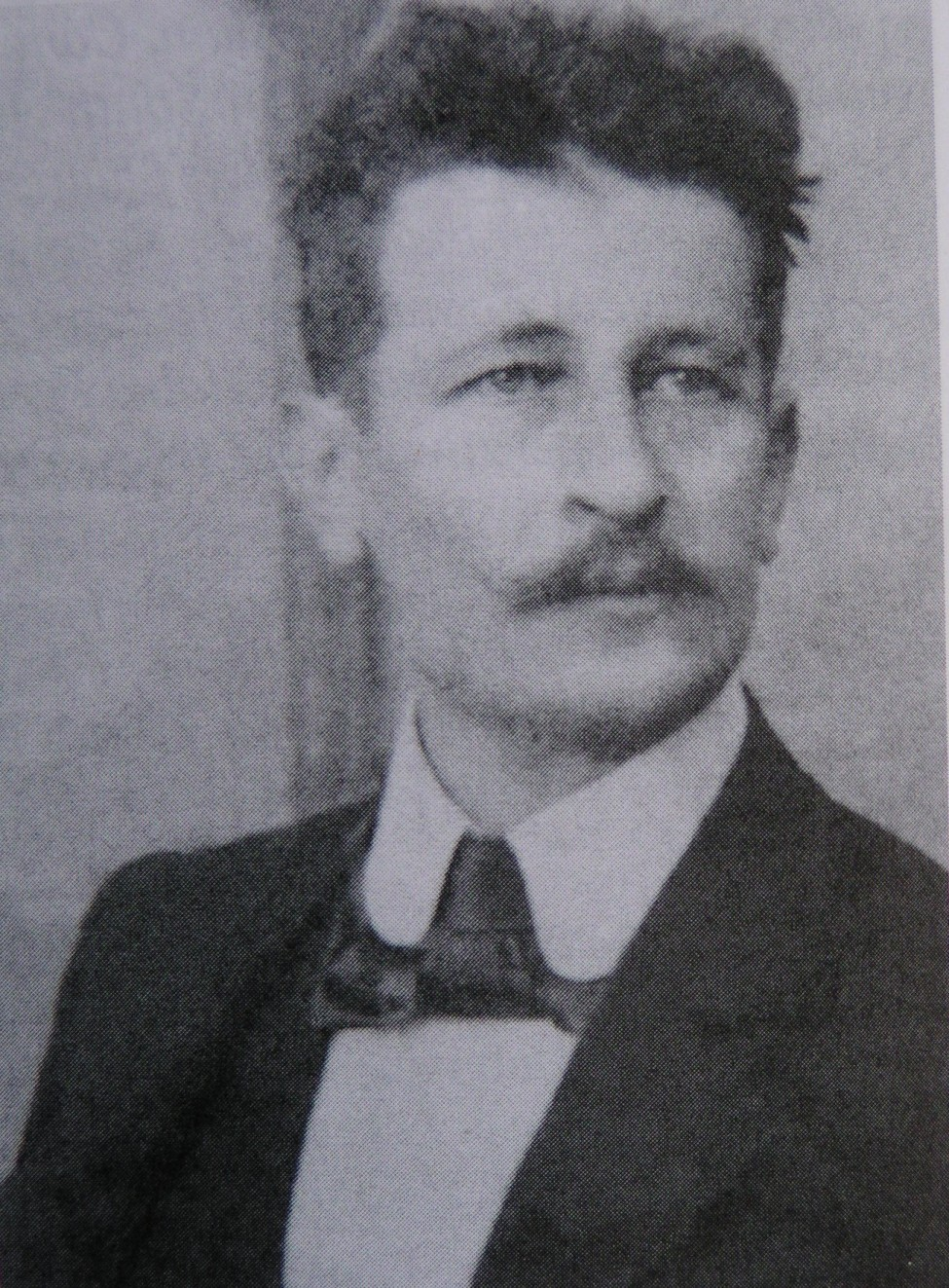
- Born: 17 April 1869; Klanjec, Croatia-Slavonia, Austria-Hungary (now Klanjec, Croatia)
- Died: 4 July 1939 (aged 70); Klanjec, Kingdom of Yugoslavia (now Klanjec, Croatia)
- Known for: Painting

Oton Iveković (Croatian pronunciation: [ǒton iʋěːkoʋit͡ɕ]; 17 April 1869 – 4 July 1939) was a Croatian painter.

A graduate of the Academy of Fine Arts in Vienna, Iveković later taught at the Academy of Fine Arts in Zagreb.

He largely concerned himself with historical topics as well as some religious themes. Many of his paintings remain the chief representations of Croatian history.

== Early life and education ==
Oton Iveković was born on 17 April 1869 in Klanjec, where he finished elementary school. He attended high school for three and a half years in Zagreb where, except for History and Art, he neglected other subjects. When his brother Ćiril went to school in Vienna, he wanted join him and enter the Art Academy, but family couldn't afford it. Instead, he began his studying art in Zagreb with Ferdo Quiquerez, a Croatian painter of French descent. He didn't abandon his plans, however, and earned enough money through the autumn and winter to go to Vienna in the spring.

When he arrived in Vienna he took a summer semester as a guest student. In mid-1888 Iveković became a regular student. Until 1890. he studied with Christian Griepenkerl. After that, he decided to specialize in history painting and studied with Josef Matyáš Trenkwald. At the request of his teacher, he was removed from the summer semester because of frequent arguments with other professors at the Academy. In 1886 he resumed his specialization in history painting, this time with August Eisenmenger. Later, Iveković received a scholarship from the Academy and the Provincial Government in Zagreb. In 1892, with the support of Izidor Kršnjavi, Iveković continued his studies at the Academy of Fine Arts, Munich. Encouraging his history paintings, Kršnjavi recommended Iveković to his friend, Ferdinand Keller at the Academy of Fine Arts, Karlsruhe in 1892.

== Work ==
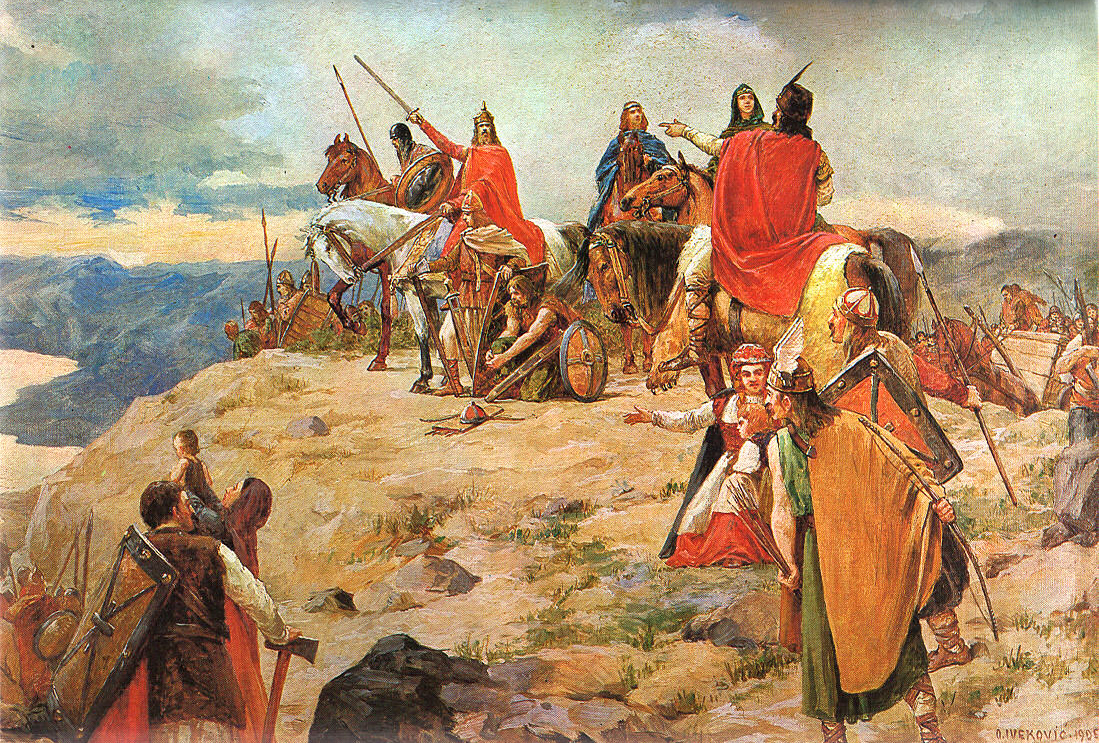
Arrival of Croats to the Adriatic Sea

After completing his specialization, Iveković returned to Croatia where he was immediately appointed professor of painting in a high school. The following year he was a teacher at the School of Crafts, which paid his basic living expenses. Iveković's most productive period lasted from 1894 to 1900, although his intensive activity did not stop even after 1900. At the beginning of the new century, his painting were shown at the World Exhibition in Paris.

In 1901, Iveković and Mato Celestin Medović worked on the illustrations for the epic poem Judita by Marko Marulić. In addition, Iveković illustrated August Šenoa's novel Zlatarevo Zlato (Goldsmiths's Gold), and was an active participant in the Matica hrvatska as a graphic designer. In 1903 he painted the founders of the Matica on a large canvas which may still be seen at the Matica's headquarters in Zagreb. He also worked in theater as a costume and set designer and, in 1904, was involved in the creation of the artistic association "Lada".

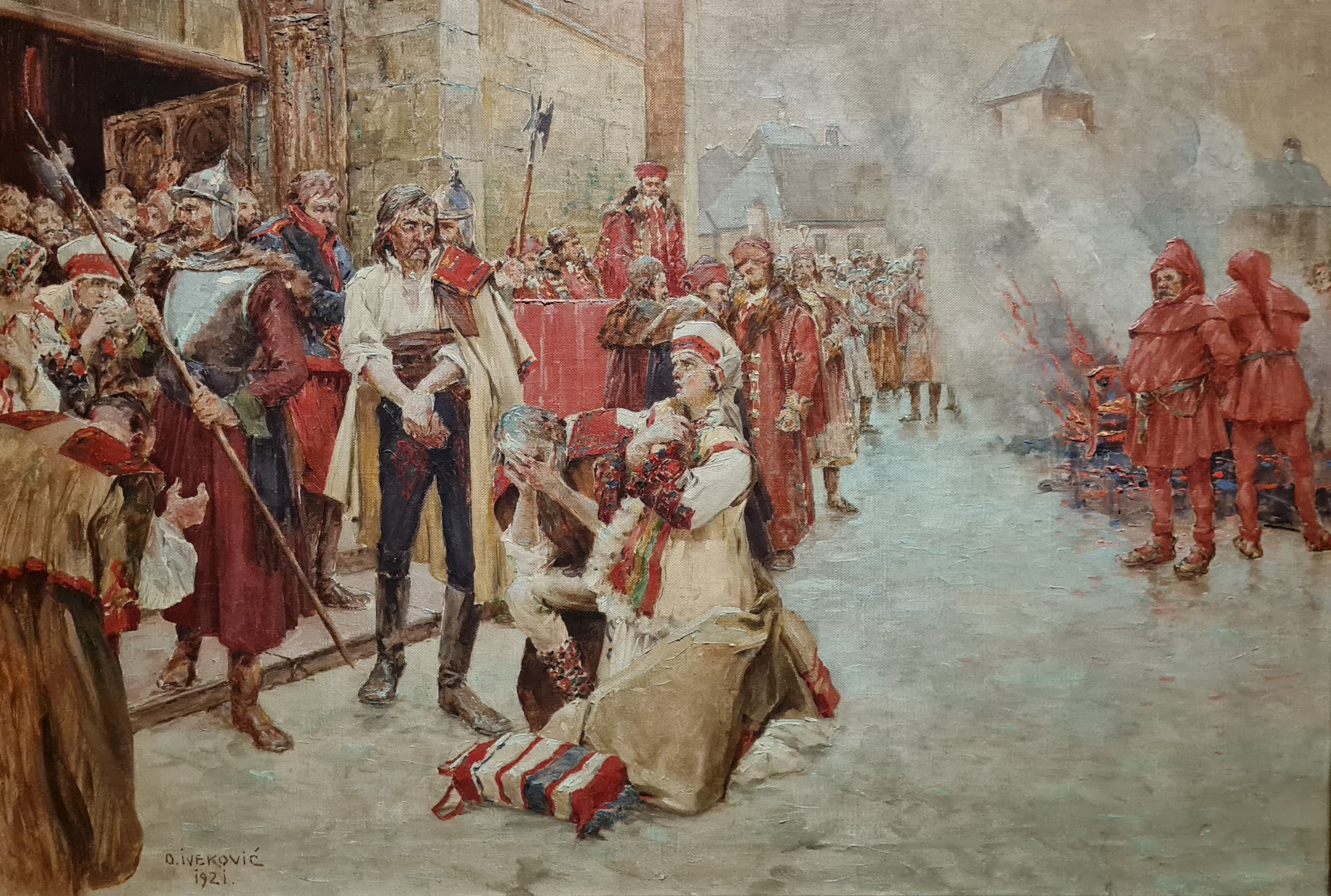
Execution of Matija Gubec

In 1908, the School of Crafts was transformed into an art academy, where Iveković taught drawing and painting until his retirement in 1927. In 1909 he took a sabbatical and traveled to the United States to work on the Croatian parish of St. John the Baptist Roman Catholic Church in Kansas City, where he painted ceilings and walls with fifteen various scenes. Upon completion of the job, he traveled through the American West, recording scenes from the life of cowboys and Indians. He published accounts of his travels in the journal Vienac in 1911. In that same year he withdrew from the Croatian People's Peasant Party, where he had been one of the founding members.

After the outbreak of the First World War, Iveković went to the front as a war correspondent. From June 1915 to September 1918, he was at the battlefields in Sochi, Galicia and Serbia, recording scenes from military life. He entered the service of war propaganda in 1915, after the Royal Land Government in Zagreb employed him to produce the painting Naša pukovnija pred Jajcem ("Our Regiment before Jajce").

== Later years ==
After the war, he sold his house in Jurjevska street in Zagreb and bought the castle of Veliki Tabor. The castle was in very poor condition and required several master craftsmen to do the repair work. The Iveković family lived in Veliki Tabor until 1935, and sold the castle in 1938. Oton spent the last year of his life with his brother Albin in Klanjec.

Iveković died on 4 July 1939 in Klanjec.

== Gallery ==
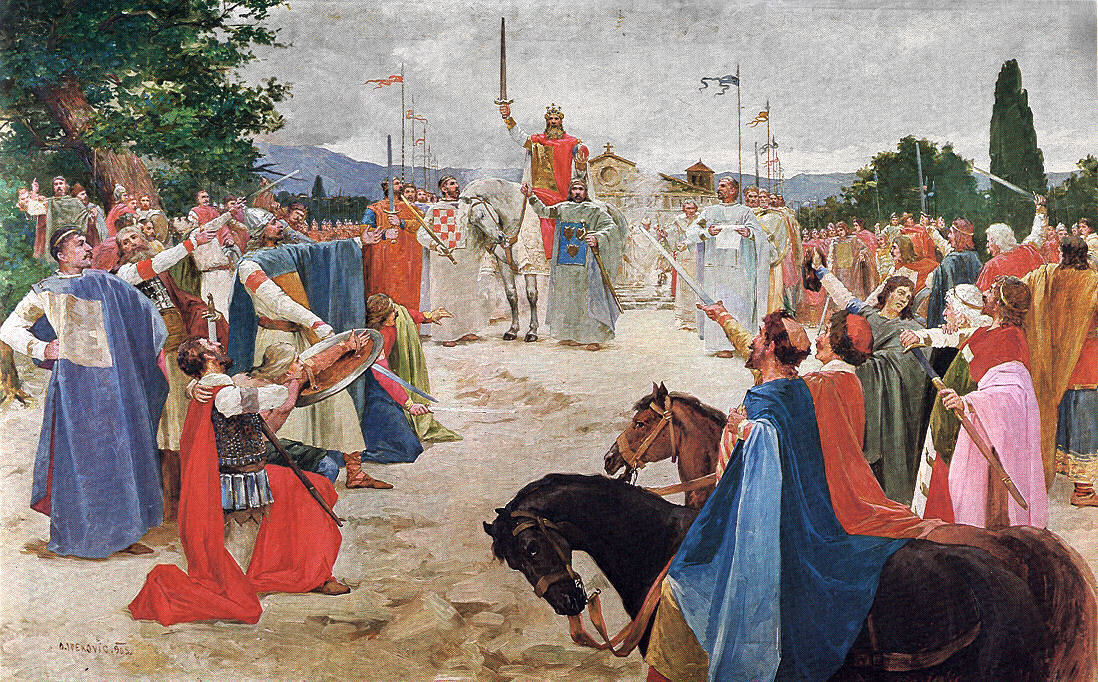
Coronation of King Tomislav

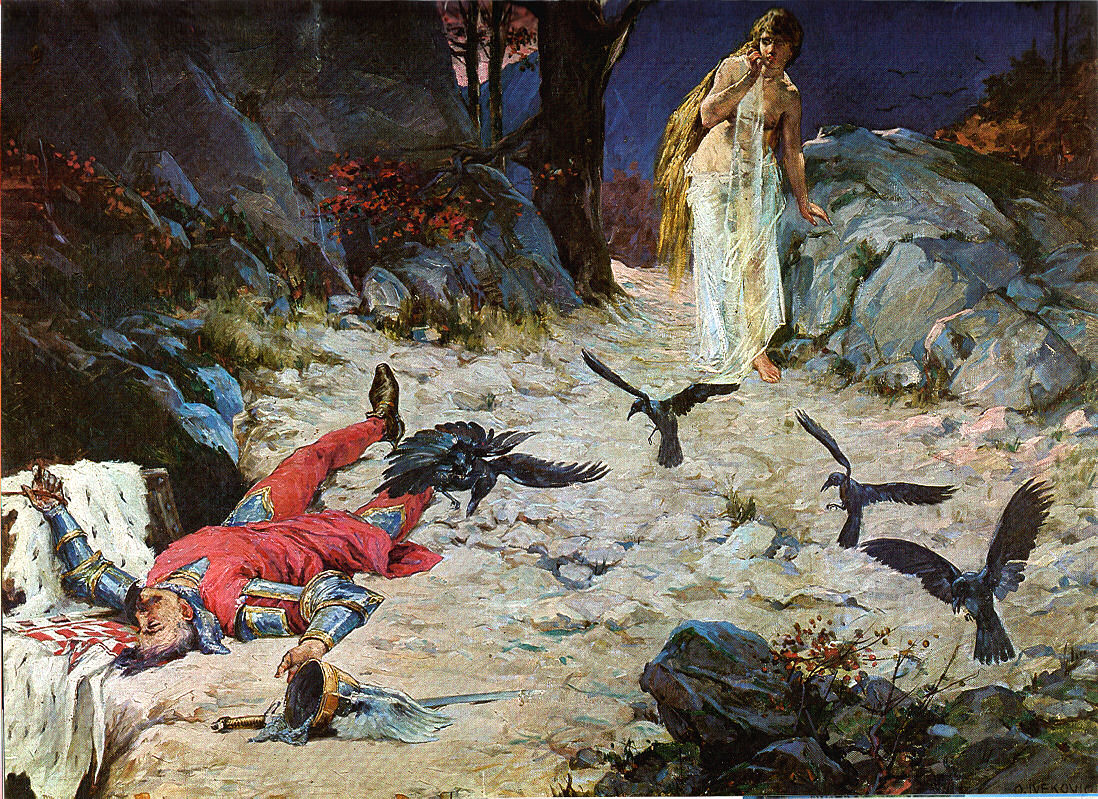
Death of King Petar Svačić

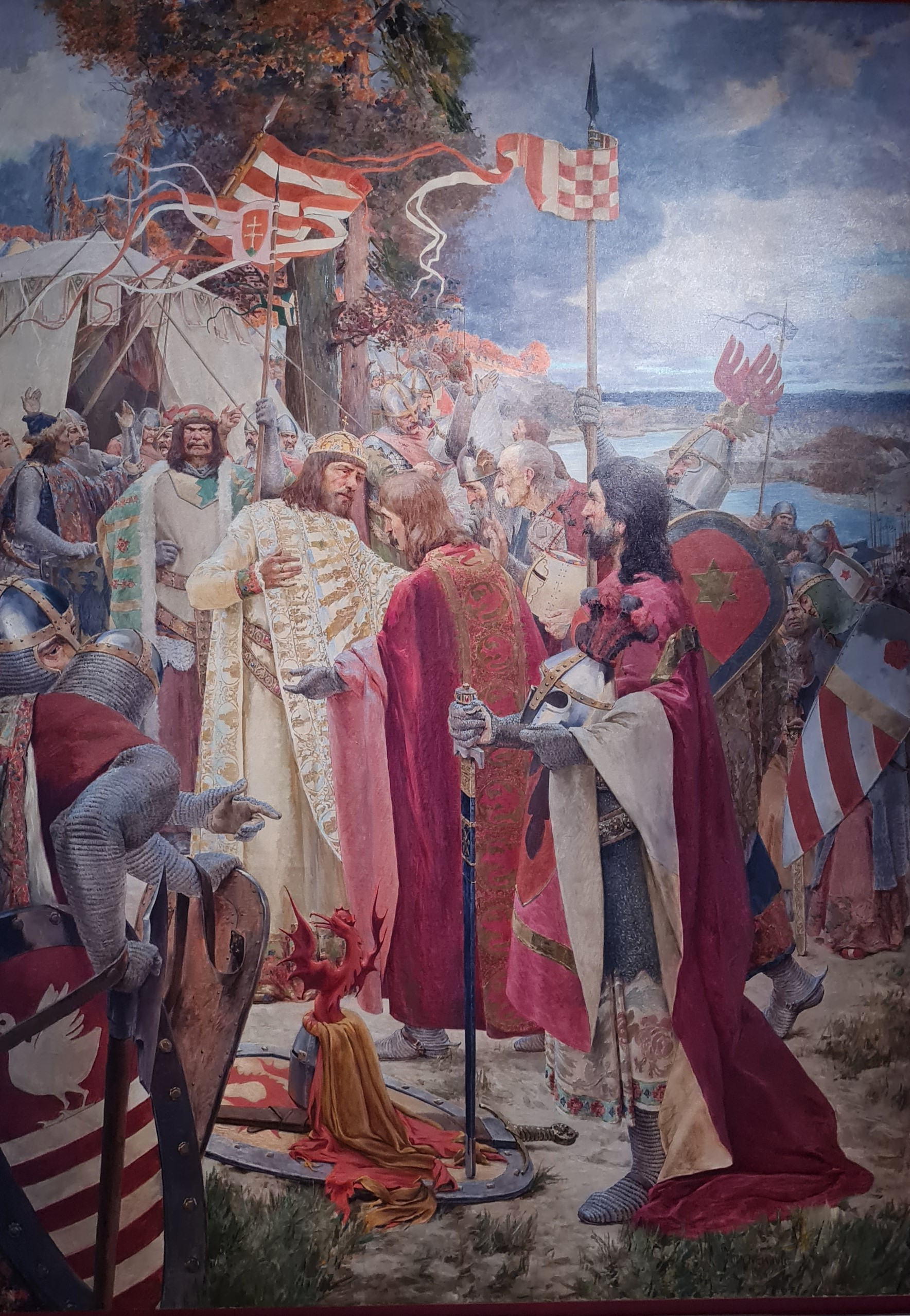
Kiss of Peace between Croatian nobles and King Koloman, 1102

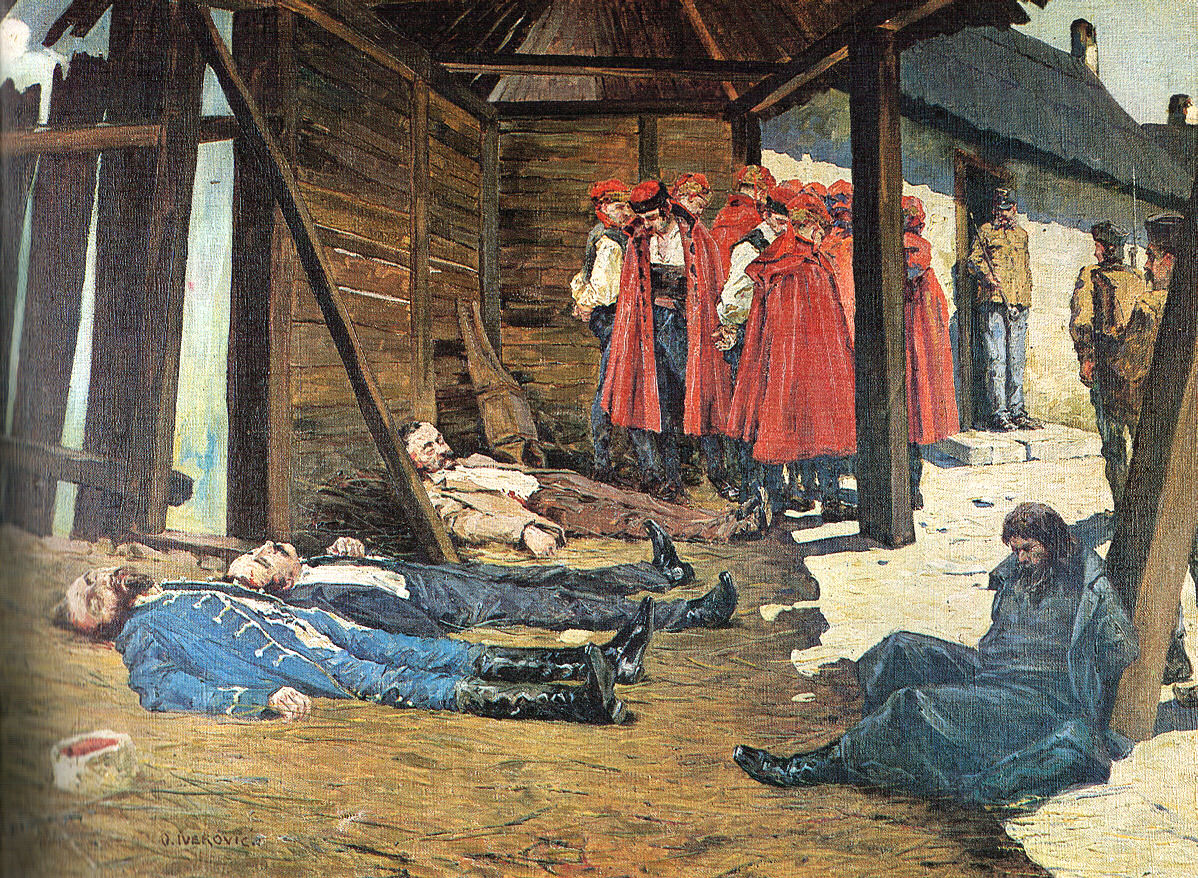
Massacre of Rakovica (Death of Eugen Kvaternik)

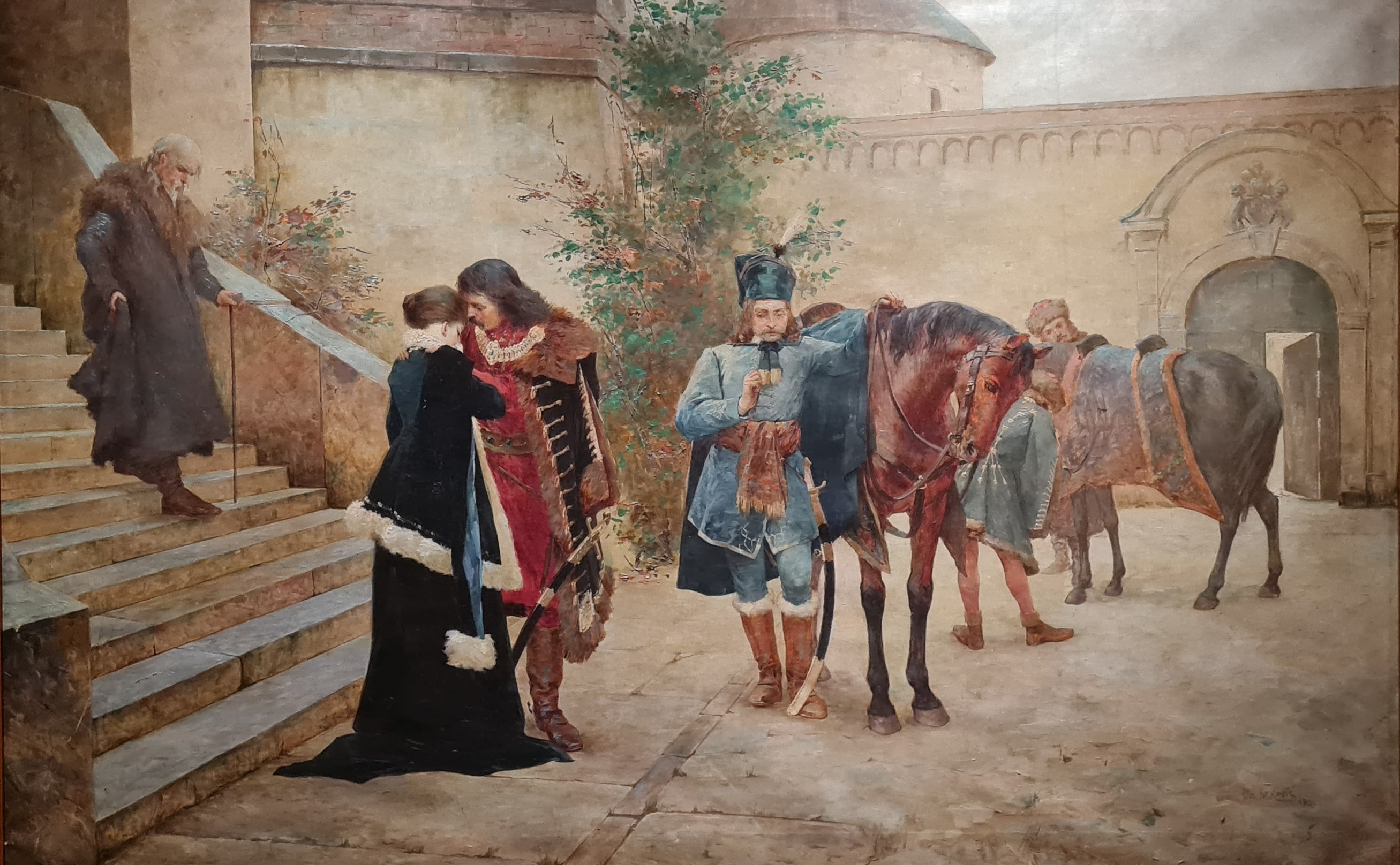
Petar and Katarina Zrinski's final farewell

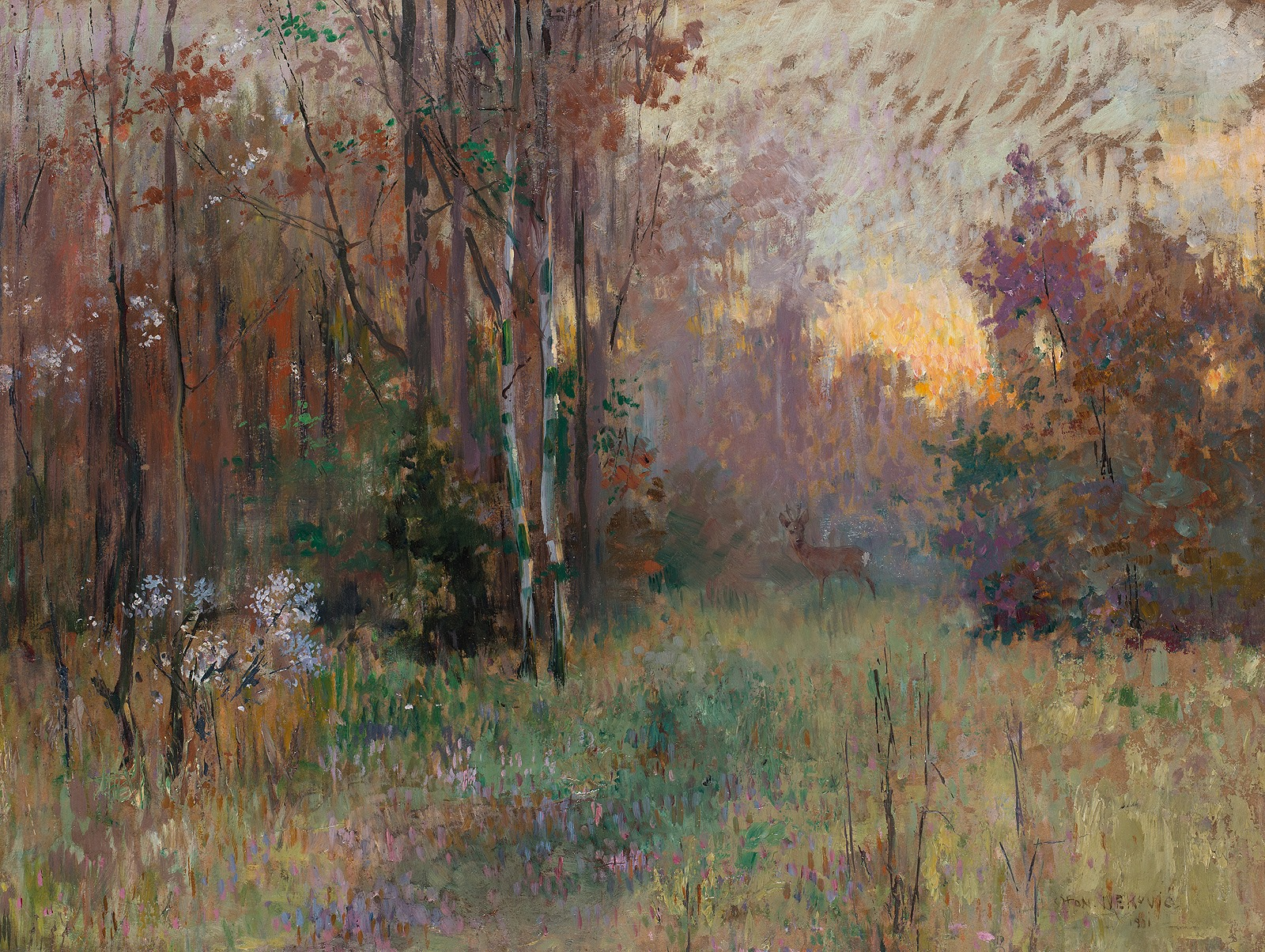
Krajina

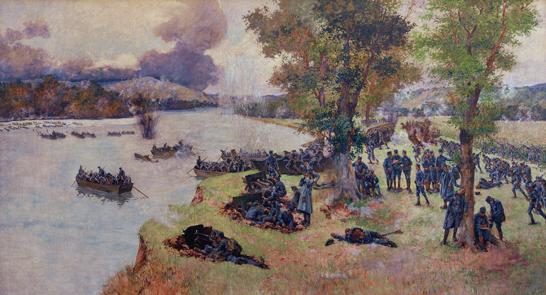
Soldiers cross the Drina River 1914.

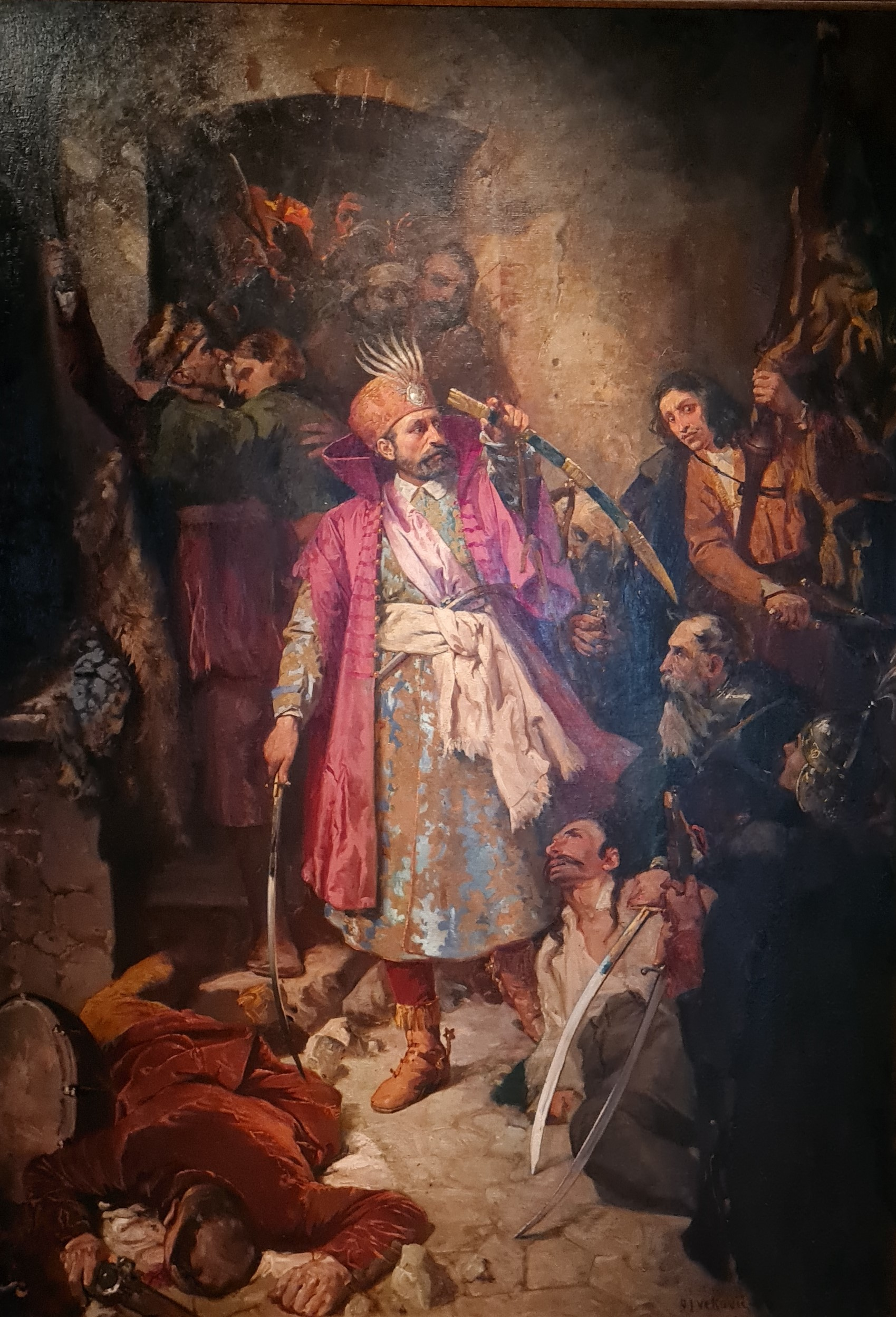
Nikola Šubić Zrinski

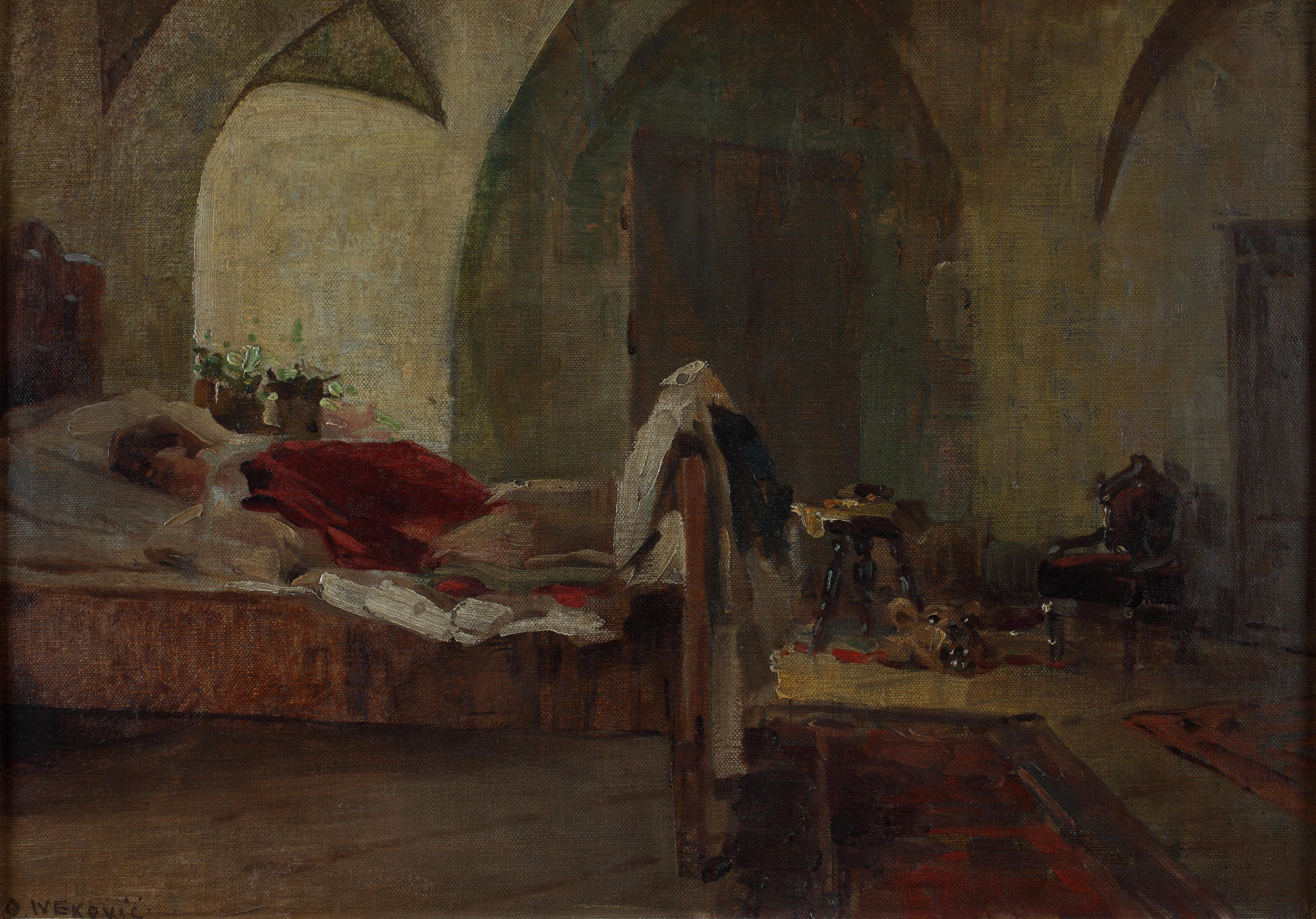
Veliki Tabor - Woman in Bed
