= Nova Kršlja =

- Village
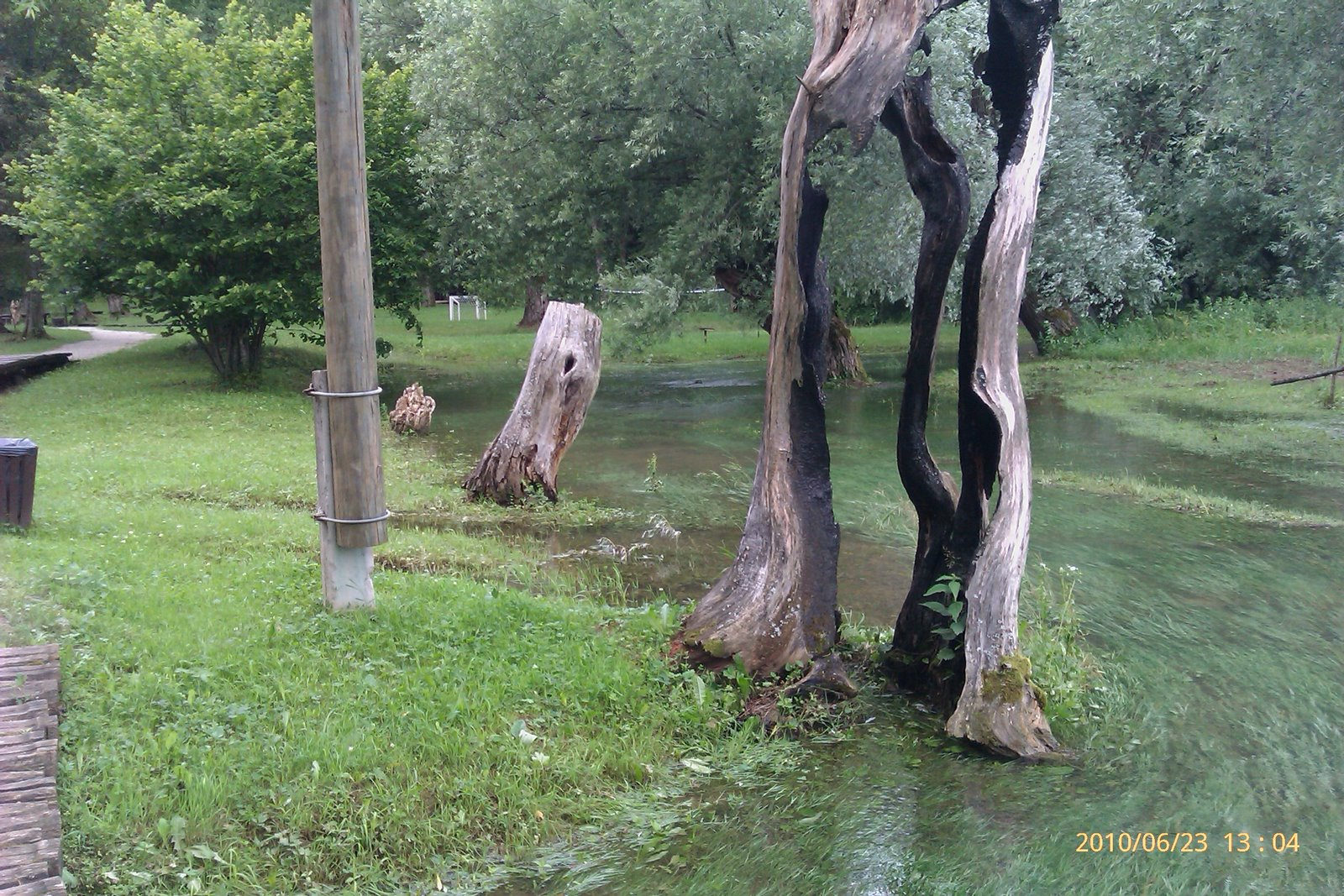
- High water at Nova Kršlja
- Interactive map of Nova Kršlja
- Coordinates: 45.003°N 15.739°E
- Country: Croatia
- County: Karlovac County
- Municipality: Rakovica

Area
  - Total: 7.4 sq mi (19.2 km^{2})

Population (2021)
  - Total: 69
  - Density: 9.3/sq mi (3.6/km^{2})
- Time zone: UTC+1 (CET)
  - Summer (DST): UTC+2 (CEST)

Nova Kršlja is a village in Croatia.

== History ==
In the Kingdom of Yugoslavia, the gendarmerie of the Drežnik Grad općina was not in Drežnik but in Nova Kršlja, farther away from Drežnik than the gendarmerie of the Rakovica općina. This was to ease the monitoring of peripheral areas like Kordunski Ljeskovac and Mašvina. In 1941, shortly after the establishment of the NDH, the Croatian Peasant Defense forces disarmed the gendarmerie of Nova Kršlja on their own initiative, replacing its commander Stojan Borojević with a Croat commander Mirko Frković, and dismissing all Serb members.

In 1941, Nikola Crnković was designated as its Ustaša zbirnik.

Following this, a number of Serbs were arrested for possession of arms and held captive at the arms depot in Nova Kršlja, only released thanks to the intervention of Franjo Rajković of the općina administration in Rakovica.

== Demographics ==
Village of Nova Kršlja: Population trends 1857–2021
v

population	724	713	690	748	840	814	746	738	382	407	362	358	323	251	85	66	69
	1857	1869	1880	1890	1900	1910	1921	1931	1948	1953	1961	1971	1981	1991	2001	2011	2021

Note:Includes data for Basara in 1880. Sources: Croatian Bureau of Statistics publications

== Infrastructure ==
In 1913, there were 7 gendarmeries in Slunj kotar: Cetin-grad, Gornja Močila, Nova Kršlja, Primišlje, Rakovica, Slunj and Veljun.
