= Brajdić Selo =

- Village
- Interactive map of Brajdić Selo
- Coordinates: 44.983°N 15.641°E
- Country: Croatia
- County: Karlovac County
- Municipality: Rakovica

Area
  - Total: 0.58 sq mi (1.5 km^{2})

Population (2021)
  - Total: 80
  - Density: 140/sq mi (53/km^{2})
- Time zone: UTC+1 (CET)
  - Summer (DST): UTC+2 (CEST)

Brajdić Selo is a village in Croatia.

== History ==
In 1941, Mate Cindrić was designated as its Ustaša zbirnik.

== Demographics ==
Village of Brajdić Selo: Population trends 1857–2021
v

| population | | | | | | | | | | | | | | | 95 | 82 | 80 |
| | 1857 | 1869 | 1880 | 1890 | 1900 | 1910 | 1921 | 1931 | 1948 | 1953 | 1961 | 1971 | 1981 | 1991 | 2001 | 2011 | 2021 |

Note:Separated from Rakovica in 2001. Sources: Croatian Bureau of Statistics publications
