= Veljun =

- Village
- Location within Croatia
- Coordinates: 45°15′N 15°33′E
- Country: Croatia
- County: Karlovac County
- City: Slunj

Area
  - Total: 9.9 km^{2} (3.8 sq mi)

Population (2021)
  - Total: 90
  - Density: 9.1/km^{2} (24/sq mi)
- Time zone: UTC+1 (CET)
  - Summer (DST): UTC+2 (CEST)
- Postal code: 47240
- Area code: +385 047

Veljun is a village in Croatia, under the Slunj township, in Karlovac County.

== Demographics ==
Village of Veljun: Population trends 1857–2021
v

population	482	512	488	542	560	612	551	681	482	528	522	490	416	367	114	112	90
	1857	1869	1880	1890	1900	1910	1921	1931	1948	1953	1961	1971	1981	1991	2001	2011	2021

Note:Some of its territory was transferred to Lapovac in 2001. Sources: Croatian Bureau of Statistics publications

In 1890, the obćina of Veljun (court at Veljun), with an area of 98 square kilometres (38 mi^{2}), belonged to the kotar of Slunj (Slunj court and electoral district) in the županija of Modruš-Rieka (Ogulin court and financial board). There were 839 houses, with a population of 5531. Its 18 villages and 3 hamlets were divided for taxation purposes into 7 porezne obćine, under the Slunj office.

== Infrastructure ==
In 1913, there were 7 gendarmeries in Slunj kotar: Cetin-grad, Gornja Močila, Nova Kršlja, Primišlje, Rakovica, Slunj and Veljun.
