= Mjesto Primišlje =

- Village
- Location within Croatia
- Coordinates: 45°10′N 15°28′E
- Country: Croatia
- County: Karlovac County
- City: Slunj

Area
  - Total: 62.6 km^{2} (24.2 sq mi)

Population (2021)
  - Total: 39
  - Density: 0.62/km^{2} (1.6/sq mi)
- Time zone: UTC+1 (CET)
  - Summer (DST): UTC+2 (CEST)
- Postal code: 47240
- Area code: +385 047

Mjesto Primišlje is a village in Croatia, under the Slunj township, in Karlovac County.

== History ==
On 12 April 1941, a group of 700 soldiers of the Royal Yugoslav Army launched an attack on Slunj from Primišlje in an attempt to penetrate further towards Bosnia, but after 6 hours the attack on Slunj failed. Wehrmacht forces entered Slunj at the behest of the Ustaša administration of Slunj in the evening, while the Luftwaffe bombed Yugoslav positions. A large number of soldiers were captured, and of those about 30 officers and 100 soldiers pledged allegiance to the NDH. Throughout that same day, a large number of Croat former Yugoslav soldiers from Bihać and Korenica had been making the same pledge. German soldiers returned to Karlovac that evening with 2 captive Yugoslav generals.

Beginning on 5 July 1942, the Battle of Primišlje took place. 500 Partisans from Perjasica and 700 from Tobolić laid siege to Primišlje. This included the 1st and 2nd brigade of the First Kordun Detachment and the 1st and 4th brigade of the 3rd battalion of the Second Kordun Detachment. On the 12th, 2 Ustaša companies came to their rescue.

== Infrastructure ==
In 1913, there were 7 gendarmeries in Slunj kotar: Cetin-grad, Gornja Močila, Nova Kršlja, Primišlje, Rakovica, Slunj and Veljun.

== Bibliography ==
- Trgo, Fabijan, ed. (1964). Zbornik dokumenata i podataka o Narodno-oslobodilačkom ratu Jugoslovenskih naroda. Vol. V, 32.
- Fras, Franz Julius (1835). "Primisslier-Kompagnie" [Primišlje Company]. Vollständige Topographie der Karlstädter-Militärgrenze mit besonderer Rücksicht auf die Beschreibung der Schlösser, Ruinen, Inscriptionen und andern dergleichen Ueberbleibseln von Antiquitäten: nach Anschauung und aus den zuverlässigsten Quellen dargestellt für reisende, und zur Förderung der Vaterlandsliebe (in German). Zagreb: Franz Suppan. pp. 309–319.
