= Gornja Močila, Croatia =

Gornja Močila
- Village
- Interactive map of Gornja Močila
- Coordinates: 45.033°N 15.557°E
- Country: Croatia
- County: Karlovac County
- Municipality: Rakovica

Area
  - Total: 20.2 sq mi (52.4 km^{2})

Population (2021)
  - Total: 4
  - Density: 0.20/sq mi (0.076/km^{2})
- Time zone: UTC+1 (CET)
  - Summer (DST): UTC+2 (CEST)
- Postal code: 47240 Slunj
- Area code: +385 (0)47

Gornja Močila is a village in Croatia.

== History ==
With the withdrawal of the Italians, the chances of a successful Serb rebellion increased. Shortly after the Drvar uprising, Božidar Cerovski, director of the Directorate of the Ustaša Police, arrived in Slunj, on the evening of 29 July 1941, along with an undetermined number of Ustaše from Zagreb for the removal of "undesirable elements". In the morning of the 30th, they broke up into several groups and walked through Serb inhabitted settlements with lists of such individuals, including in Močila, detaining them and transporting them to Oštarski Stanovi, where they were executed on the order of Cerovski.

== Demographics ==
Village of Gornja Močila: Population trends 1857–2021
v

population	854	1224	1319	1546	1735	1707	1472	1551	765	756	719	63	56	39	8	4	4
	1857	1869	1880	1890	1900	1910	1921	1931	1948	1953	1961	1971	1981	1991	2001	2011	2021

Note:Includes population count of Donja Močila, which was considered a statistical village until 1948. From 1857 to 1880 and again in 1948, part of the population was counted under Jezero I dio in Plaški municipality. In 2001, Jezero II dio was added to Gornja Močila. From 1890 on it includes Jezero II dio. Sources: Croatian Bureau of Statistics publications

== Infrastructure ==
In 1913, there were 7 gendarmeries in Slunj kotar: Cetin-grad, Gornja Močila, Nova Kršlja, Primišlje, Rakovica, Slunj and Veljun.
