= Drežnik Brezovički =

- Village
- Interactive map of Drežnik Brezovički
- Location within Croatia
- Coordinates: 45°43′22″N 15°53′45″E
- Country: Croatia
- County: City of Zagreb

Area
  - Total: 0.27 sq mi (0.7 km^{2})
- Elevation: 397 ft (121 m)

Population (2021)
  - Total: 692
  - Density: 2,600/sq mi (990/km^{2})
- Time zone: UTC+1 (CET)
  - Summer (DST): UTC+2 (CEST)

Drežnik Brezovički is a village in Croatia. It is formally a settlement (naselje) of Zagreb, the capital of Croatia.

== Demographics ==
According to the 2021 census, its population was 692. According to the 2011 census, it had 663 inhabitants.
