= Korita, Karlovac County =

Korita
- Village
- Interactive map of Korita
- Coordinates: 44.971°N 15.612°E
- Country: Croatia
- County: Karlovac County
- Municipality: Rakovica

Area
  - Total: 6.9 sq mi (17.9 km^{2})

Population (2021)
  - Total: 45
  - Density: 6.5/sq mi (2.5/km^{2})
- Time zone: UTC+1 (CET)
  - Summer (DST): UTC+2 (CEST)
- Postal code: 47240 Slunj
- Area code: +385 (0)47

Korita is a village in Croatia. It is located near the famous Plitvice Lakes National Park.

== History ==
In 1941, Stipe Sabljak was designated as its Ustaša zbirnik.

== Demographics ==
Village of Korita: Population trends 1857–2021
v

population	380			590	645	651	503	535	495	418	364	289	118	87	19	51	45
	1857	1869	1880	1890	1900	1910	1921	1931	1948	1953	1961	1971	1981	1991	2001	2011	2021

Note:"Korita Rakovička" from 1910 to 1991. Until 1948 considered a "dio naselja" of Rakovica, and in 1869 and 1880 its population was included in Rakovica. Sources: Croatian Bureau of Statistics publications
