= Drežnik Viaduct =

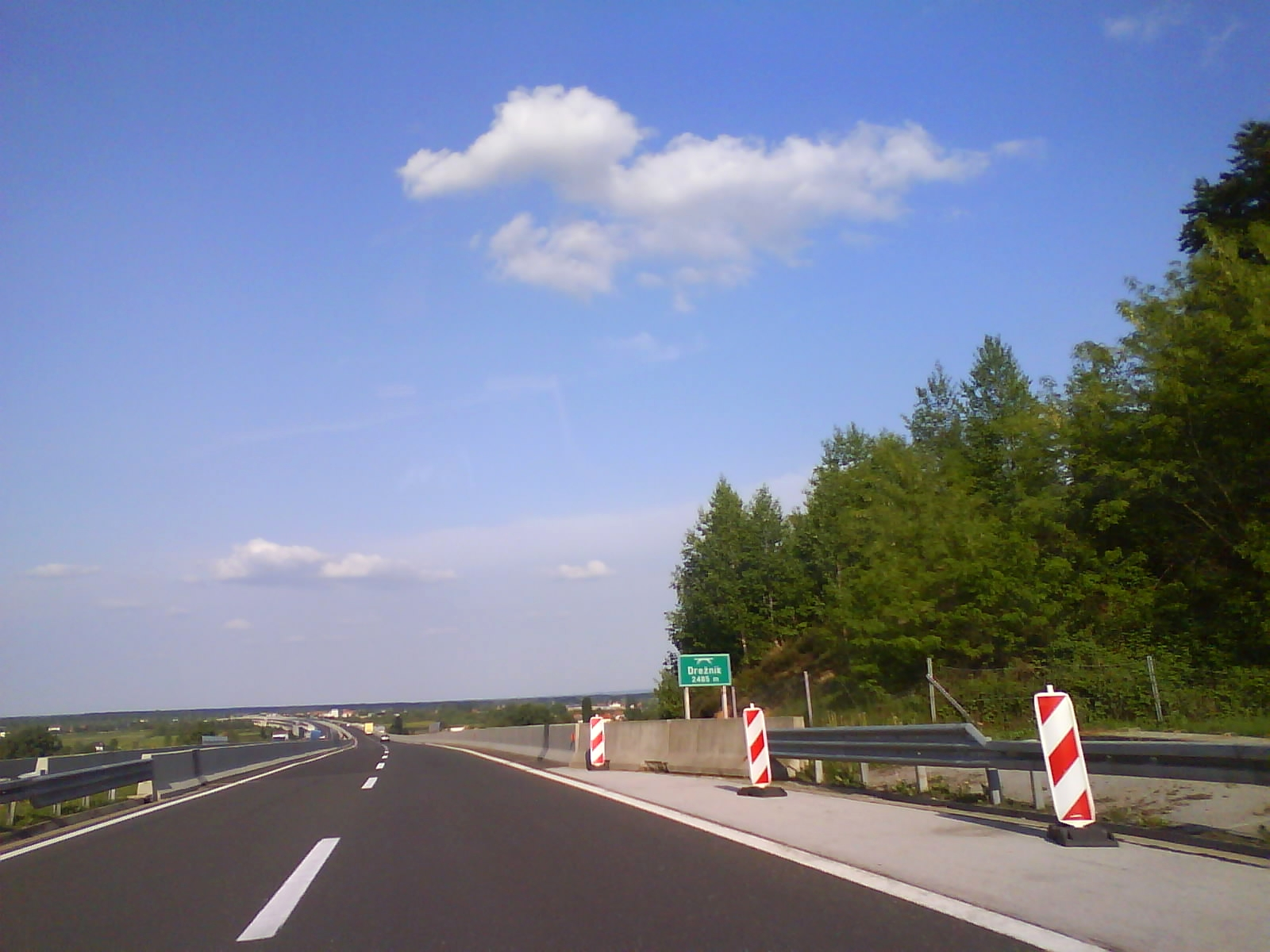
- The southern approach to the Drežnik Viaduct
- Coordinates: 45.510317°N 15.525484°E
- Carries: Road vehicles
- Crosses: Kupa River and Karlovac suburbs
- Locale: Central Croatia
- Official name: Viadukt Drežnik
- Maintained by: Hrvatske autoceste

Characteristics
- Design: Beam bridge
- Total length: 2485 m
- Width: 2 x 10.5 m
- Longest span: 70 m

History
- Opened: 2001

Statistics
- Toll: charged as a part of A1 motorway toll

The Drežnik Viaduct is located in Karlovac, Croatia, immediately to the west of the Karlovac interchange on the A1 motorway. It is the longest viaduct in Croatia, spanning 2,485 metres (8,153 ft). It is executed in seven segments (225 m (738 ft)+270 m (890 ft)+4x408 m (1,339 ft)+358 m (1,175 ft) long), separated by expansion joints. The viaduct was constructed by Konstruktor, Split, as the main contractor, and Viadukt and Hidroelektra of Zagreb as subcontractors in 2000 and 2001.

The viaduct is executed as two parallel structures, each 10.5 m (34 ft) wide. Their superstructures are continuous structures with spans of 35 metres (115 ft) to 70 metres (230 ft) m above Kupa River. The carriageway of each of the bridges consists of two traffic lanes 3.75 metres (12.3 ft) wide and two marginal strips 1 metre (3.3 ft) wide. There are no sidewalks and no emergency lanes on the bridge itself. The superstructure is executed in I-section prefabricated reinforced concrete girders, made monolithic with in situ executed transverse beams and the deck slab. The longitudinal girders are mostly of a uniform length (traversing 35 m (115 ft) spans), except for those spanning the river and the longest, 70 m (230 ft) long span. Foundations of the viaduct are executed on piles.

Cost of the construction works related to the Drežnik Viaduct was 250 million Croatian kuna.

The Drežnik Viaduct is the largest and the most significant structure on the Karlovac - Bosiljevo 1 section of the A1 motorway, which carries the transit traffic between Zagreb in the north and Rijeka and Split in the south, and channels it away from the Karlovac city centre, dramatically reducing travel times between those cities and relieving traffic congestion from the D1 state road running through Karlovac, which was especially severe during summer seasons.

== Traffic volume ==
Traffic is regularly counted and reported by Hrvatske autoceste, operator of the viaduct and the A1 motorway where the structure is located, and published by Hrvatske ceste. Substantial variations between annual (AADT) and summer (ASDT) traffic volumes are attributed to the fact that the bridge carries substantial tourist traffic to the Adriatic resorts. The traffic count is performed using analysis of motorway toll ticket sales.

Drežnik Viaduct traffic volume
Road	Counting site	AADT	ASDT	Notes
A1	1804 Karlovac south	21,699	43,188	Between Karlovac and Bosiljevo 1 interchanges.

== See also ==
- List of arch bridges by length
- List of bridges by length
