= Drežnik Grad =

- Village
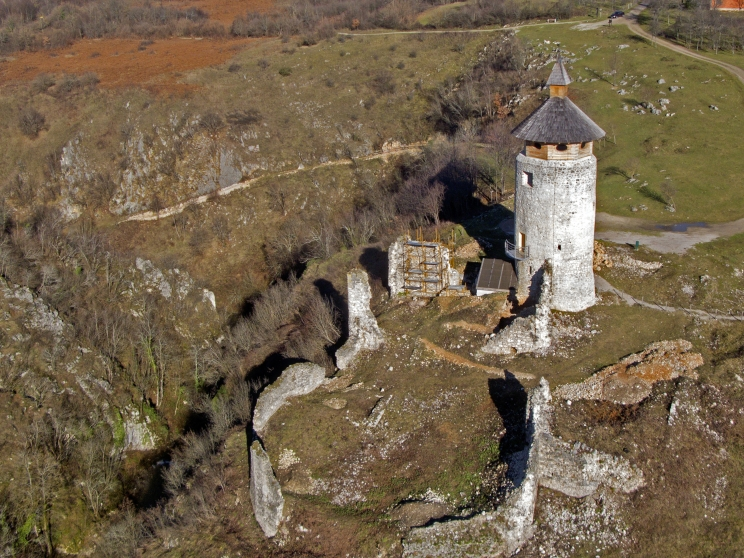
- Medieval fort above the village

- Location within Croatia
- Coordinates: 44°57′N 15°40′E
- Country: Croatia
- County: Karlovac County
- Municipality: Rakovica

Area
  - Total: 7.5 km^{2} (2.9 sq mi)

Population (2021)
  - Total: 313
  - Density: 42/km^{2} (110/sq mi)
- Time zone: UTC+1 (CET)
  - Summer (DST): UTC+2 (CEST)

Drežnik Grad is a village in Croatia. It is connected by the D1 highway.

== History ==
The castle of Drežnik was built in the 13th century.

The castle came under the authority of the Military Frontier, but it was abandoned by them in the 18th century.

=== WWII ===
==== 1941 ====
In 1941, Marko Brajdić was designated as its Ustaša zbirnik.

On April 12, 1941, its mayor Zvonko Pavlić was replaced by the Ustaše with Jure Krizmanić.

At the end of June, the parish priest of Drežnik, Dragutin Štimac, conducted conversions to Catholicism for the Serbian population of the Bihać kotar, only for the local Ustaše to detain them in Bihać, being released only upon the intervention of the parish priest of Bihać. By that time, not a single Serbian Orthodox priest remained on the territory of Drežnik Grad, having obtained permission to leave for the GMS. So, the president of the kotar Eduard Lenčerić confiscated all parish registries.

The Italian Army left Rakovica and Drežnik Grad for Ogulin, where the NDH had set up the administrative capital of the new županija of Modruš, on 12 July 1941.

On 15 August 1941, a letter was written on behalf of 91 families to the poglavnik requesting to be allowed to convert to Catholicism and be treated like Croats:

"We promise that we will remain always loyal and obedient to You, and to love the land in which we live, for we are not responsible for these sufferings inflicted upon us by uneducated peasants and our former lords, priests and teachers, who taught us falsely, fled for safety on time." (Note: "Obećavamo da ćemo Vam uvijek biti vjerni i pokorni, te ljubiti zemlju u kojoj živimo, jer mi nijesmo krivi za ove patnje koje su nas neuke seljake zadesile a naša bivša gospoda, popovi i učitelji, koji su nas krivo učili, sklonili su se na vrijeme.")

==== 1942 ====
On 28–30 June 1942 around Sadilovac and Dubrave, a battle took place between a group of about 1000 Partisans and 110 Croatian Domobrani, in which about 150 Partisans died and 80 were wounded, while only 1 Domobran was killed.

== Demographics ==
In 1895, the obćina of Drežnik (court at Drežnik), with an area of 106 square kilometres (41 mi^{2}), belonged to the kotar of Slunj (Slunj court and electoral district) in the županija of Modruš-Rieka (Ogulin court and financial board). There were 790 houses, with a population of 4998 (the lowest in Slunj kotar). Its 7 villages and 14 hamlets were divided for taxation purposes into 3 porezne obćine, under the Slunj office.

== Selected works ==
- Prša, Želimir (2022-05-15). "Općine Rakovica i Drežnik Grad u Drugom svjetskom ratu (1941.- 1945.)". Podplješivički graničari. pp. 51–90. ISSN 2459-9395.

== Bibliography ==
- Kruhek, Milan (1976). Stari gradovi između Kupe i Korane [Old Castles Between the Kupa and the Korana] (PDF) (in Croatian).
- Trgo, Fabijan, ed. (1964). Zbornik dokumenata i podataka o Narodno-oslobodilačkom ratu Jugoslovenskih naroda. Vol. V, 32.
- Fras, Franz Julius (1835). "Drexniker-Kompagnie" [Drežnik Company]. Vollständige Topographie der Karlstädter-Militärgrenze mit besonderer Rücksicht auf die Beschreibung der Schlösser, Ruinen, Inscriptionen und andern dergleichen Ueberbleibseln von Antiquitäten: nach Anschauung und aus den zuverlässigsten Quellen dargestellt für reisende, und zur Förderung der Vaterlandsliebe (in German). Zagreb: Franz Suppan. pp. 307–309.
