= Grabovac, Karlovac County =

- Village
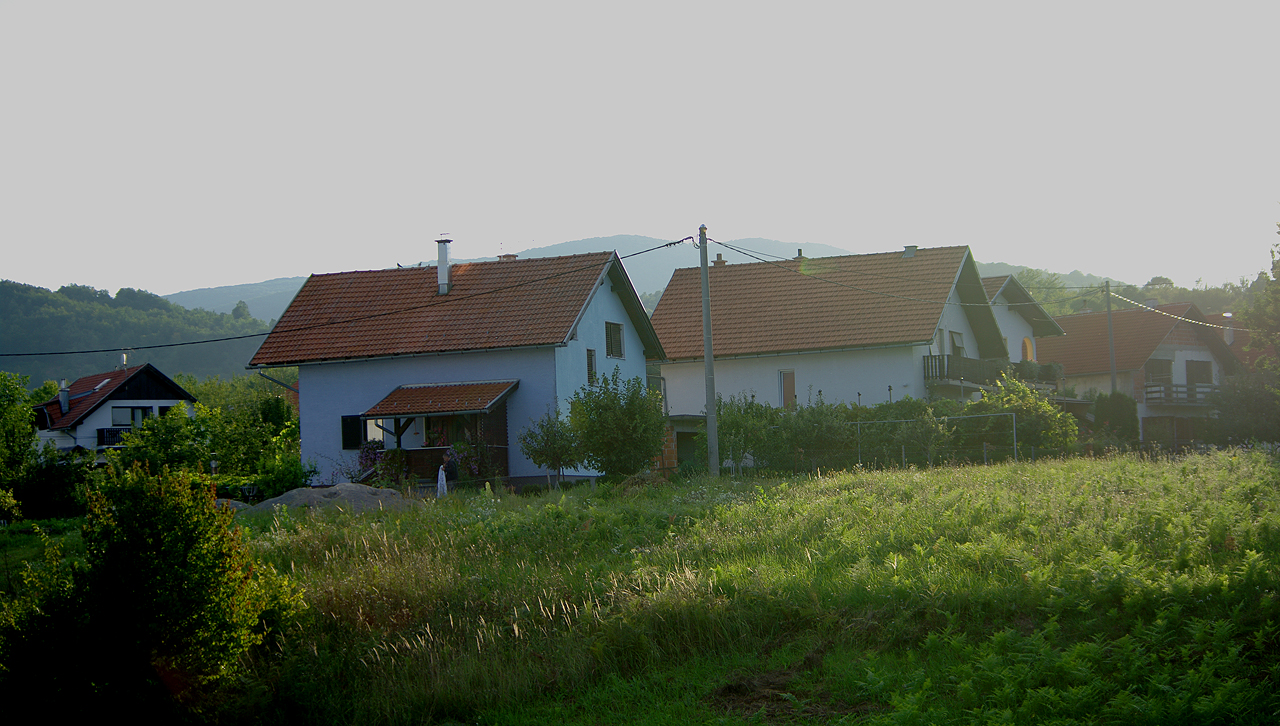
- View of Grabovac, Croatia

- Location within Croatia
- Coordinates: 44°59′10″N 15°40′44″E
- Country: Croatia
- County: Karlovac County

Area
  - Total: 9.5 km^{2} (3.7 sq mi)

Population (2021)
  - Total: 309
  - Density: 33/km^{2} (84/sq mi)
- Time zone: UTC+1 (CET)
  - Summer (DST): UTC+2 (CEST)

Grabovac is a village in Karlovac County, Croatia. It is on the D1 highway.
