= Županija =

South Slavic administrative subdivision

A županija (singular; plural: županije) is a Croatian term for administrative subdivisions.

The etymology is the South Slavic term župa, which means "parish" in Croatian. The Slovene term župnija is related.

The term Županija is used in:

- Croatia: counties of Croatia
- Cantons of the Federation of Bosnia and Herzegovina are frequently referred to as županije by the Bosnian Croat population.
