= Broćanac, Croatia =

Coordinates: 45°03′43″N 15°36′28″E

Broćanac
- Village
- Interactive map of Broćanac
- Country: Croatia

Area
  - Total: 3.1 sq mi (7.9 km^{2})

Population (2021)
  - Total: 25
  - Density: 8.2/sq mi (3.2/km^{2})
- Time zone: UTC+1 (CET)
  - Summer (DST): UTC+2 (CEST)

Broćanac is a village in Croatia. It is connected by the D1 highway.

== History ==
With the withdrawal of the Italians, the chances of a successful Serb rebellion increased. Shortly after the Drvar uprising, Božidar Cerovski, director of the Directorate of the Ustaša Police, arrived in Slunj, on the evening of 29 July 1941, along with an undetermined number of Ustaše from Zagreb for the removal of "undesirable elements". In the morning of the 30th, they broke up into several groups and walked through Serb inhabitted settlements with lists of such individuals, including in Broćanac, detaining them and transporting them to Oštarski Stanovi, where they were executed on the order of Cerovski.
