= Irinovac =

Coordinates: 44°58′N 15°39′E

- Village
- Interactive map of Irinovac
- Country: Croatia

Area
  - Total: 0.77 sq mi (2.0 km^{2})

Population (2021)
  - Total: 135
  - Density: 170/sq mi (67/km^{2})
- Time zone: UTC+1 (CET)
  - Summer (DST): UTC+2 (CEST)

Irinovac is a village in Croatia. It is connected by the D1 highway.
