= Kordun =

Region of Croatia

Coordinates: 45°07′N 15°35′E

- Geographic region^{a}
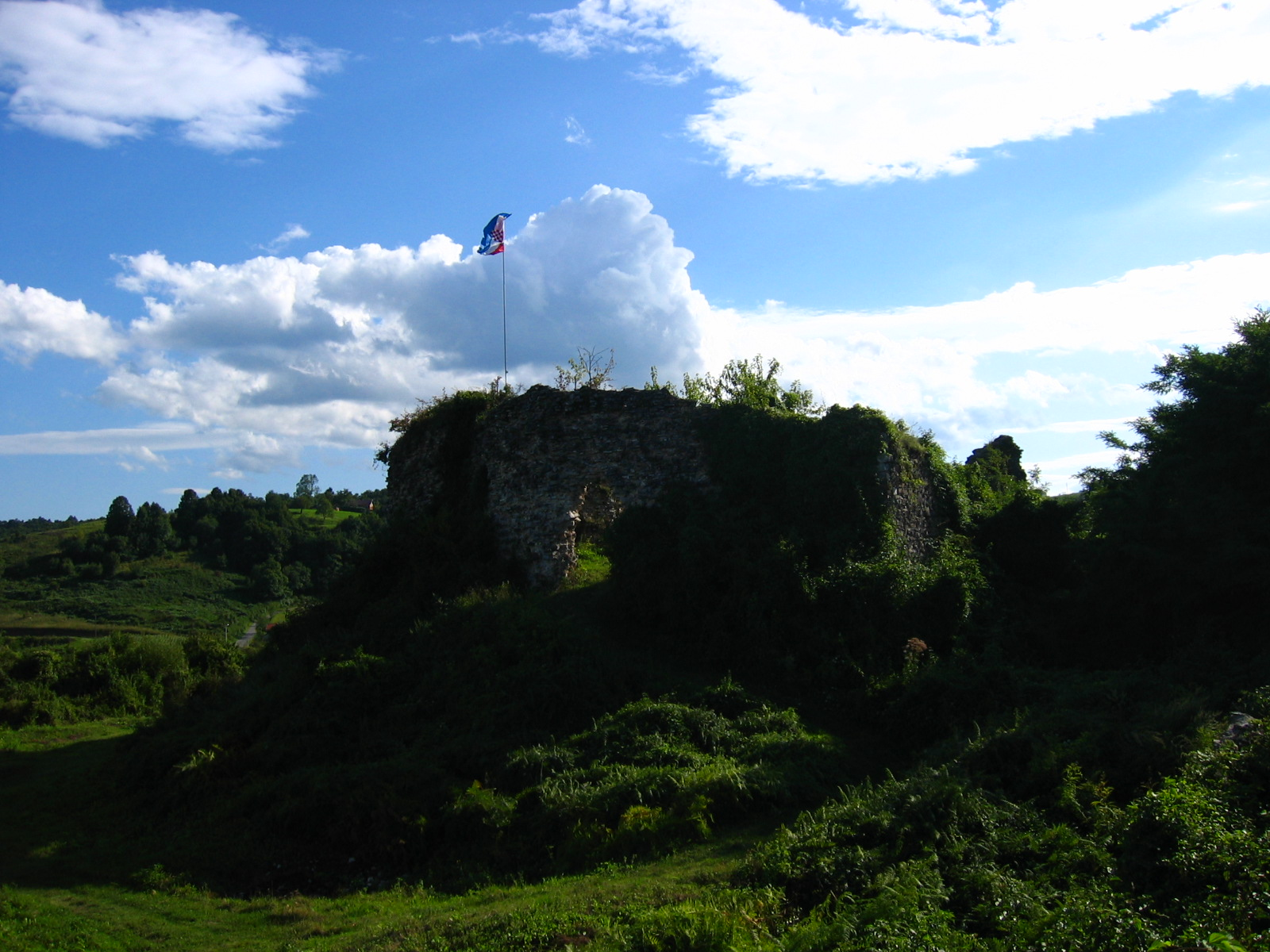
- Cetin Castle in Kordun
- Etymology: French: cordon
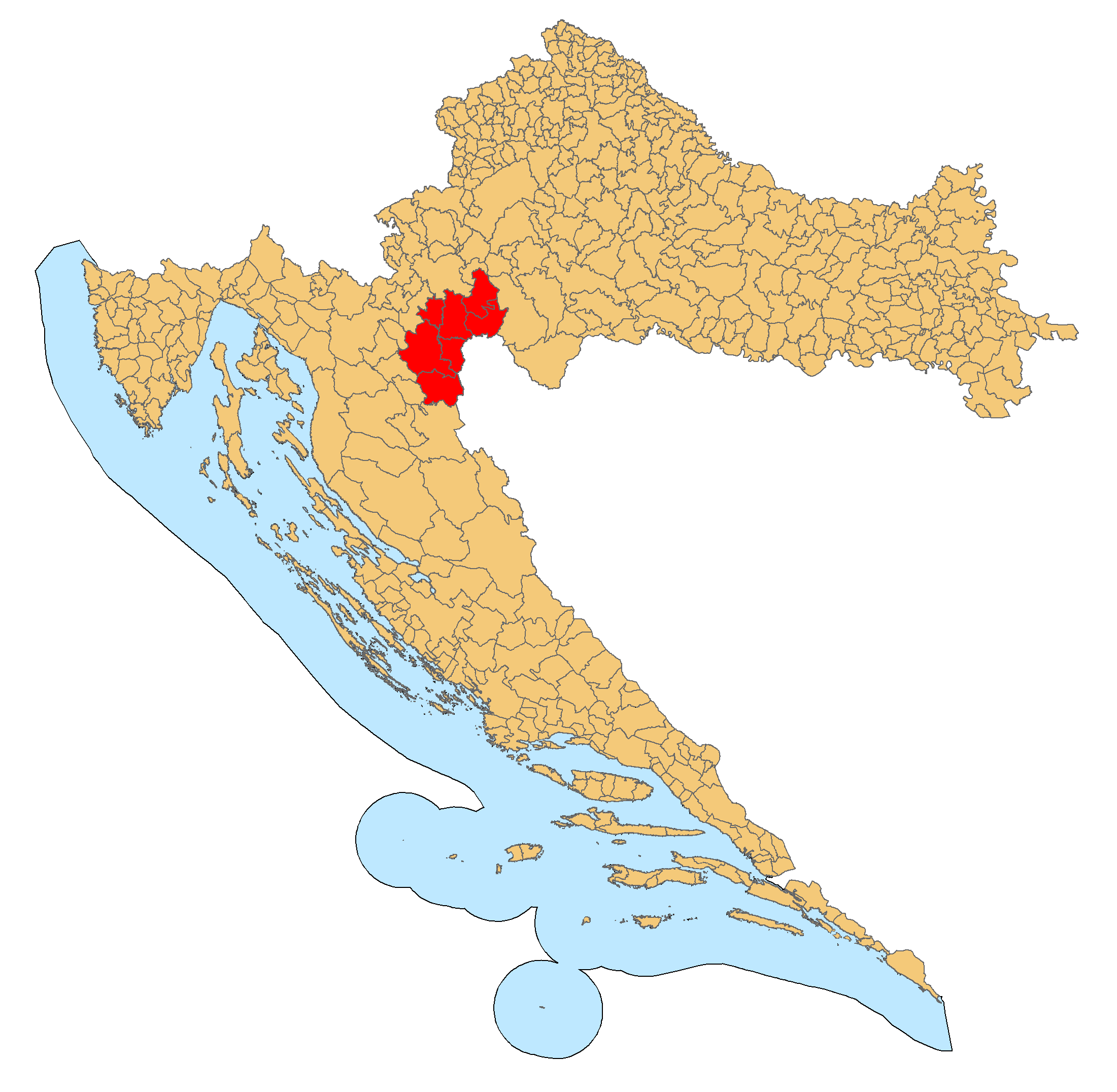
- Kordun on a map of Croatia colored in red. Mainly located in the east of modern-day Karlovac County)
- Country: Croatia
- Largest town: Slunj

Population (2021)^{c}
  - Total: 17,148
- ^{a} Kordun is not designated as an official region, it is a geographic region only.

The Kordun (Croatian pronunciation: [kǒrduːn]) region is a part of central Croatia from the bottom of the Petrova Gora (Peter's mountain) mountain range, which extends along the rivers Korana and Slunjčica, and forms part of the border region to Bosnia and Herzegovina. Within Croatia, Kordun is bordered by the Lika region to the south and by Banovina or Banija to the east.

Most of Kordun with its centre Slunj belongs to Karlovac County (Slunj, Cetingrad, Krnjak, Rakovica and Vojnić). Vrginmost belongs to Sisak-Moslavina County.

In former times, this region belonged to the Habsburg Military Frontier towards the Ottoman Empire which is more or less exactly the same today which the border of Croatia and Bosnia. Following the Croatian War of Independence, a number of towns and municipalities in the region were designated Areas of Special State Concern.

The area has rich wood resources. Today, the economic situation is slowly improving, but there is still a large tendency of emigration from the region to larger cities. A typical phenomenon of this region is the porous composition of the karst soil (consisting of limestone), which creates numerous crater-like dolines (sinkholes, Croatian dolina).

== Name ==
The name Kordun was created during the period of the Military Frontier and is closely related to the strategic significance of the region. It comes from the French word "cordon militaire" which translates into military belt. In this case, it refers to a series of former linked guardhouses and forts with the aim of repelling armies coming from the formerly Turkish controlled territory of western Bosnia.

== See also ==
- Geography of Croatia

== Sources ==
- Kordun at enciklopedija.hr (in Croatian)
