= Oštarski Stanovi =

Coordinates: 45°01′19″N 15°38′53″E

- Village
- Interactive map of Oštarski Stanovi
- Country: Croatia
- County: Karlovac County

Area
  - Total: 4.8 km^{2} (1.9 sq mi)

Population (2021)
  - Total: 130
  - Density: 27/km^{2} (70/sq mi)
- Time zone: UTC+1 (CET)
  - Summer (DST): UTC+2 (CEST)

Oštarski Stanovi is a village in Croatia. It is connected by the D1 highway.

== History ==
In 1941, Dragan Božičević was designated as its Ustaša zbirnik.

With the withdrawal of the Italians, the chances of a successful Serb rebellion increased. Shortly after the Drvar uprising, Božidar Cerovski, director of the Directorate of the Ustaša Police, arrived in Slunj, on the evening of 29 July 1941, along with an undetermined number of Ustaše from Zagreb for the removal of "undesirable elements". In the morning of the 30th, they broke up into several groups and walked through Serb inhabitted settlements with lists of such individuals, detaining them and transporting them to Oštarski Stanovi, where they were executed, 106 in number, on the order of Cerovski.

On 1 July 1942, Partisans attacked the Domobran garrison Oštarski Stanovi and Rakovica, killing 1 and wounding 2; several Partisans were killed and wounded.

== Bibliography ==
- Trgo, Fabijan, ed. (1964). Zbornik dokumenata i podataka o Narodno-oslobodilačkom ratu Jugoslovenskih naroda. Vol. V, 32.
