= Siege of Slunj =

Armed Conflict

Battle of Slunj
- Part of Croatian War of Independence
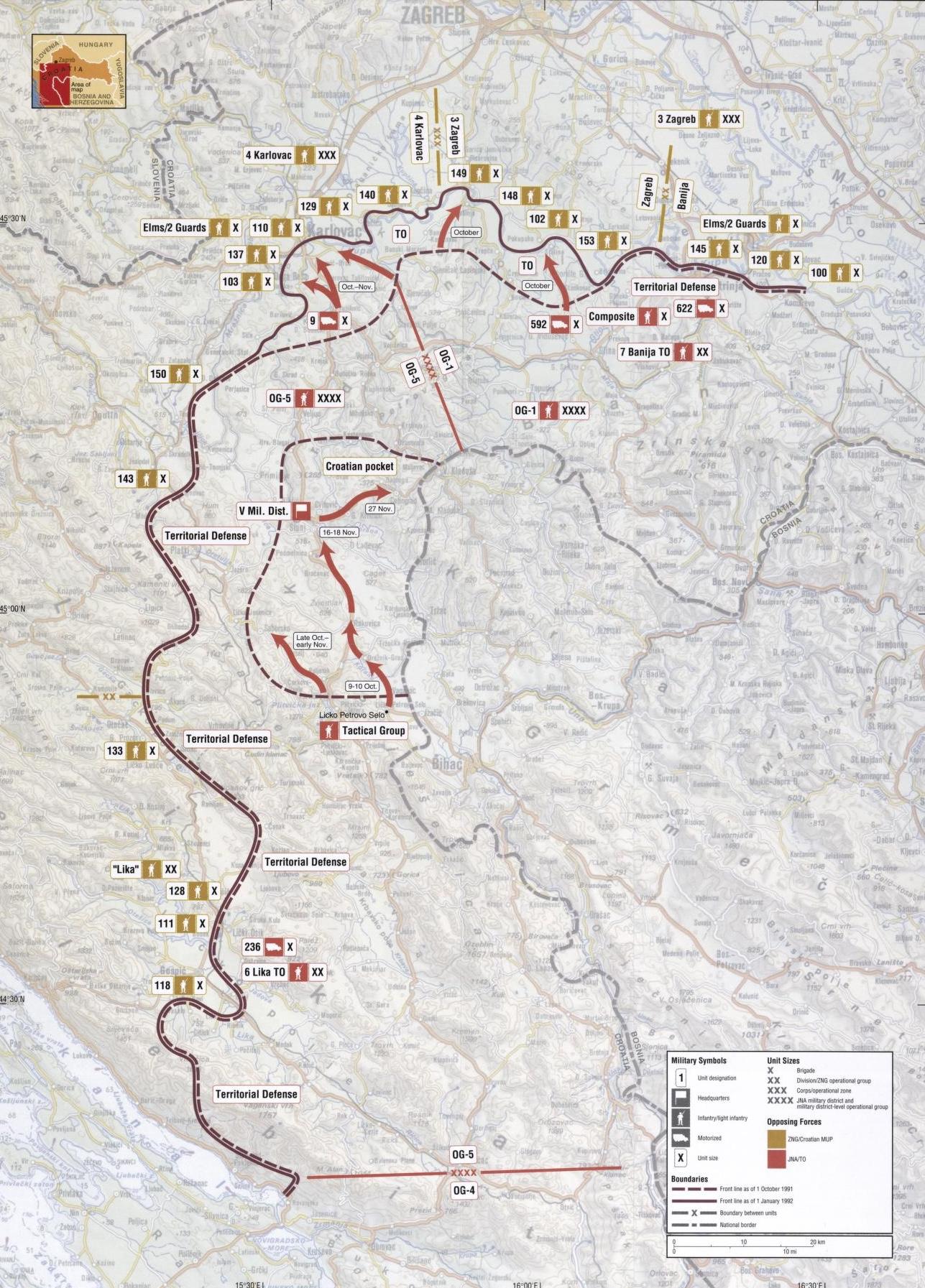
- Map of operations in the Banija-Kordun-Lika region, October 1991–January 1992
Date	9 October 1991 – 27 November 1991
Location	Slunj, Croatia
Result	Yugoslav–SAO Krajina victory: 16,000 Croats expelled
Territorial changes	Serbs capture 800 km² (309 sq mi) of territory.

Belligerents
Socialist Federal Republic of Yugoslavia: SAO Krajina	Republic of Croatia

Commanders and leaders
Željko Ražnatović; Čedomir Bulat; Trpko Zdravkovski	Anton Tus; Josip Tuličić; Željko Brozović †

Units involved
Yugoslav People's Army: Yugoslav Ground Forces; 329th Armoured Brigade (elements); 236th Motorized Brigade (elements); D-30 Howitzer Battalion; Krajina Territorial Defense; Serb Volunteer Guard	Croatian National Guard: 4th Guards Brigade (elements); Local ZNG units; Village militia and Croatian Police; Croatian Defence Forces

Strength
3,500+ 20 tanks, 10 APCs, 18 artillery pieces	~2,000 (Croatian estimate)

Casualties and losses
60 soldiers killed	300 soldiers killed
- 297 Croat civilians killed

The siege of Slunj was an armed conflict in the territory of the municipality of Slunj in 1991 during the Croatian War of Independence. It was fought between the Croatian Army (HV) on one side, and the Yugoslav People's Army (JNA) on the other. It was the largest Croatian enclave that was separated from the rest of Croatia during the conflict. After the JNA took over Slunj, over 16,000 Croats were expelled from the enclave and hundreds were murdered in war crimes during the occupation until the end of the war.

== Background ==
At the beginning of 1991, Croatia had no regular army. In an effort to bolster its defence, it doubled police numbers to about 20,000. The most effective part of the force was the 3,000-strong special police deployed in 12 battalions which adopted principles of military organization. In addition, there were 9,000–10,000 regionally-organized reserve police; these were set up in 16 battalions and 10 independent companies, but the units lacked weapons. In May, in response to the deteriorating situation, the Croatian government established the Croatian National Guard (Zbor narodne garde – ZNG) by amalgamating the special police battalions into four guards brigades. The guards brigades initially comprised about 8,000 troops, and were subordinated to the Ministry of Defence headed by retired JNA General Martin Špegelj. The regional police, by then expanded to 40,000, was also attached to the ZNG and re-organized into 19 brigades and 14 independent battalions. The guards brigades were the only ZNG units that were fully equipped with small arms, while heavier weapons and an effective command and control structure were lacking throughout the ZNG. At the time, Croatian weapon stocks consisted of 30,000 small arms purchased abroad in addition to 15,000 previously owned by the police. A new 10,000-strong special police was established to replace the personnel transferred to the ZNG guards brigades.

The Croatian view of the JNA role in the Serb revolt gradually evolved between January and September 1991. The initial plan of Croatian President Franjo Tuđman was to win support for Croatia from the European Community (EC) and the United States, and he dismissed advice to seize JNA barracks and storage facilities in the country. Tuđman's stance was motivated by his belief that Croatia could not win a war against the JNA. The ZNG was limited to a defensive role even though the actions of the JNA appeared to be coordinated with Croatian Serb forces. This impression was reinforced by buffer zones the JNA established after armed conflicts between the Croatian Serb guerrillas and the ZNG—the JNA intervened after the ZNG lost ground, leaving the Croatian Serbs in control of the territory. Furthermore, the JNA provided some weapons to the Croatian Serbs, although the bulk of the weaponry was provided from Serbia's TO and Ministry of Internal Affairs stocks. After the start of the JNA intervention in Slovenia in late June, conscripts began deserting from the JNA and very few were drafted to replace them, except in Serbia.

== The battle ==
The Croatian-held pocket around the town of Slunj, on the boundary of the Lika and Kordun areas, blocked the Croatian Serbs from linking up the regions they held to the north and the south. It was a key objective for their forces, which were now openly joined by the JNA. Early in October JNA/TO forces began nibbling at the enclave, seizing some outlying villages about 25 kilometers southeast of Slunj near the Bosnian border. A concerted effort to take the town began in early November. Pushing primarily from the Plitvice Lakes area to the south, JNA and TO troops gradually worked their way in toward Slunj, which fell on 16–18 November. The surviving Croatian defenders fell back toward the Bosnian border, near the small town of Cetingrad, about seven kilometers southwest of the town of Velika Kladuša, where Federal forces overran them on 27 November. But many of the Croatian ZNG and MUP fighters chose internment in Bosnia over surrender to the JNA or the local Serbs.

The JNA/TO operation to take Slunj typified the nature and scope of the vicious, small-scale actions that characterized the war in the Banija-Kordun-Lika regions. By late October the JNA had begun preparations for a major assault to close the pocket. To control the operation, the JNA appears to have formed two tactical group headquarters and began to move reinforcements into the area. Colonel Čedomir Bulat was to command Tactical Group-2 along the primary attack axis.'° The reinforcements included most of an armored battalion from the 329th Armored Brigade, elements of a newly arrived partisan brigade, and a D-30 howitzer battalion.' Meanwhile, the 236th Motorized Brigade, the bulk of which was deployed near Gospić, moved elements—probably a reinforced motorized battalion—into position. These forces, together with about a battalion of TO troops from Korenica and one from Plaški, probably were formed into two to four reinforced battalion battle groups and were to attack the pocket from positions about 20 kilometers directly south of Slunj, near the Plitvice Lakes.'’ Exempted from the assault were the JNA forces at the Slunj training area 10 to 15 kilometers west/southwest of town, which appear to have been assigned the defensive role of containing the ZNG/MUP forces there. The tactical group probably numbered 3,000 to 3,500 troops in total, with about 20 tanks, 10 APCs, and 18 artillery pieces.

Little is known about the structure and number of Croatian forces in the pocket, but probably they numbered no more than 2,000 ill-equipped local or volunteer ZNG troops and special or regular police, with perhaps a sprinkling of village guards carrying their hunting rifles.

The JNA’s slow drive toward Slunj began in early November, as Bulat’s tactical group converged on the town, systematically destroying Croatian villages in its path. The JNA/TO advance appears to have featured successive drives by the reinforced battle groups, each moving along a main road and probably led by a company of armor and/or self-propelled air defense vehicles; flanking infantry probably were detailed to clear the areas alongside the road. On approaching a Croatian village, tank and artillery fire would suppress any defenders and scare away the residents; the JNA and TO then burned the village. RV i PVO fighter-bombers supplemented these attacks.

The JNA’s road-bound methods and limited infantry, however, made Bulat’s force vulnerable to Croatian hit-and-run attacks from the region’s heavily forested hills and mountains, and attacks like these appear to have slowed the advance. The main push, from the Plitvice Lakes area toward Slunj, had barely reached the outskirts of Rakovica by 12 November—an advance of only two or three kilometers. The secondary attack toward Saborsko also moved slowly. Over the next week, however, the advance gained momentum and finally rolled over Slunj and its surrounding villages between 16 and 18 November.'9 Over the next ten days JNA and TO troops slowly pursued Croatian forces retreating toward the last Croatian stronghold at Cetingrad, on the Bosnian border. It fell on 27 November.

== Croatian attempt to lift the siege ==
Operation Freedom ’91
- Part of Croatian War of Independence
Date	22 September 1991
Location	Tržić Tounjski
Result	Yugoslav victory

Belligerents
Yugoslavia	Croatia

Commanders and leaders
unknown	(Croatia) Darko Rukavina (Croatia) Željko Brozović †

Units involved
Yugoslav People's Army	Anti-Terrorist Unit Lučko; SJP “Roda” SJP “Grom”

Strength
unknown	300

Casualties and losses
none	several killed

Operation Freedom ’91 was a military operation during the Croatian War of Independence, launched by the Croatian National Guard against the Yugoslav People's Army (JNA), with the objective of breaking the blockade of Slunj. it was decided that on 22 August 1991 an operation would be launched to relieve Slunj along the route Kamenica Skradnička–Tržić Tounjski–Mjesto Primišlje–Gornje Primišlje–Zečev Varoš–Slunj. The operation was commanded by Darko Rukavina. Approximately 300 members of the SJP “Grom”, SJP “Roda” of the Varaždin Police Administration, and the Anti-Terrorist Unit Lučko took part in the operation. Supported by one 82 mm mortar and two armored combat vehicles, Croatian forces launched the attack.

Upon entering Tržić Tounjski, they encountered the Yugoslav People's Army, which halted their further advance. The JNA pushed them back to their initial positions. During the operation, the Croatian side suffered several fatalities, including Željko Brozović (a high-ranking serviceman) from Hreljin Ogulinski.

== Aftermath ==
The fall of Slunj represented a significant loss for the HV because this created a link between what was to be the northern half of the RSK centered around Petrinja-Karlovac and the southern portion near Knin. This was a strategic success that enabled further operations in the region.

During the Serb occupation of Slunj and surrounding areas 300 Croat soldiers were killed and until 1995, 297 Croat civilians were killed in several war crimes, most victims were the elderly, women and children.

On August 4, 1995, the Croats launched Operation Storm to defeat and capture remaining part of Republic of Serbian Krajina excluding Eastern Slavonia. Over 250,000 Serb civilians went to exile during this operation, and on August 6, 1995, the Croatian army captured Slunj.
