= Glina (river) =

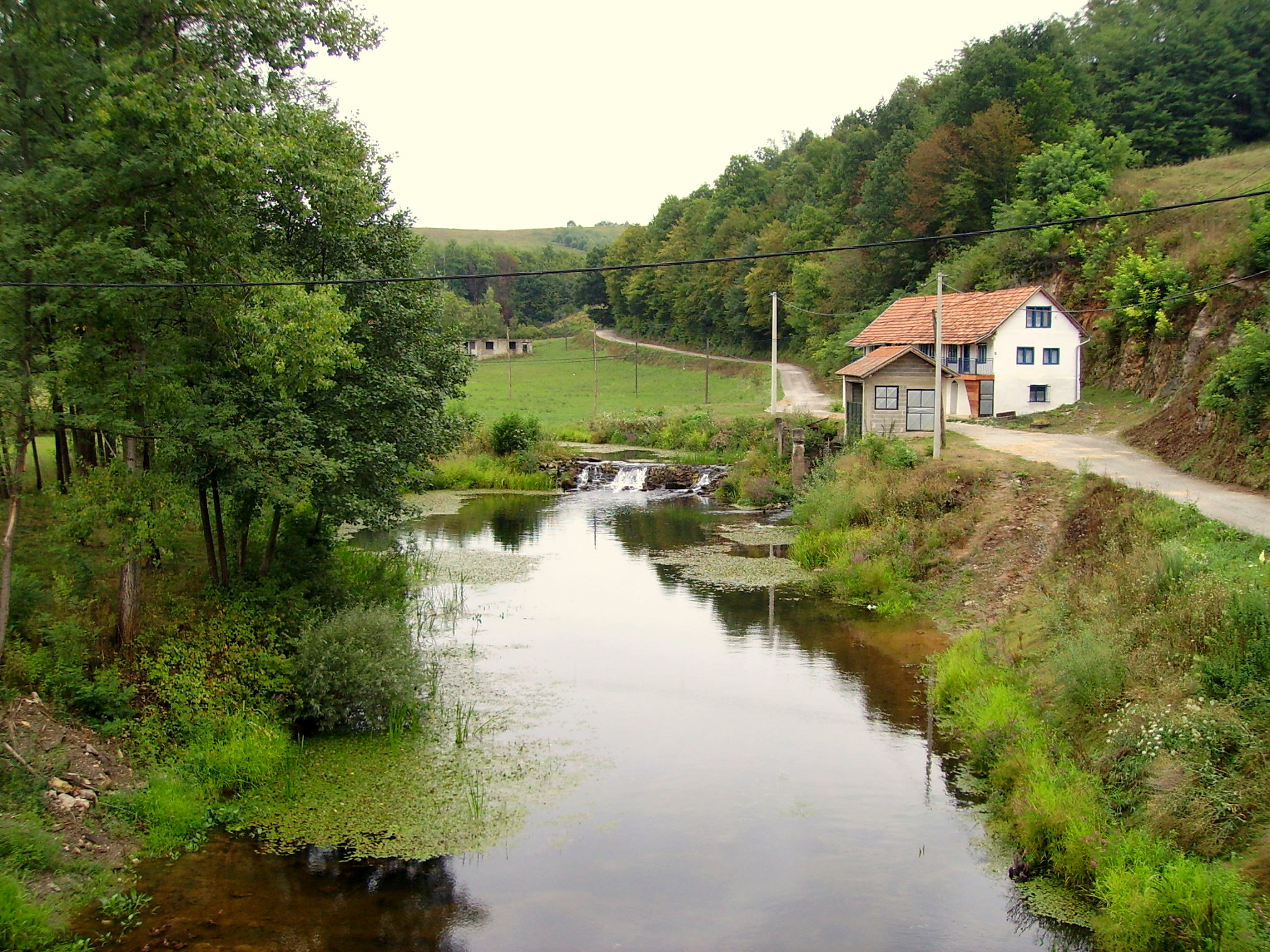
- Glina in Maljevac

Location
- Countries: Croatia; Bosnia and Herzegovina

Physical characteristics
- Mouth
  - location: Kupa
  - coordinates: 45°26′06″N 16°07′18″E
- Length: 112.2 km (69.7 mi)
- Basin size: 1,427 km^{2} (551 sq mi)

Basin features
- Progression: Kupa→ Sava→ Danube→ Black Sea

Glina is a river in central Croatia and Bosnia and Herzegovina, a right tributary of Kupa. It is 112 kilometres (70 mi) long and its basin covers an area of 1,427 square kilometres (551 sq mi).

Glina rises in the mountainous forested areas of Kordun, northeast of Slunj, near the village of Glinsko Vrelo (lit. "the source of Glina"). It flows north before turning east near the village of Veljunska Glina. As it reaches the village of Maljevac, it touches the border of Bosnia and Herzegovina (north of Velika Kladuša), whose path it forms (roughly) for about 18 km (11 mi).

It takes the waters of the Kladušnica river from the right northeast of Miljkovići and south of Gejkovac, and continues to the east. It receives the waters of the Crni potok from the left, south of the village of Crni Potok. Near the villages of Katinovac and Poljana it receives the Glinica from the right and turns northeast, where it passes by Topusko.

Near Donje Selište it receives the waters of the Buzeta from the right, and afterwards it finally reaches the eponymous town of Glina. Near the village of Prekopa it receives the Maja from the right.

At the village of Marinbrod it turns north, and flows into the river Kupa southwest of Slana, at 45.434895°N 16.12178°E.
