= Cvitović =

Cvitović may refer to:

- Cvitović, Bosnia and Herzegovina, a village near Jajce, Bosnia
- Cvitović, Croatia, a village near Slunj, Croatia
