= Tržić =

Tržić may refer to:

- Tržić Primišljanski, a village in Croatia
- Tržić Tounjski, a village in Croatia
