= Točak =

Točak may refer to:

- Radomir Mihajlović Točak, a Serbian rock musician
- Točak, Croatia, a village near Slunj
