= Primišlje =

Primišlje may refer to:

- Donje Primišlje, a village in Croatia
- Gornje Primišlje, a village in Croatia
- Mjesto Primišlje, a village in Croatia
