= Perjasica =

- Village
- Location of Perjasica in Croatia
- Coordinates: 45°17′35″N 15°27′54″E
- Country: Croatia
- County: Karlovac County
- Municipality: Barilović

Area
  - Total: 5.9 km^{2} (2.3 sq mi)
- Elevation: 220 m (720 ft)

Population (2021)
  - Total: 11
  - Density: 1.9/km^{2} (4.8/sq mi)
- Time zone: UTC+1 (CET)
  - Summer (DST): UTC+2 (CEST)
- Postal codes: 47252 Barilović
- Area code: (+385) 47

Perjasica is a village in central Croatia, in the municipality of Barilović, Karlovac County. It is alternately known as Gornja Perjasica. The village suffered large losses to property and life during World War II and the Croatian War of Independence. Inhabitants returning to the region after the War of Independence faced bureaucratic and legal barriers, leading to a steep decline in post-war population. Limited reinvestment in this area after the war has resulted in few operational public services, with no public transportation options, irregular roads frequently made impassable by snow, and limited medical access.

== History ==
Beginning on 5 July 1942, the Battle of Primišlje took place. 500 Partisans from Perjasica and 700 from Tobolić laid siege to Primišlje. This included the 1st and 2nd brigade of the First Kordun Detachment and the 1st and 4th brigade of the 3rd battalion of the Second Kordun Detachment. On the 12th, 2 Ustaša companies came to their rescue.

Beginning on the 19th, the Battle of Tržić took place between Kamenica and Tržić Tounjski. An army of Partisans of the Second Kordun Detachment carried out an attack from Tobolić with 700, Popovići by the Vrelo Mrežnice and Perjasica with 500, and Drežnica with 250, on the pontoon bridge across the Mrežnica by Juzbašići, with the goal of destroying the bridge and disarming the Croatian forces in Tržić. The bridge was guarded by the 3rd Regiment of the Second Domobran Division. Croatia called in reinforcements from Karlovac, which failed to penetrate to Juzbašići. Battles continued with 6 waves of Domobran attacks until the 23rd, when the Partisan army took Tržić and disarmed their opponents, taking captives and transporting them to Tobolić, including Ivan Stipac, Domobran commander in Ogulin. Across the river, the Domobrani of Primišlje retreated to Slunj. After Tržić was taken, the Partisans dismantled the pontoon bridge and destroyed the railway bridge (under repair at the time). The village was completely burned. Because the area was in Zone III, the Italians could only offer artillery support, which they did while the Partisans took Kamenica.

== Demographics ==
In 1890, the obćina of Perjasica (court at Perjasica), with an area of 111 square kilometres (43 mi^{2}), belonged to the kotar of Vojnić (Vojnić electoral district but Krnjak court) in the županija of Modruš-Rieka (Ogulin court and financial board). There were 686 houses, with a population of 3945 (lowest in Vojnić kotar): 1981 male and 1964 female. All were Croatian or Serbian speakers. The majority were Eastern Orthodox, but 102 were Catholic. Its 29 villages were divided for taxation purposes into 6 porezne obćine, under the Slunj office.

According to the 2011 census, the village of Perjasica has 17 inhabitants. This represents 14.66% of its pre-war population according to the 1991 census.

The 1991 census recorded that 83.62% of the village population were ethnic Serbs (97/116), 7.76% were ethic Croats (9/116) and 8.62% were of other ethnic origin (10/116).

Historical population 1857–2011
v

population	254	242	261	239	292	332	321	360	247	279	229	184	137	116	34	17
	1857	1869	1880	1890	1900	1910	1921	1931	1948	1953	1961	1971	1981	1991	2001	2011

Sources: Croatian Bureau of Statistics publications

== Governance ==
On 1 January 1893, Mateško Selo was annexed by Generalski Stol obćina, having formerly been under Perjasica obćina.

== Infrastructure ==
In 1913, there were 6 gendarmeries in Vojnić kotar: Barilović, Krnjak, Krstinja, Perjasica, Vojnić and Vukmanić.

== Sights ==
- Memorial to the victims of fascism and fallen partisans

== Bibliography ==
- Trgo, Fabijan, ed. (1964). Zbornik dokumenata i podataka o Narodno-oslobodilačkom ratu Jugoslovenskih naroda. Vol. V, 32.
