= Popovac =

Popovac may refer to:

== Places ==
=== Bosnia and Herzegovina ===
- Popovac (Čelinac), a village

=== Croatia ===
- Popovac, Osijek-Baranja County, a village and municipality in Croatia
- Popovac, Sisak-Moslavina County, a village near Novska
- Popovac, Virovitica-Podravina County, a village near Voćin
- Donji Popovac a village in Karlovac County
- Gornji Popovac, a village in Karlovac County
- Trnovitički Popovac, a village in Bjelovar-Bilogora County

=== Serbia ===
- Popovac (Niš), a village
- Popovac (Paraćin), a village
- Popovac (Veliko Gradište), a village
- Veliki Popovac, a village

== People ==
- Ismet Popovac (1902–1943), Bosnian Muslim lawyer and physician
