= Drežnica, Croatia =

Drežnica
- Village
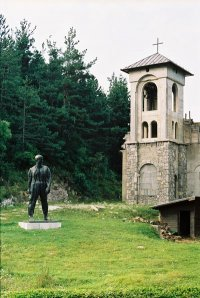
- The Serbian Orthodox Church of the Nativity of the Theotokos

- Location within Croatia
- Coordinates: 45.13629°N 15.09041°E
- Country: Croatia
- County: Karlovac

Area
  - Total: 138.8 km^{2} (53.6 sq mi)
- Elevation: 465 m (1,526 ft)

Population (2021)
  - Total: 356
  - Density: 2.56/km^{2} (6.64/sq mi)
- Time zone: UTC+1 (CET)
  - Summer (DST): UTC+2 (CEST)
- Postal code: 47313 Drežnica
- Area code: +385 047

Drežnica is a village in Croatia near the town of Ogulin.

During the SFR Yugoslavia era, it was known as Partizanska Drežnica due to the village having a Yugoslav Partisan base during the Second World War.

== Climate ==
Between 1994 and 2013, the highest temperature recorded at the local weather station was 34.5 °C (94.1 °F), on 13 August 2003. The coldest temperature was −27.0 °C (−16.6 °F), on 31 January 2003.

== History ==
Serbs migrated to Drežnica in the 17th century. In 1827, there was a parish at the Gomirje Monastery, served by Fr. Simeon Radulović. In 1842, an Orthodox church called the Church of the Nativity of the Theotokos was built. During World War II, it was burned, but it has since been restored. Mijat Stojanović wrote that the landscape in Drežnica is "very rocky, but there is beautiful forest and fertile land."

=== WWII ===
==== 1941 ====
In May 1941, the Ustaša government began targeting known and suspected JRZ members with arrests. The prominent JRZ members in Drežnica at the time were Milan Tatalović, Filip Tatalović Dušan Maravić, Đuro Tomić and Branko Lončar.

In late June or early July 1941, the priest in Drežnica was arrested. In early July, he had not yet been sent away. As of a 15 July document, all he had been sent to a concentration camp.

In July, the Ustaše ordered a number of villagers from Drežnica and its surroundings to appear in court in Ogulin to pay a fine for illegal logging, threatening them with a sentenced of 14 days of forced logging but only 1 day if they work hard. Some of the more naïve villagers appeared in Ogulin, where they were liquidated.

A 2 July was issued order for all Velike župe, including that of Modruš (with seat in Ogulin), to make room for 2500 Slovenes each, who were to occupy the homes of 2500 Serbs, to be deported to the GMS, prioritising businessmen and merchants. Drežnica was to accommodate 500 Slovenes. As of mid-July, there were not enough empty Serb homes to accommodate the exchange.

In the context of deportations of families to the GMS through Sisak concentration camp during the planned Slovene-Serb ethnic exchange, the Ustaše tried to carry out a deportation on 2 August, but found no one except for a 12 year old boy, Predrag Tomić, who was playing with 7 others on the street. As the Ustaše approached, he was the only one who did not flee, but they killed him.

==== 1942 ====
Beginning on 19 June 1942, the Battle of Tržić took place between Kamenica and Tržić Tounjski. An army of Partisans of the Second Kordun Detachment carried out an attack from Tobolić with 700, Popovići by the Vrelo Mrežnice and Perjasica with 500, and Drežnica with 250, on the pontoon bridge across the Mrežnica by Juzbašići, with the goal of destroying the bridge and disarming the Croatian forces in Tržić. The bridge was guarded by the 3rd Regiment of the Second Domobran Division. Croatia called in reinforcements from Karlovac, which failed to penetrate to Juzbašići. Battles continued with 6 waves of Domobran attacks until the 23rd, when the Partisan army took Tržić and disarmed their opponents, taking captives and transporting them to Tobolić. Across the river, the Domobrani of Primišlje retreated to Slunj. After Tržić was taken, the Partisans dismantled the pontoon bridge and destroyed the railway bridge (under repair at the time). The village was completely burned. Because the area was in Zone III, the Italians could only offer artillery support, which they did while the Partisans took Kamenica.

On 11 July, 9 airplanes bombed Drežnica, at the time under Partisan control, on the day of one of their meetings. About 160 deaths were reported.

During World War II in Drežnica, there was a strong People's Liberation Movement with the headquarters of the General Staff of Croatia and Partisan hospital no. 7 established in 1942. People from Kordun, Banija, Lika, Žumberak and Slovenia were treated there. There is a memorial ossuary located there today as during the war, Drežnica had over 1000 casualties.

== Demographics ==
In 1895, the obćina of Drežnica (court at Grede), with an area of 176 square kilometres (68 mi^{2}), belonged to the kotar of Novi (Novi court but Selce electoral district) in the Modruš-Rieka županija (Ogulin court and financial board). There were 478 houses, with a population of 4127. Its 19 villages and 15 hamlets were encompassed for taxation purposes by a single porezna obćina, under the Bakar office.

According to the 2011 census, Drežnica had 516 inhabitants.

== Infrastructure ==
=== Forestry ===
The forestry offices of Ogulin srez were in Ogulin, Drežnica and Jasenak.

=== Roads ===
An old road used to run from Vitunj over Lumbarda mountain through Bjelsko (by Potok Musulinski) and Gvozd to Drežnica, and from there to Ledenica and Bribir.

=== Security ===
In 1913, there were 8 gendarmeries in Delnice kotar: Ogulin, Drežnica, Generalski Stol, Jasenak, Saborsko, Josipdol, Modruš and Plaški.

== Notable people ==
- NBA player Pete Maravich's paternal grandparents immigrated from Drežnica to the United States.

== Bibliography ==
- Trgo, Fabijan, ed. (1964). Zbornik dokumenata i podataka o Narodno-oslobodilačkom ratu Jugoslovenskih naroda. Vol. V, 32.
