= Slunjčica, Karlovac County =

Slunjčica
- Village
- Location within Croatia
- Coordinates: 45°04′N 15°35′E
- Country: Croatia
- County: Karlovac County
- City: Slunj

Area
  - Total: 44.9 km^{2} (17.3 sq mi)

Population (2021)
  - Total: 3
  - Density: 0.067/km^{2} (0.17/sq mi)
- Time zone: UTC+1 (CET)
  - Summer (DST): UTC+2 (CEST)
- Postal code: 47240
- Area code: +385 047

Slunjčica is a village in Croatia, under the Slunj township, in Karlovac County. It is located at the source of the Slunjčica river.
