= Novo Selo, Karlovac County =

Novo Selo, Karlovac County may refer to:

- Novo Selo, Slunj
- Novo Selo Bosiljevsko
