= Donje Primišlje =

- Village
- Location within Croatia
- Coordinates: 45°12′N 15°28′E
- Country: Croatia
- County: Karlovac County
- City: Slunj

Area
  - Total: 18.9 km^{2} (7.3 sq mi)

Population (2021)
  - Total: 22
  - Density: 1.2/km^{2} (3.0/sq mi)
- Time zone: UTC+1 (CET)
  - Summer (DST): UTC+2 (CEST)
- Postal code: 47240
- Area code: +385 047

Donje Primišlje is a village in Croatia, under the Slunj township, in Karlovac County.

== History ==
On 12 April 1941, a group of 700 soldiers of the Royal Yugoslav Army launched an attack on Slunj from Primišlje in an attempt to penetrate further towards Bosnia, but after 6 hours the attack on Slunj failed. Wehrmacht forces entered Slunj at the behest of the Ustaša administration of Slunj in the evening, while the Luftwaffe bombed Yugoslav positions. A large number of soldiers were captured, and of those about 30 officers and 100 soldiers pledged allegiance to the NDH. Throughout that same day, a large number of Croat former Yugoslav soldiers from Bihać and Korenica had been making the same pledge. German soldiers returned to Karlovac that evening with 2 captive Yugoslav generals.

Beginning on 19 June 1942, the Battle of Tržić took place between Kamenica and Tržić Tounjski. An army of Partisans of the Second Kordun Detachment carried out an attack from Tobolić with 700, Popovići by the Vrelo Mrežnice and Perjasica with 500, and Drežnica with 250, on the pontoon bridge across the Mrežnica by Juzbašići, with the goal of destroying the bridge and disarming the Croatian forces in Tržić. The bridge was guarded by the 3rd Regiment of the Second Domobran Division. Croatia called in reinforcements from Karlovac, which failed to penetrate to Juzbašići. Battles continued until the 23rd, when the Partisan army took Tržić and disarmed their opponents, taking captives and transporting them to Tobolić, including Ivan Stipac, Domobran commander in Ogulin. Across the river, the Domobrani of Primišlje retreated to Slunj. After Tržić was taken, the Partisans dismantled the pontoon bridge and destroyed the railway bridge (under repair at the time). The village was completely burned. Because the area was in Zone III, the Italians could only offer artillery support, which they did while the Partisans took Kamenica.

== Bibliography ==
- Trgo, Fabijan, ed. (1964). Zbornik dokumenata i podataka o Narodno-oslobodilačkom ratu Jugoslovenskih naroda. Vol. V, 32.
