= Bandino Selo =

Village in Croatia

- Village
- Bandino Selo
- Location within Croatia
- Coordinates: 45°13′N 15°35′E
- Country: Croatia
- County: Karlovac County
- City: Slunj

Area
  - Total: 1.1 km^{2} (0.42 sq mi)
- Elevation: 202 m (663 ft)

Population (2021)
  - Total: 1
  - Density: 0.91/km^{2} (2.4/sq mi)
- Time zone: UTC+1 (CET)
  - Summer (DST): UTC+2 (CEST)
- Postal code: 47240
- Area code: +385 047

Bandino Selo is a village in Croatia, under the Slunj township, in Karlovac County. It is located 92 km away from the national capital, Zagreb. Until the territorial reorganization in Croatia, Bandino Selo was part of the old municipality of Slunj. As an independent settlement, Bandino Selo has existed since the 2001 census. It was created by separating a part of the settlement of Crno Vrelo.

== Population ==
At the time of the 2001 census, the settlement had 7 inhabitants and 3 family households. According to the 2021 census, the settlement has just 1 inhabitant.

Village of Bandino Selo: Population trends 1857–2021
v

population	241	130	134	128	87	111	96	119	58	48	47	37			7	6	1
	1857	1869	1880	1890	1900	1910	1921	1931	1948	1953	1961	1971	1981	1991	2001	2011	2021

Note:In 2001, it was created by separation from the settlement of Crno Vrelo. Expressed as a settlement since 1948, and as a part of the settlement since 1953. In 1981 and 1991, the data is contained in the settlement of Crno Vrelo. Sources: Croatian Bureau of Statistics publications
