= Kutanja, Croatia =

Kutanja
- Village
- Location within Croatia
- Coordinates: 45°10′N 15°36′E
- Country: Croatia
- County: Karlovac County
- City: Slunj

Population (2011)
  - Total: 2
- Time zone: UTC+1 (CET)
  - Summer (DST): UTC+2 (CEST)
- Postal code: 47240
- Area code: +385 047

Kutanja is a village in Croatia, under the Slunj township, in Karlovac County.
