= Grobnik =

Grobnik may refer to:

- Grobnik, Primorje-Gorski Kotar County, Croatia, a village near Rijeka
  - Grobnik Castle, a fortification in the village
  - Grobnik Field, site of the legendary Battle of Grobnik Field
  - Automotodrom Grobnik, a motorsport race track in the same field
  - Grobničko Polje Airfield, an airfield in the same field
- Grobnik, Istria County, a village near Pićan, Croatia
- Grobnik, Karlovac County, a village near Slunj, Croatia
- Slats Grobnik, fictional columnist contributor
