= Miljevac, Croatia =

Miljevac
- Village
- Location within Croatia
- Coordinates: 45°07′N 15°38′E
- Country: Croatia
- County: Karlovac County
- City: Slunj

Area
  - Total: 1.6 km^{2} (0.62 sq mi)

Population (2021)
  - Total: 10
  - Density: 6.2/km^{2} (16/sq mi)
- Time zone: UTC+1 (CET)
  - Summer (DST): UTC+2 (CEST)
- Postal code: 47240
- Area code: +385 047

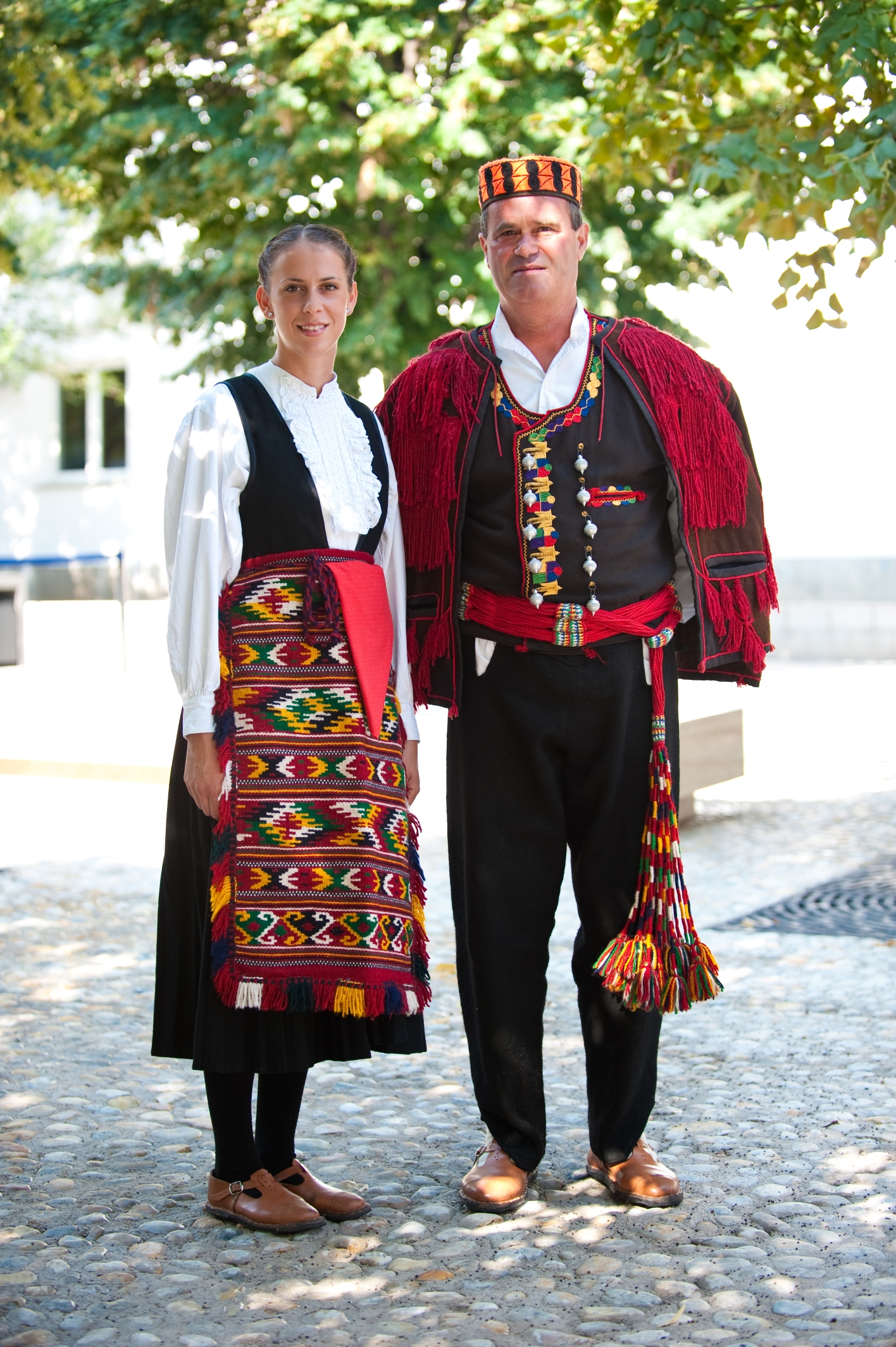
Miljevci Folk Costume

Miljevac is a village in Croatia, under the Slunj township, in Karlovac County.

== History ==
On 21 March 2024 at 14:24 the ŽVOC Karlovac received a call about a wildfire in the area. 4.5 hectares (11 acres) burned by the time it was put out at 16:42 by DVD Slunj.
