= Podmelnica =

- Village
- Location within Croatia
- Coordinates: 45°06′N 15°34′E
- Country: Croatia
- County: Karlovac County
- City: Slunj

Area
  - Total: 4.9 km^{2} (1.9 sq mi)

Population (2021)
  - Total: 155
  - Density: 32/km^{2} (82/sq mi)
- Time zone: UTC+1 (CET)
  - Summer (DST): UTC+2 (CEST)
- Postal code: 47240
- Area code: +385 047

Podmelnica is a village in Croatia, under the Slunj township, in Karlovac County. Surnames in Podmelnica include: Obajdin, Holjevac, Štefanac, Jareb, Oštrina, Begović, Blašković and Bosanac.
