= Gornji Furjan =

- Village
- Location within Croatia
- Coordinates: 45°03′N 15°40′E
- Country: Croatia
- County: Karlovac County
- City: Slunj

Area
  - Total: 5.1 km^{2} (2.0 sq mi)

Population (2021)
  - Total: 57
  - Density: 11/km^{2} (29/sq mi)
- Time zone: UTC+1 (CET)
  - Summer (DST): UTC+2 (CEST)
- Postal code: 47240
- Area code: +385 047

Gornji Furjan is a village in Croatia, under the Slunj township, in Karlovac County.

== History ==
On 25 March 2022 at 17:09 the ŽVOC Karlovac received a call about a wildfire in the area. 15 hectares (37 acres) burned by the time it was put out at 20:15 by DVD Slunj and DVD Rakovica.
