= Sastavak =

- Village
- Location within Croatia
- Coordinates: 45°03′N 15°41′E
- Country: Croatia
- County: Karlovac County
- City: Slunj

Area
  - Total: 2.8 km^{2} (1.1 sq mi)

Population (2021)
  - Total: 10
  - Density: 3.6/km^{2} (9.2/sq mi)
- Time zone: UTC+1 (CET)
  - Summer (DST): UTC+2 (CEST)
- Postal code: 47240
- Area code: +385 047

Sastavak is a village in Croatia, under the Slunj township, in Karlovac County.

== History ==
Upon the conclusion of the Treaty of Passarowitz in 1718, the fortress of Furjan was to be transferred to the Habsburg monarchy.

== Bibliography ==
- Roksandić, Drago (2007-10-01). "Posavska krajina/granica od 1718. do 1739. godine". Ekonomska i ekohistorija: časopis za gospodarsku povijest i povijest okoliša (in Serbo-Croatian) (3): 62–82. eISSN 1849-0190.
- Pelidija, Enes (1989). Bosanski ejalet od Karlovačkog do Požarevačkog mira 1699 - 1718 (in Serbo-Croatian). Sarajevo. pp. 237–259.
