= Church of the Nativity of the Theotokos, Drežnica =

Serbian Orthodox church in Drežnica, Croatia

Church of the Nativity of the Theotokos
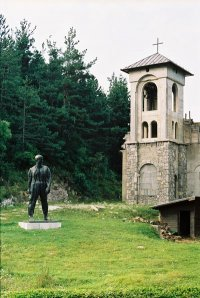
- Church of the Nativity of the Theotokos
- 45°8′12″N 15°5′27″E
- Location: Drežnica
- Country: Croatia
- Denomination: Serbian Orthodox

History
- Dedication: Nativity of the Virgin

Architecture
- Completed: 1842

Church of the Nativity of the Theotokos is a Serbian Orthodox church in Drežnica, Croatia.

== See also ==
- List of Serbian Orthodox churches in Croatia
