= Donja Visočka =

- Village
- Location within Croatia
- Coordinates: 45°15′N 15°30′E
- Country: Croatia
- County: Karlovac County
- City: Slunj

Area
  - Total: 2.7 km^{2} (1.0 sq mi)

Population (2021)
  - Total: 4
  - Density: 1.5/km^{2} (3.8/sq mi)
- Time zone: UTC+1 (CET)
  - Summer (DST): UTC+2 (CEST)
- Postal code: 47240
- Area code: 047

Donja Visočka is a village in Croatia, under the Slunj township, in Karlovac County.

== History ==
On 25 March 2022 at 12:04 the ŽVOC Karlovac received a call about a wildfire in the area. 650 hectares (1,600 acres) burned by the time it was put out at 2:10 on the 26th by JVP Karlovac and volunteer fire departments of Slunj, Belavići, Zagradci, Belajske Poljice, Siča, Draganići, Generalski Stol, Cerovac Vukmanićki, Rečica Matica, Mahično, Stative Gornje, Gornje Mekušje, Orlovac, Tuškani, Dubravci, Stara Sela, Velika Jelsa, Bukovlje and Hrnetić-Novaki. The fire also burned down one abandoned building.
