= Polje, Croatia =

Polje
- Village
- Location within Croatia
- Coordinates: 45°04′N 15°39′E
- Country: Croatia
- County: Karlovac County
- City: Slunj

Area
  - Total: 2.0 km^{2} (0.77 sq mi)

Population (2021)
  - Total: 28
  - Density: 14/km^{2} (36/sq mi)
- Time zone: UTC+1 (CET)
  - Summer (DST): UTC+2 (CEST)
- Postal code: 47240
- Area code: +385 047

Polje is a village in Croatia, under the Slunj township, in Karlovac County.
