= Jame =

- Village
- Location within Croatia
- Coordinates: 45.083974°N 15.617809°E
- Country: Croatia
- County: Karlovac County
- City: Slunj

Area
  - Total: 3.0 km^{2} (1.2 sq mi)

Population (2021)
  - Total: 21
  - Density: 7.0/km^{2} (18/sq mi)
- Time zone: UTC+1 (CET)
  - Summer (DST): UTC+2 (CEST)
- Postal code: 47240
- Area code: +385 047

Jame is a village in Croatia, under the Slunj township, in Karlovac County.

== Geography ==
The village is located in the interior region of Croatia, within the Karlovac County, which lies between the capital Zagreb and the famous Plitvice Lakes area. It is part of the Slunj municipality, a rural area that includes several small villages scattered across karstic hills and valleys.
