= Gornja Glina =

- Village
- Location within Croatia
- Coordinates: 45°08′N 15°37′E
- Country: Croatia
- County: Karlovac County
- City: Slunj

Area
  - Total: 5.6 km^{2} (2.2 sq mi)

Population (2021)
  - Total: 106
  - Density: 19/km^{2} (49/sq mi)
- Time zone: UTC+1 (CET)
  - Summer (DST): UTC+2 (CEST)
- Postal code: 47240
- Area code: +385 047

Gornja Glina is a village in Croatia, under the Slunj township, in Karlovac County.
