= Dubrave, Slunj =

Dubrave
- Village
- Location within Croatia
- Coordinates: 45°06′N 15°40′E
- Country: Croatia
- County: Karlovac County
- City: Slunj

Area
  - Total: 3.7 km^{2} (1.4 sq mi)

Population (2021)
  - Total: 6
  - Density: 1.6/km^{2} (4.2/sq mi)
- Time zone: UTC+1 (CET)
  - Summer (DST): UTC+2 (CEST)
- Postal code: 47240
- Area code: +385 047

Dubrave is a village in Croatia, under the Slunj township, in Karlovac County.
