= Cvitović, Bosnia and Herzegovina =

Cvitović
- Village
- Location within Bosnia and Herzegovina
- Coordinates: 44°24′N 17°18′E
- Country: Bosnia and Herzegovina
- Entity: Federation of Bosnia and Herzegovina
- Canton: Central Bosnia
- Municipality: Jajce

Area
  - Total: 1.68 sq mi (4.34 km^{2})

Population (2013)
  - Total: 151
  - Density: 90.1/sq mi (34.8/km^{2})
- Time zone: UTC+1 (CET)
  - Summer (DST): UTC+2 (CEST)

Cvitović is a village in the municipality of Jajce, Bosnia and Herzegovina.

== Demographics ==
According to the 2013 census, its population was 151.

Ethnicity in 2013
Ethnicity	Number	Percentage
Bosniaks	85	56.3%
Croats	64	42.4%
other/undeclared	2	1.3%
Total	151	100%
