= Tržić Primišljanski =

- Village
- Location within Croatia
- Coordinates: 45°12′N 15°30′E
- Country: Croatia
- County: Karlovac County
- City: Slunj

Area
  - Total: 14.7 km^{2} (5.7 sq mi)

Population (2021)
  - Total: 9
  - Density: 0.61/km^{2} (1.6/sq mi)
- Time zone: UTC+1 (CET)
  - Summer (DST): UTC+2 (CEST)
- Postal code: 47240
- Area code: +385 047

Tržić Primišljanski is a village in Croatia, under the Slunj township, in Karlovac County. It is near the Blagaj castle.

== History ==
On 21 March 2024 at 16:19 the ŽVOC Karlovac received a call about a wildfire in the area. 50 hectares (120 acres) burned by the time it was put out at 21:19 by DVD Slunj.
