= Novo Selo, Slunj =

Novo Selo
- Village
- Interactive map of Novo Selo
- Location within Croatia
- Coordinates: 45°05′N 15°35′E
- Country: Croatia
- County: Karlovac County
- Town: Slunj

Area
  - Total: 1.7 km^{2} (0.66 sq mi)

Population (2021)
  - Total: 52
  - Density: 31/km^{2} (79/sq mi)
- Time zone: UTC+1 (CET)
  - Summer (DST): UTC+2 (CEST)
- Postal code: 47240
- Area code: +385 047

Novo Selo is a village in Croatia, administratively located in the Town of Slunj, in Karlovac County. The etymology of the village comes from Slavic languages meaning new village, Novo Selo.
