= Glinsko Vrelo =

- Village
- Location within Croatia
- Coordinates: 45°09′N 15°36′E
- Country: Croatia
- County: Karlovac County
- City: Slunj

Area
  - Total: 3.3 km^{2} (1.3 sq mi)

Population (2021)
  - Total: 39
  - Density: 12/km^{2} (31/sq mi)
- Time zone: UTC+1 (CET)
  - Summer (DST): UTC+2 (CEST)
- Postal code: 47240
- Area code: +385 047

Glinsko Vrelo is a village in Croatia, under the Slunj township, in Karlovac County.
