= Grobnik, Karlovac County =

Grobnik
- Village
- Location within Croatia
- Coordinates: 45°14′N 15°37′E
- Country: Croatia
- County: Karlovac County
- City: Slunj

Area
  - Total: 2.1 km^{2} (0.81 sq mi)

Population (2021)
  - Total: 10
  - Density: 4.8/km^{2} (12/sq mi)
- Time zone: UTC+1 (CET)
  - Summer (DST): UTC+2 (CEST)
- Postal code: 47240
- Area code: +385 047

Grobnik is a village in Croatia, under the Slunj township, in Karlovac County.
