= Poljana, Velika Kladuša =

Poljana
- Village
- Location within Bosnia and Herzegovina
- Coordinates: 45.218233°N 15.903607°E
- Country: Bosnia and Herzegovina
- Entity: Federation of Bosnia and Herzegovina
- Canton: Una-Sana
- Municipality: Velika Kladuša

Area
  - Total: 5.25 sq mi (13.59 km^{2})

Population (2013)
  - Total: 1,027
  - Density: 195.7/sq mi (75.57/km^{2})
- Time zone: UTC+1 (CET)
  - Summer (DST): UTC+2 (CEST)

Poljana is a village in the municipality of Velika Kladuša, Bosnia and Herzegovina.

== Demographics ==
According to the 2013 census, its population was 1,027.

Ethnicity in 2013
Ethnicity	Number	Percentage
Bosniaks	823	80.1%
Croats	16	1.6%
Serbs	3	0.3%
other/undeclared	185	18.0%
Total	1027	100%
