= Slunjčica =

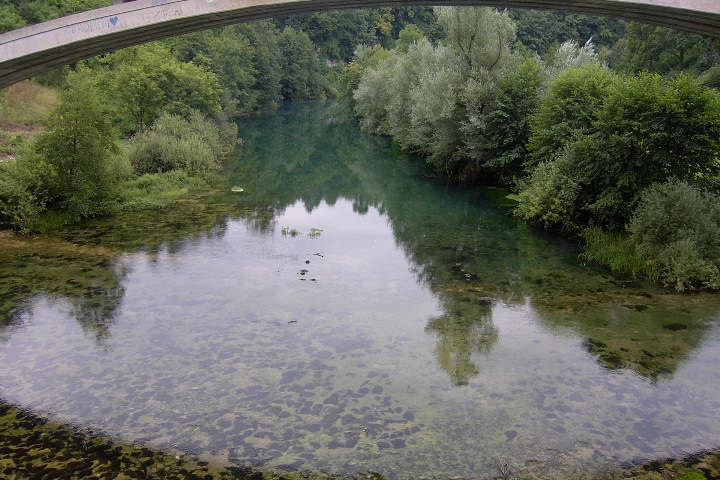
- Slunjčica

Location
- Country: Croatia

Physical characteristics
- Mouth
  - location: Korana
  - coordinates: 45.1211°N 15.5861°E

Basin features
- Progression: Korana→ Kupa→ Sava→ Danube→ Black Sea

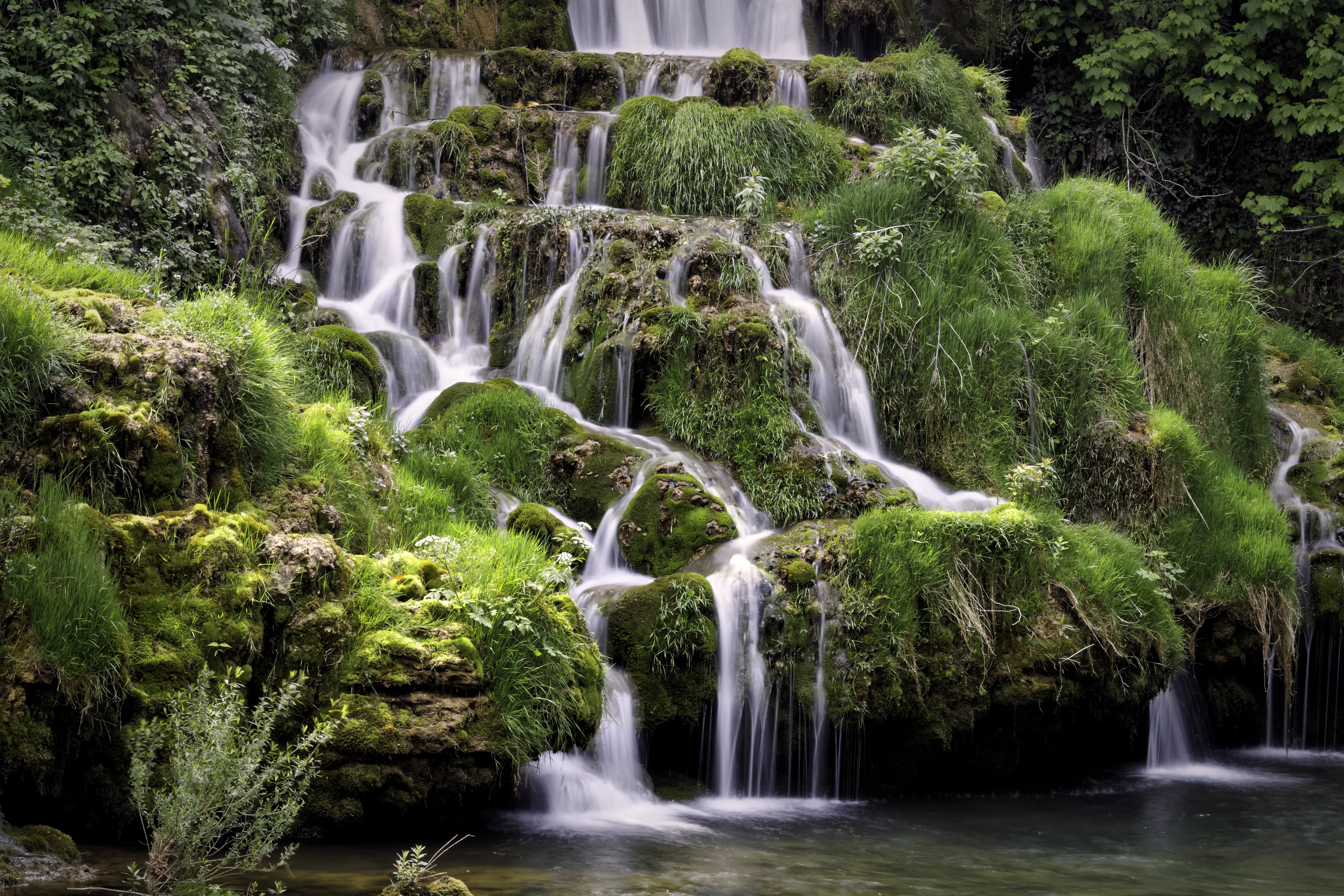
Waterfalls on the Slunjčica

The Slunjčica (locally also called Slušnica) is a river, which flows through the Kordun region in central Croatia. It partly flows underground through porous karst (limestone soil) and surfaces in the vicinity of the city of Slunj. At Rastoke the Slunjčica leads into the river Korana, which reaches this point after passing the Plitvice Lakes National Park. The city of Slunj bears its name from this river. Due to its underground course the Slunjčica river has a quite cold temperature even during summer and the nearby situated towns use it as drinking water.
