= Miljkovići, Velika Kladuša =

Village in Bosnia and Herzegovina

Miljkovići
- Village
- Interactive map of Miljkovići
- Location within Bosnia and Herzegovina
- Coordinates: 45.197782°N 15.813128°E
- Country: Bosnia and Herzegovina
- Entity: Federation of Bosnia and Herzegovina
- Canton: Una-Sana
- Municipality: Velika Kladuša

Area
  - Total: 1.47 sq mi (3.81 km^{2})

Population (2013)
  - Total: 2,517
  - Density: 1,710/sq mi (661/km^{2})
- Time zone: UTC+1 (CET)
  - Summer (DST): UTC+2 (CEST)

Miljkovići is a village in the municipality of Velika Kladuša, Bosnia and Herzegovina. It is located just northeast of Velika Kladuša town.

== Demographics ==
According to the 2013 census, its population was 2,517.

Ethnicity in 2013
Ethnicity	Number	Percentage
Bosniaks	2,114	84.0%
Croats	38	1.5%
Serbs	3	0.1%
other/undeclared	362	14.4%
Total	2,517	100%
