= Gornje Primišlje =

- Village
- Location within Croatia
- Coordinates: 45°09′N 15°29′E
- Country: Croatia
- County: Karlovac County
- City: Slunj

Area
  - Total: 22.7 km^{2} (8.8 sq mi)

Population (2021)
  - Total: 7
  - Density: 0.31/km^{2} (0.80/sq mi)
- Time zone: UTC+1 (CET)
  - Summer (DST): UTC+2 (CEST)
- Postal code: 47240
- Area code: +385 047

Gornje Primišlje is a village in Croatia, under the Slunj township, in Karlovac County.

== History ==
On 12 April 1941, a group of 700 soldiers of the Royal Yugoslav Army launched an attack on Slunj from Primišlje in an attempt to penetrate further towards Bosnia, but after 6 hours the attack on Slunj failed. Wehrmacht forces entered Slunj at the behest of the Ustaša administration of Slunj in the evening, while the Luftwaffe bombed Yugoslav positions. A large number of soldiers were captured, and of those about 30 officers and 100 soldiers pledged allegiance to the NDH. Throughout that same day, a large number of Croat former Yugoslav soldiers from Bihać and Korenica had been making the same pledge. German soldiers returned to Karlovac that evening with 2 captive Yugoslav generals.

In the wake of the executions at Oštarski Stanovi, many Serbs rebelled, and the first shot fired in the region was in Gornje Primišlje on 3 August 1941. On the 15th, Communists and Spanish Civil War veterans Stjepan Milašinčić and Izidor Štrok arrived in Gornje Primišlje from Karlovac to organise the rebellion, and on the 17th, Slunj's first Partisan detachment was formed here.

== Demographics ==
In 1895, the obćina of Primišlje (court at Primišlje Gornje), with an area of 189 square kilometres (73 mi^{2}), belonged to the kotar of Slunj (Slunj court but Plaški electoral district) in the županija of Modruš-Rieka (Ogulin court and financial board). There were 1067 houses, with a population of 6936. Its 12 villages and 89 hamlets were divided for taxation purposes into 6 porezne obćine, under the Slunj office.

== Notable natives and residents ==
- Svetozar Livada (1928 - 2022) - a Serb philosopher, sociologist, historian, politician and demographer
