= Križ Kamenica =

- Village
- Interactive map of Križ Kamenica
- Location within Croatia
- Coordinates: 45.04501°N 15.13294°E
- Country: Croatia
- County: Lika-Senj
- Municipality: Brinje

Area
  - Total: 5.0 sq mi (13.0 km^{2})

Population (2021)
  - Total: 167
  - Density: 33.3/sq mi (12.8/km^{2})
- Time zone: UTC+1 (CET)
  - Summer (DST): UTC+2 (CEST)

Križ Kamenica is a village in Brinje, Croatia. It is connected by the D23 road.
