= Mrežnica =

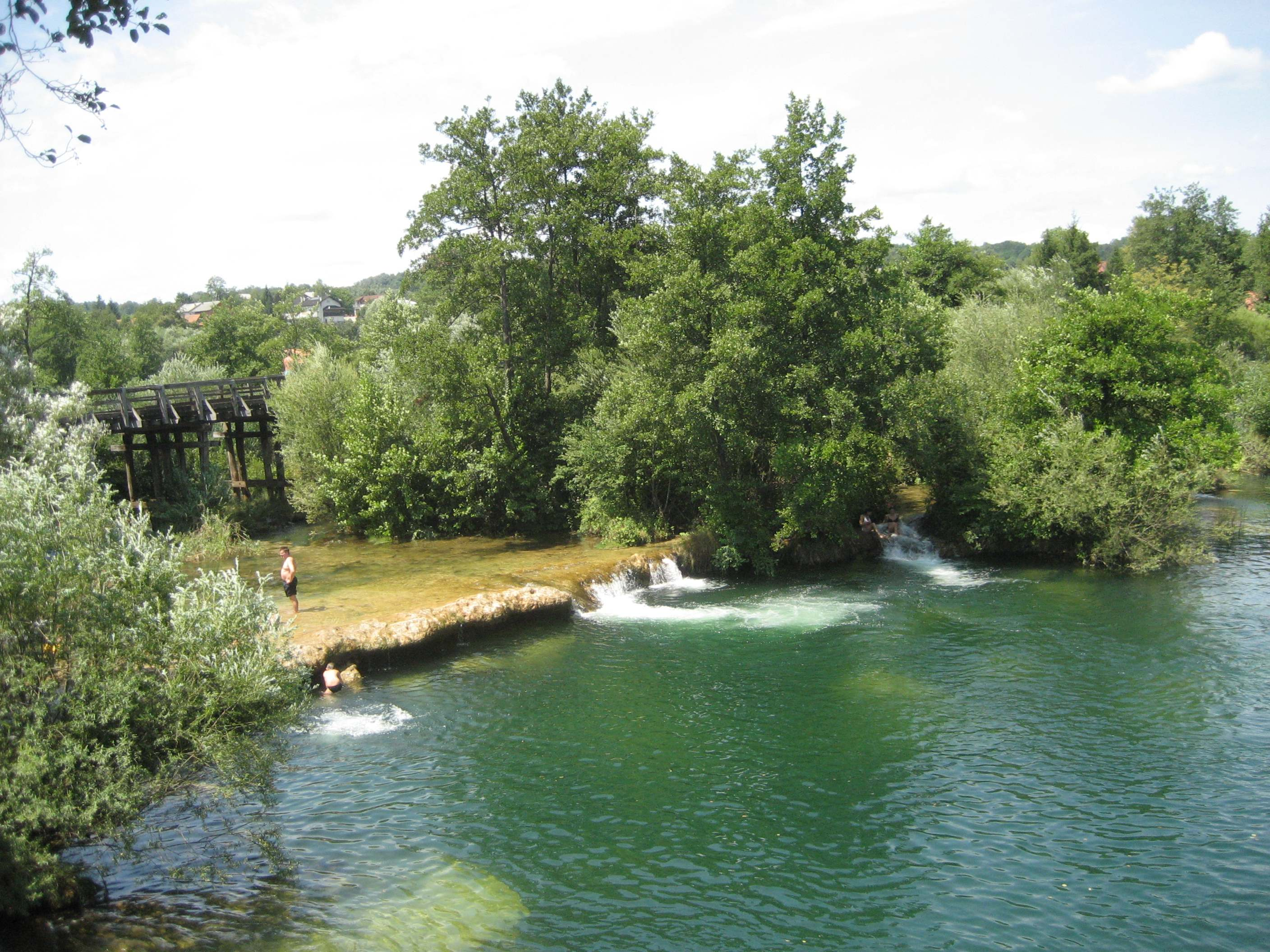

Location
- Country: Croatia

Physical characteristics
- Source
  - coordinates: 45.0902°N 15.4959°E
- Mouth
  - location: Korana
  - coordinates: 45.4657°N 15.5654°E
- Length: 63 km (39 mi)
- Basin size: 64 km^{2} (25 sq mi)

Basin features
- Progression: Korana→ Kupa→ Sava→ Danube→ Black Sea

The Mrežnica (pronounced [mreʒnit͡sa]) is a river in Karlovac County, Croatia. It is 63 kilometres (39 mi) long and its basin covers an area of 64 square kilometres (25 sq mi).

Mrežnica is considered special due to its large number of waterfalls, totalling 93. It rises in Kordun, west of Slunj, and flows northwards, in parallel to Dobra and Korana, through Generalski Stol and Duga Resa, when it finally flows into the Korana in the south of Karlovac (at Mostanje/Turanj).

The Gojak Hydroelectric Power Plant is a high pressure diversion plant which harnesses the river power of the Ogulinska Dobra and Mrežnica rivers.

== Bibliography ==
- Senta Marić, Ankica; Čepelak, Radovan; Andabaka, Damir (2014). "Rijeka Dobra s pritocima". 13.stručni sastanak laboratorija ovlaštenih za ispitivanje voda [The River Dobra with Tributaries] (in Croatian). Rijeka: Zigo. pp. 61–66.
