= Slunj =

- Town
- Grad Slunj; Town of Slunj
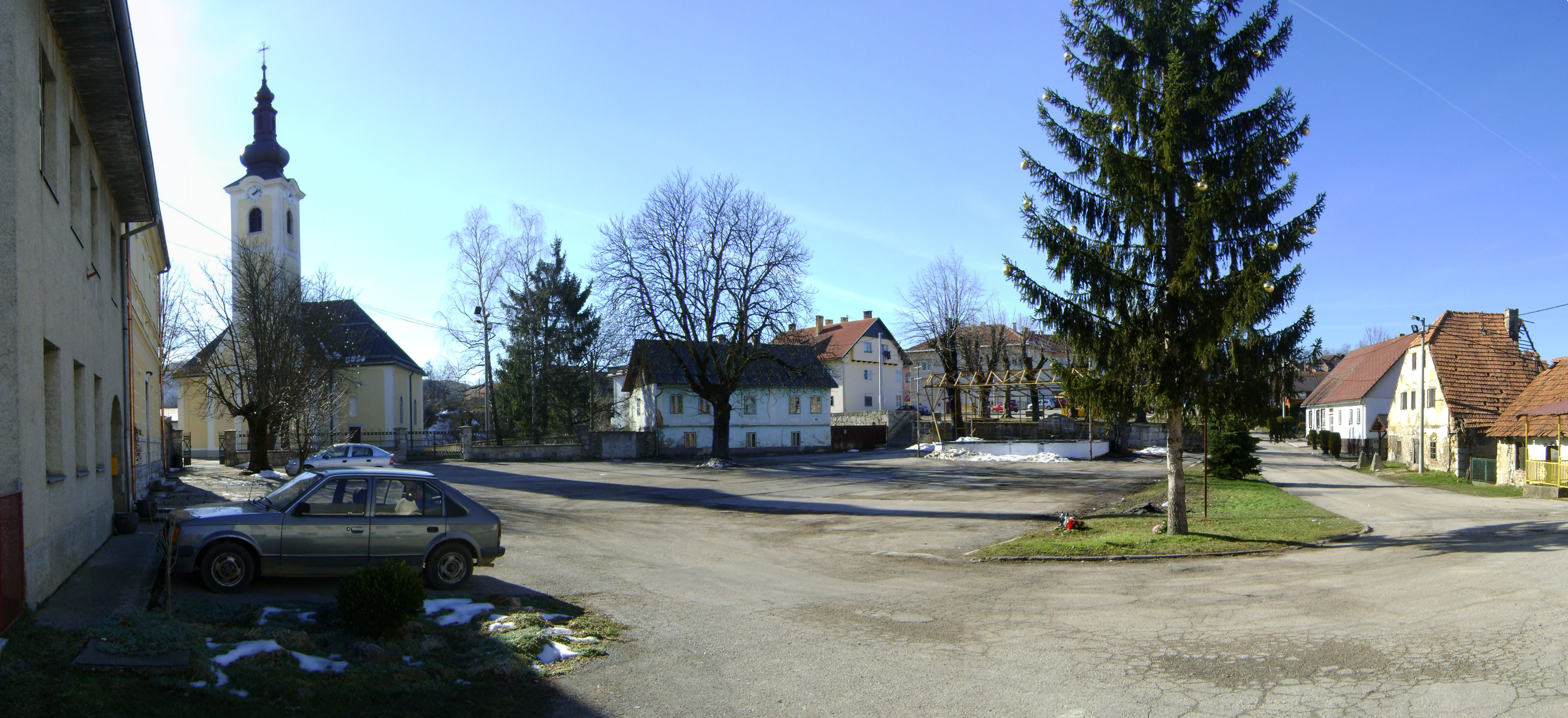
- Zrinski Square in Slunj
- Interactive map of Slunj
- Location of Slunj in Croatia
- Coordinates: 45°06′56″N 15°35′05″E
- Country: Croatia
- Region: Central Croatia (Kordun)
- County: Karlovac County

Government
  - Mayor: Mirjana Puškarić (HDZ)

Area
  - Town: 393.4 km^{2} (151.9 sq mi)
  - Urban: 5.1 km^{2} (2.0 sq mi)
- Elevation: 258 m (846 ft)

Population (2021)
  - Town: 4,224
  - Density: 10.74/km^{2} (27.81/sq mi)
  - Urban: 1,576
  - Urban density: 310/km^{2} (800/sq mi)
- Time zone: UTC+1 (CET)
  - Summer (DST): UTC+2 (CEST)
- Postal code: 47240
- Area code: 047
- Website: slunj.hr

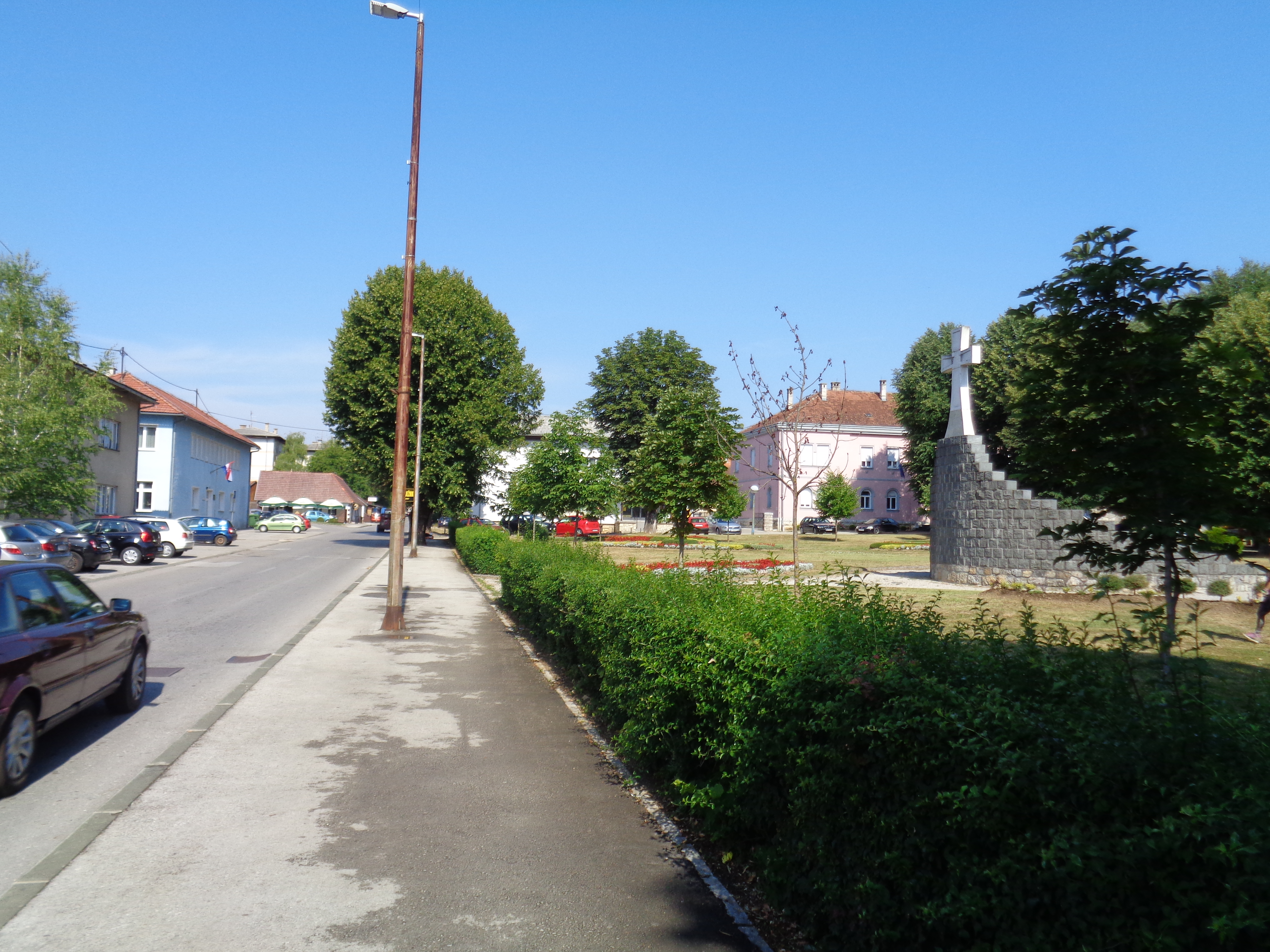
Franjo Tuđman Square in the town center

Slunj is a town in the mountainous part of Central Croatia, located along the important North-South route to the Adriatic Sea between Karlovac and Plitvice Lakes National Park, on the meeting of the rivers Korana and Slunjčica. Slunj has a population of 1,674, with a total of 5,076 people in the municipality (2011) and is the cultural and social center of the region of Kordun in the vicinity to Bosnia and Herzegovina. Administratively, the town is part of Karlovac County. Slunj is an underdeveloped municipality which is statistically classified as part of the First Category Area of Special State Concern by the Government of Croatia.

== Climate ==
Since records began in 1955, the highest temperature recorded at the local weather station was 40.0 °C (104.0 °F), on 4 August 2017. The coldest temperature was −24.0 °C (−11.2 °F), on 16 February 1956.

== History ==
An old fortification of the Frankopans, built during the wars against the Turks, Slovin was first mentioned in the 12th century. The old fort was property of the Frankopan (Hungarian Frangepán) family since the 15th century, joined by an old Franciscan monastery from the same period. Later, this town has been called Slunj. In the 16th century the town was ravaged by the Ottoman wars and turned into a military outpost of the Croatian Military Frontier, but by the end of the 17th century the settlement was rebuilt into the Slunj as it exists today. The castle has been developed to a fortress and served as headquarters for the commanding general of this area (see Stari grad Slunj). After the Treaty of Sistova in 1791 people increasingly began to re-settle in this area.

The town of Slunj was first mentioned in a written document by the chronicler Johann Weikhard von Valvasor who reported about the fortified town of Slunj, a bridge and a mill in 1689. The first illustration of the mills of Rastoke dates back from 1789. It was a copper engraving that has been added to a description by Belsazar Hacquet. At the end of the 19th century, Stjepan Širola wrote the following about this place: "The surroundings of Slunj are downright romantic […]. They are crowned by the magnificent waterfalls of the Slunjčica river by which even not outspoken nature lovers will be captivated. Indeed, Slunj with its romantic surroundings and the silver waterfalls of the Slunjčica represent a true nature gem astonishing even to foreigners."

During the short French governance period from 1809 until 1813, Slunj encountered an economic boom as streets, storage facilities and mills were built and as vineyards and mulberry trees were planted. At this point of time, the Croatian language has become official language of the country. The residence of the former governor general of the French Illyrian Provinces, marshal Auguste de Marmont, still exists.

Until 1918, Slunj (named SZLUIN) was part of the Austrian monarchy (Kingdom of Croatia-Slavonia, Modruš-Rijeka County, after the compromise of 1867), in the Croatian Military Frontier. It was administered by the SZLUINER Grenz-Infanterie-Regiment N°IV before 1881. Slunj became a district capital in the Modruš-Rijeka County in the Kingdom.

=== WWII ===
On 6 April 1941, the Wehrmacht began the Balkans campaign. On 12 April 1941, a group of 700 soldiers of the Royal Yugoslav Army launched an attack on Slunj from Primišlje in an attempt to penetrate further towards Bosnia, but after 6 hours the attack on Slunj failed. Wehrmacht forces entered Slunj at the behest of the Ustaša administration of Slunj in the evening, while the Luftwaffe bombed Yugoslav positions. A large number of soldiers were captured, and of those about 30 officers and 100 soldiers pledged allegiance to the NDH. Throughout that same day, a large number of Croat former Yugoslav soldiers from Bihać and Korenica had been making the same pledge. German soldiers returned to Karlovac that evening with 2 captive Yugoslav generals.

On the Gregorian Easter Sunday of 13 April 1941 at around 9:00, German tanks, trucks and motorcycles, together with Italian bicycle infantry, passed through Slunj, well-received by most of its Croat residents but resented by most of its Serb residents. This became a frequent sight for a week. The German soldiers rarely stopped, with the exception of one unit from France on whom night fell, so they spent the night. The Italian soldiers often stopped frequently in Slunj in mid-April, but gained a poor reputation because of chicken thieving and not paying innkeepers. The Invasion of Yugoslavia only lasted 2–3 days in and around Slunj.

On 22 August 1941, all of Slunj's kotar and općina level members of the HSS formally joined the Ustaša movement. This followed an 8 June 1941 meeting between NDH Minister of People's Economy Lovro Sušić and the representatives of kotar level organs of the HSS.

Initially in April 1941, the Royal Italian Army would take captured Serbs to POW camps in Fascist Italy. But on 7 May 1941, the same day as the Blagaj massacre, an Italian cavalry regiment arrived in Slunj and freed all Serbian captives there. On the 10th, Italian Carabinieri arrived in Slunj and disarmed the Croats in Slunj, Rakovica and Drežnik Grad. Twenty Italian financial servants arrived to act as financial overseers in Slunj kotar. Most of this was in the context of obtaining better territorial concessions in the upcoming delineation of their border with the NDH. This came with the Treaties of Rome on the 18th, in which the Italians obtained a stronger position within the Italian occupation zone but no annexable territory as far inland as Slunj. The Italian Army left Slunj on June 7.

On 1 July 1941, Ante Pavelić founded the Velika župa Modruš with its seat in Ogulin, by merging Ogulin with Slunj, Vrbovsko and Delnice.

With the withdrawal of the Italians, the chances of a successful Serb rebellion increased. Shortly after the Drvar uprising, Božidar Cerovski, director of the Directorate of the Ustaša Police, arrived in Slunj, on the evening of 29 July 1941, along with an undetermined number of Ustaše from Zagreb for the removal of "undesirable elements". In the morning of the 30th, they broke up into several groups and walked through Serb inhabitted settlements with lists of such individuals, detaining them and transporting them to Oštarski Stanovi, where they were executed on the order of Cerovski.

In the summer and autumn of 1941, many of the Serbs from the environs of Cazin and Velika Kladuša fled to Slunj to convert to Catholicism, in order to avoid conversion to Islam.

Beginning on 19 June 1942, the Battle of Tržić took place between Kamenica and Tržić Tounjski. An army of Partisans attacked Tržić Tounjski, with the goal of destroying the bridge and disarming the Croatian forces in Tržić. The bridge was guarded by the 3rd Regiment of the Second Domobran Division. Battles continued with 6 waves of Domobran attacks until the 23rd, when the Partisan army took Tržić and captured the survivors. Across the river, the Domobrani of Primišlje retreated to Slunj.

=== SFRY ===
The Cazin uprising of 1950, an armed anti-state rebellion of peasants, which mostly affected the Bosnian towns Cazin and Velika Kladuša, also affected Slunj to a lesser extent. All of the cities were a part of Communist Yugoslavia at the time. Peasants revolted against the forced collectivization and collective farms by the Yugoslav government on the farmers of its country. Following a drought in 1949, the peasants of Yugoslavia were unable to meet unrealistic quotas set by their government and were punished. The revolt that followed the drought resulted in the killings and persecution of those who organized the uprising, but also many innocent civilians. It was the only peasant rebellion in the history of Cold War Europe.

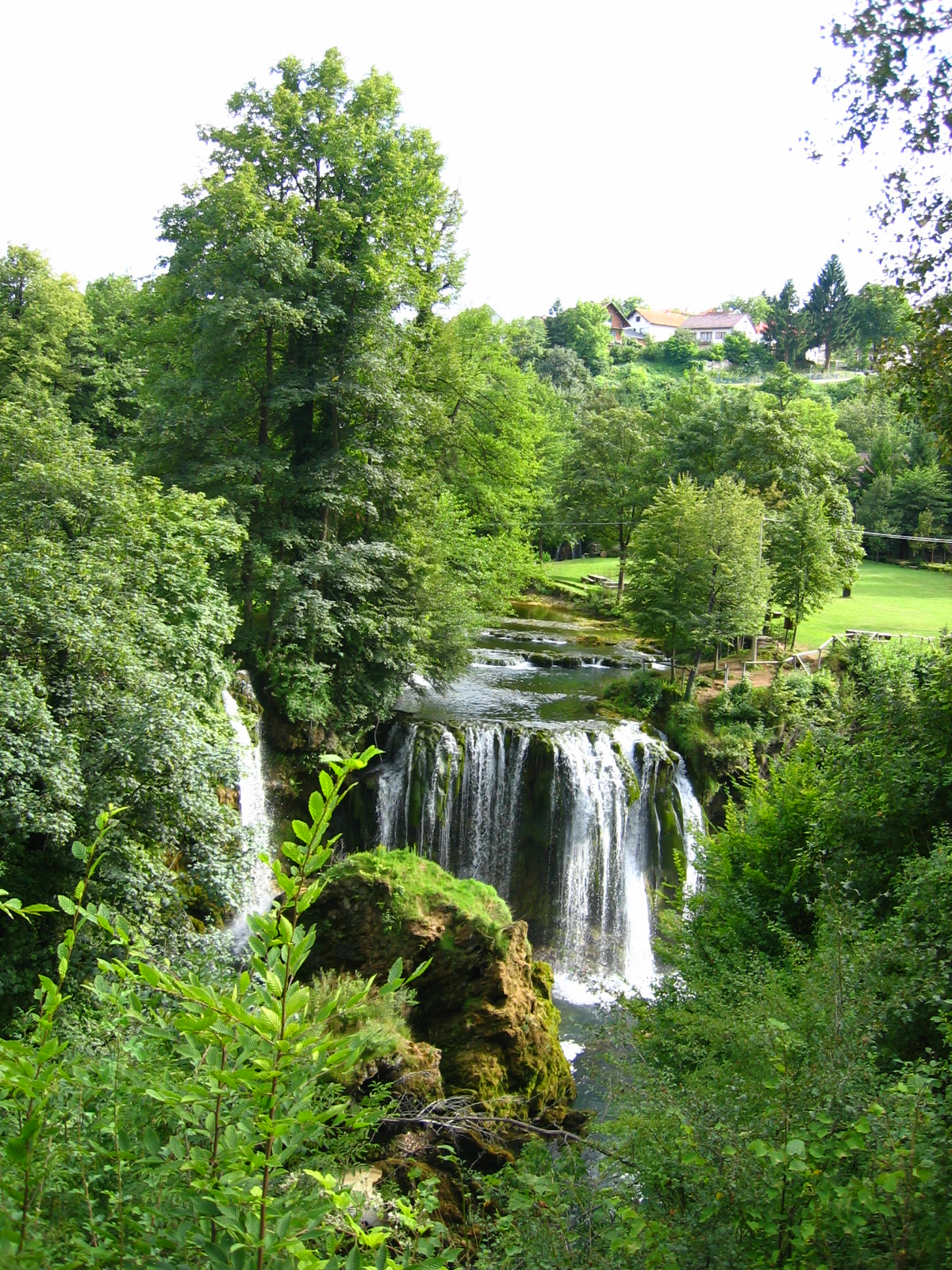
Rastoke waterfall

In 1963, the Austrian writer Heimito von Doderer published the novel The Waterfalls of Slunj (German: Die Wasserfälle von Slunj) which features a climactic sequence set in this locality. During the 20th century scientific research studies were carried out in the Slunj area and particularly its Rastoke district. During the 19th century and at the beginning of the 20th century Rastoke has been the center of social life in this region. With the development of the electric mill and massive emigration after the Second World War the economic significance of the mills in Rastoke has declined drastically.

== Places of interest ==
Slunj is famous for its little waterfalls and the well-preserved corn mills (dating back to the 18th century) in the picturesque lower part of the town, called Rastoke (referring to the branching of the rivers). At Slunj, the Slunjčica river (also called “Slušnica“ by local people) flows over several waterfalls and cascades into the Korana river. Here is also the location of the 22 water mills of Rastoke.

== Demographics ==
In 1895, the obćina of Slunj, with an area of 129 square kilometres (50 mi^{2}), belonged to the kotar of Slunj (Slunj court and electoral district) in the županija of Modruš-Rieka (Ogulin court and financial board). There were 1322 houses, with a population of 8847. Its 30 villages and 11 hamlets were divided for taxation purposes into 8 porezne obćine, under the Slunj office. In the 846 square kilometres (327 mi^{2}) Slunj kotar, there were a total of 6493 houses, with a population of 44,338. Its 92 villages and 150 hamlets were divided into 38 porezne obćine. The kotar had no statistical markets. Slunj kotar was divided into 6 općine. Besides itself: Drežnik, Primišlje, Rakovica, Vališ Selo, Veljun.

In 1910, the court of Slunj encompassed an area of 846 square kilometres (327 mi^{2}), with a population of 46,360. Slunj had its own cadastral jurisdiction, but its business court was in Ogulin.

As of 2011, most of Slunj's population is Croatian (87.9%) followed by Serbs (10.5%) and a small number of other ethnic groups.

Town of Slunj: Population trends 1857–2021
v

population	19430	19412	18110	20498	20724	21035	18749	21256	17004	16518	15798	13629	11799	10096	6096	5076	4224
	1857	1869	1880	1890	1900	1910	1921	1931	1948	1953	1961	1971	1981	1991	2001	2011	2021

Sources: Croatian Bureau of Statistics publications

=== Settlements ===
The settlements in the Town of Slunj are (as of 2021):

- Arapovac, population 1 ▼
- Bandino Selo, population 1 ▼
- Blagaj, population 24 ▼
- Bukovac Perjasički, population 1 ▼
- Crno Vrelo, population 6 ▼
- Cvijanović Brdo, population 0 ▼
- Cvitović, population 234 ▼
- Čamerovac, population 34 ▼
- Donja Glina, population 15 ▼
- Donja Visočka, population 4 ▼
- Donje Primišlje, population 22 ▼
- Donje Taborište, population 181 ▼
- Donji Cerovac, population 116 ▼
- Donji Furjan, population 39 ▼
- Donji Kremen, population 42 ▼
- Donji Lađevac, population 34 ▼
- Donji Nikšić, population 171 ▼
- Donji Poloj, population 8 ▼
- Donji Popovac, population 12 ▼
- Dubrave, population 6 ▼
- Glinsko Vrelo, population 39 ▼
- Gornja Glina, population 106 ▼
- Gornja Visočka, population 5 ▼
- Gornje Primišlje, population 7 ▼
- Gornje Taborište, population 205 ▼
- Gornji Cerovac, population 83 ▼
- Gornji Furjan, population 57 ▼
- Gornji Kremen, population 40 ▼
- Gornji Lađevac, population 45 ▼
- Gornji Nikšić, population 49 ▲
- Gornji Popovac, population 146 ▼
- Grobnik, population 10 ▼
- Jame, population 21 ▼
- Klanac Perjasički, population 5 ▼
- Kosa, population 10 ▼
- Kosijer Selo, population 4 ▼
- Kutanja, population 0 ▼
- Kuzma Perjasička, population 4 ▼
- Lađevačko Selište, population 6 ▼
- Lapovac, population 6 ▼
- Lumbardenik, population 132 ▼
- Mali Vuković, population 74 ▼
- Marindolsko Brdo, population 49 ▼
- Miljevac, population 10
- Mjesto Primišlje, population 39 ▼
- Novo Selo, population 52 ▼
- Pavlovac, population 19 ▼
- Podmelnica, population 155 ▼
- Polje, population 28 ▼
- Rabinja, population 0
- Rastoke, population 46 ▼
- Salopek Luke, population 9 ▼
- Sastavak, population 10 ▼
- Slunj, population 1576 ▼
- Slunjčica, population 3 ▼
- Snos, population 4 ▼
- Sparednjak, population 2 ▼
- Stojmerić, population 1 ▼
- Šlivnjak, population 12 ▼
- Točak, population 57 ▼
- Tržić Primišljanski, population 9 ▼
- Veljun, population 90 ▼
- Veljunska Glina, population 5 ▼
- Veljunski Ponorac, population 11 ▼
- Videkić Selo, population 14 ▼
- Zapoljak, population 1 ▼
- Zečev Varoš, population 17 ▼

== Sport ==
=== Football ===
Although Slunj is very small, it has many sport clubs. Most famous are the football club NK Slunj and MNK Drenak. There are two football fields in Slunj. One is situated in the center of Slunj and popularly called Gradsko igralište (Town field) and the other is Zubac, which is the official turf of NK Slunj.

=== Koranski susreti ===
On the last day of "Dani grada Slunja" (festivity called Days of the city of Slunj), which usually takes place at the beginning of August, games are organized on main swimming area on the river Korana. Participating teams compete in many games like swimming and snorkeling and many other.

== Infrastructure ==
In 1913, there were 7 gendarmeries in Slunj kotar: Cetin-grad, Gornja Močila, Nova Kršlja, Primišlje, Rakovica, Slunj and Veljun.

== Notable people ==
- Milan Neralić, fencer and winner of the Bronze Medal at the 1900 Summer Olympics

== Acknowledgements ==
- Slunj was included in the list of the 54 best tourist villages in the world by UNWTO in 2023.

== Twin towns ==
- Castel San Giovanni, Italy
- Grude, Bosnia and Herzegovina
- Mississauga, Canada

== Gallery ==
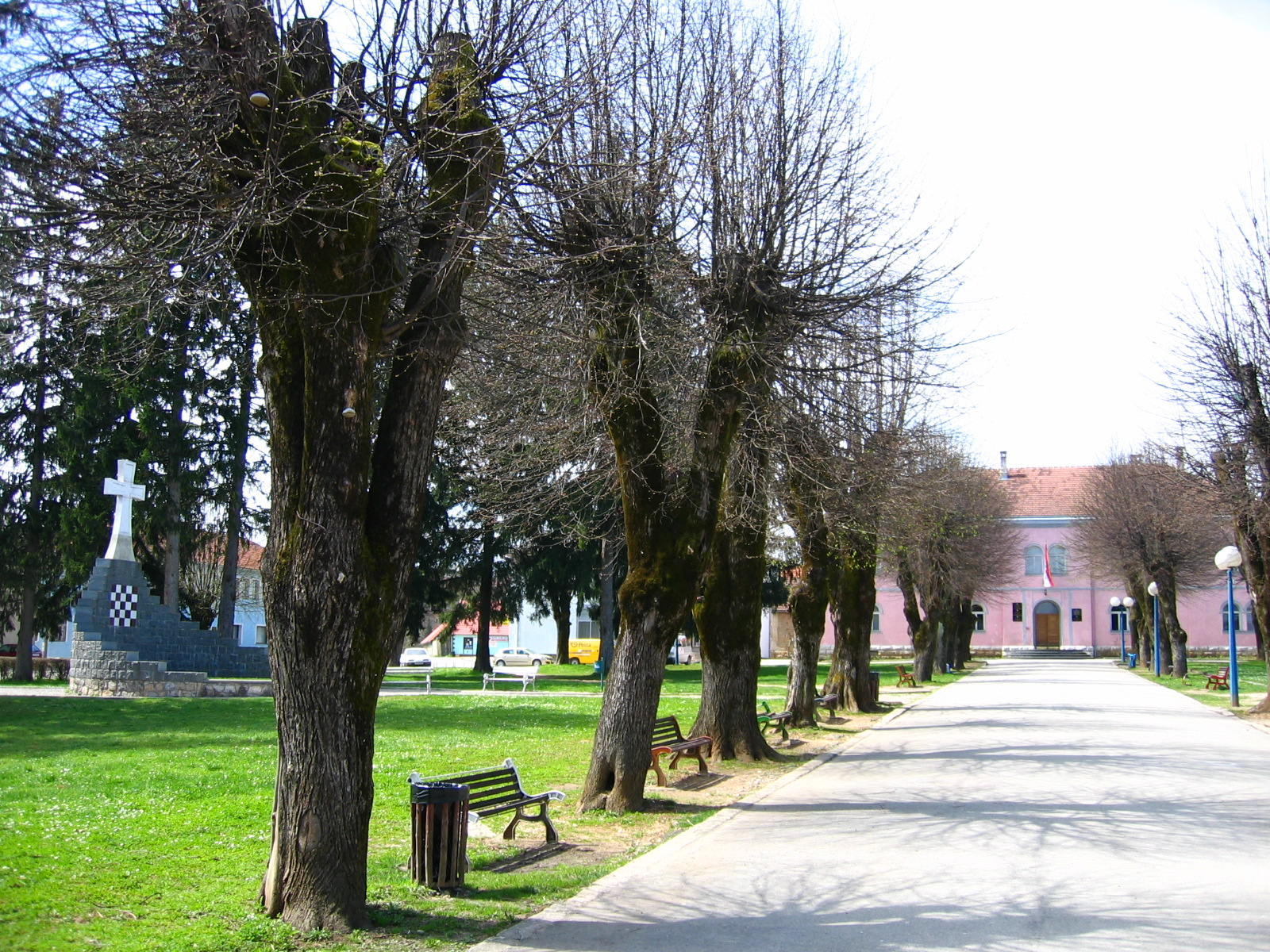
Park in the town center

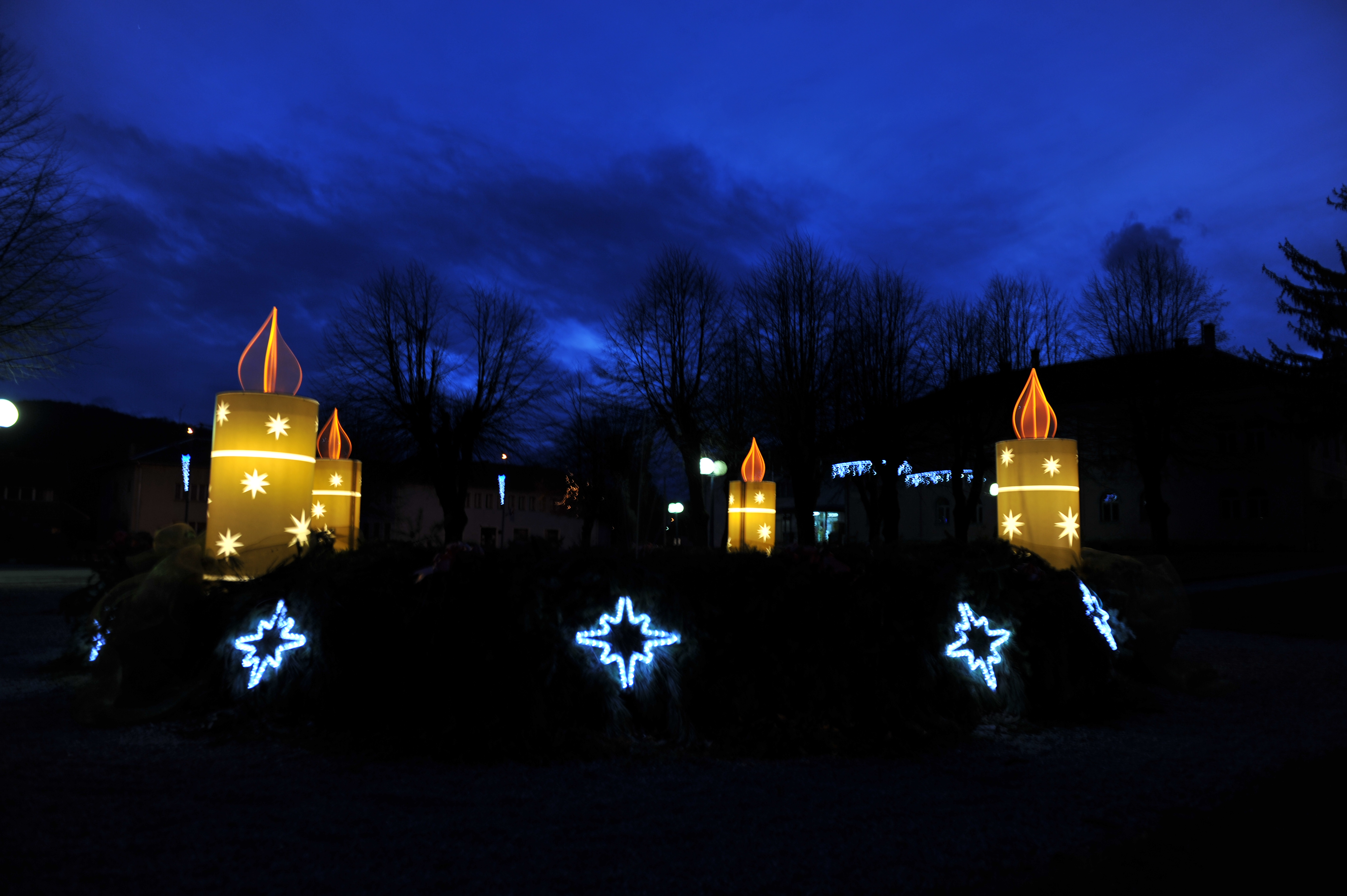
Christmas decorations in Slunj

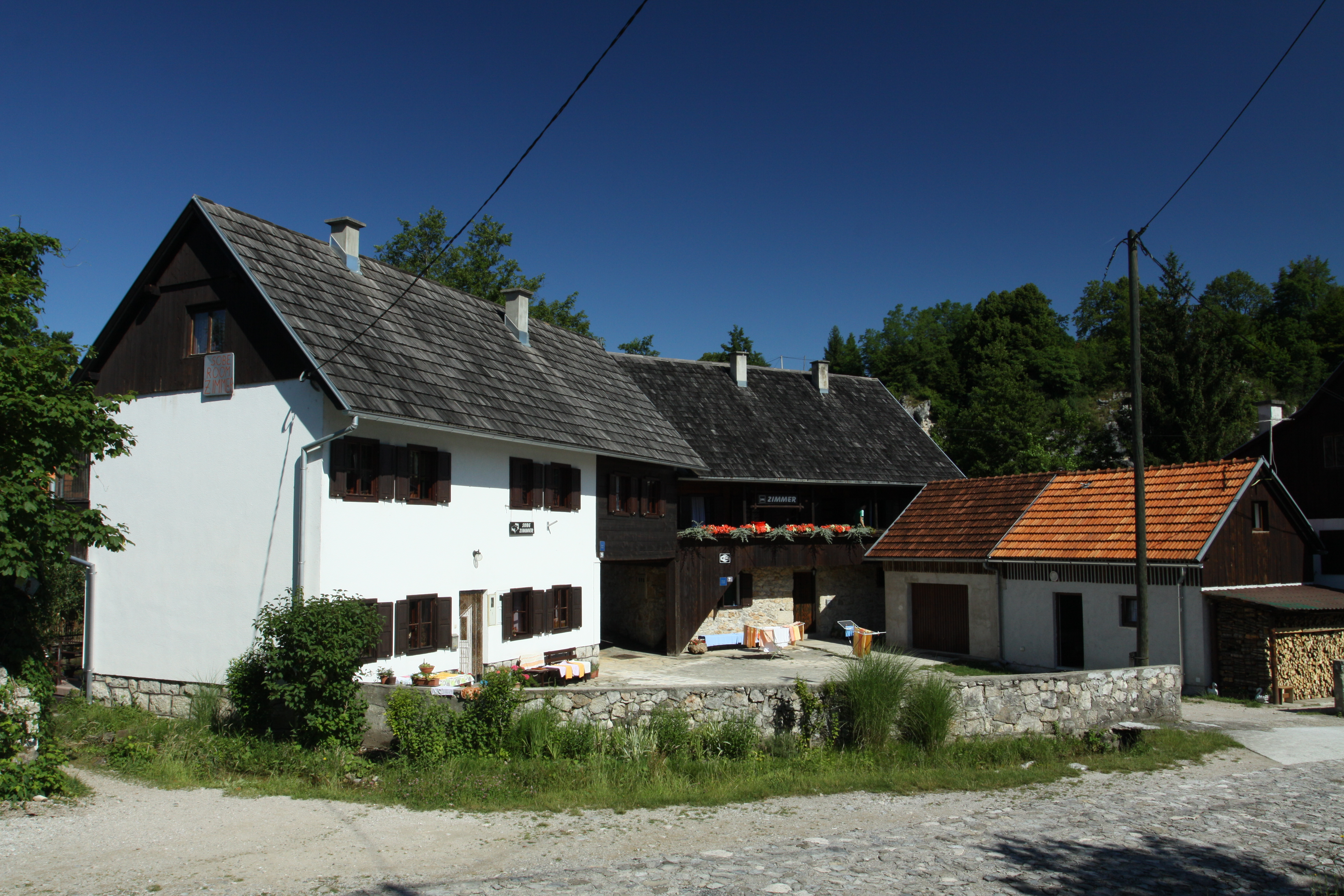
Houses in Rastoke

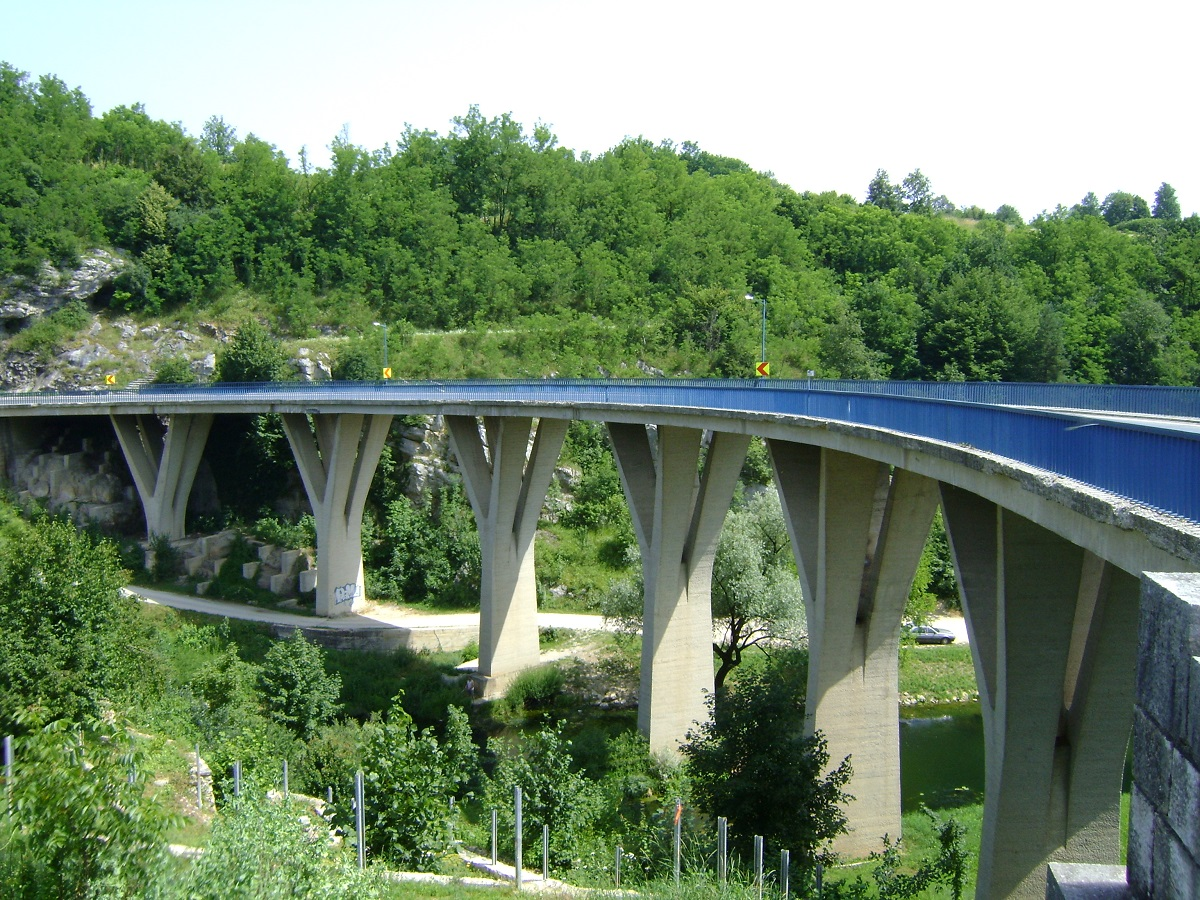
Korana Bridge

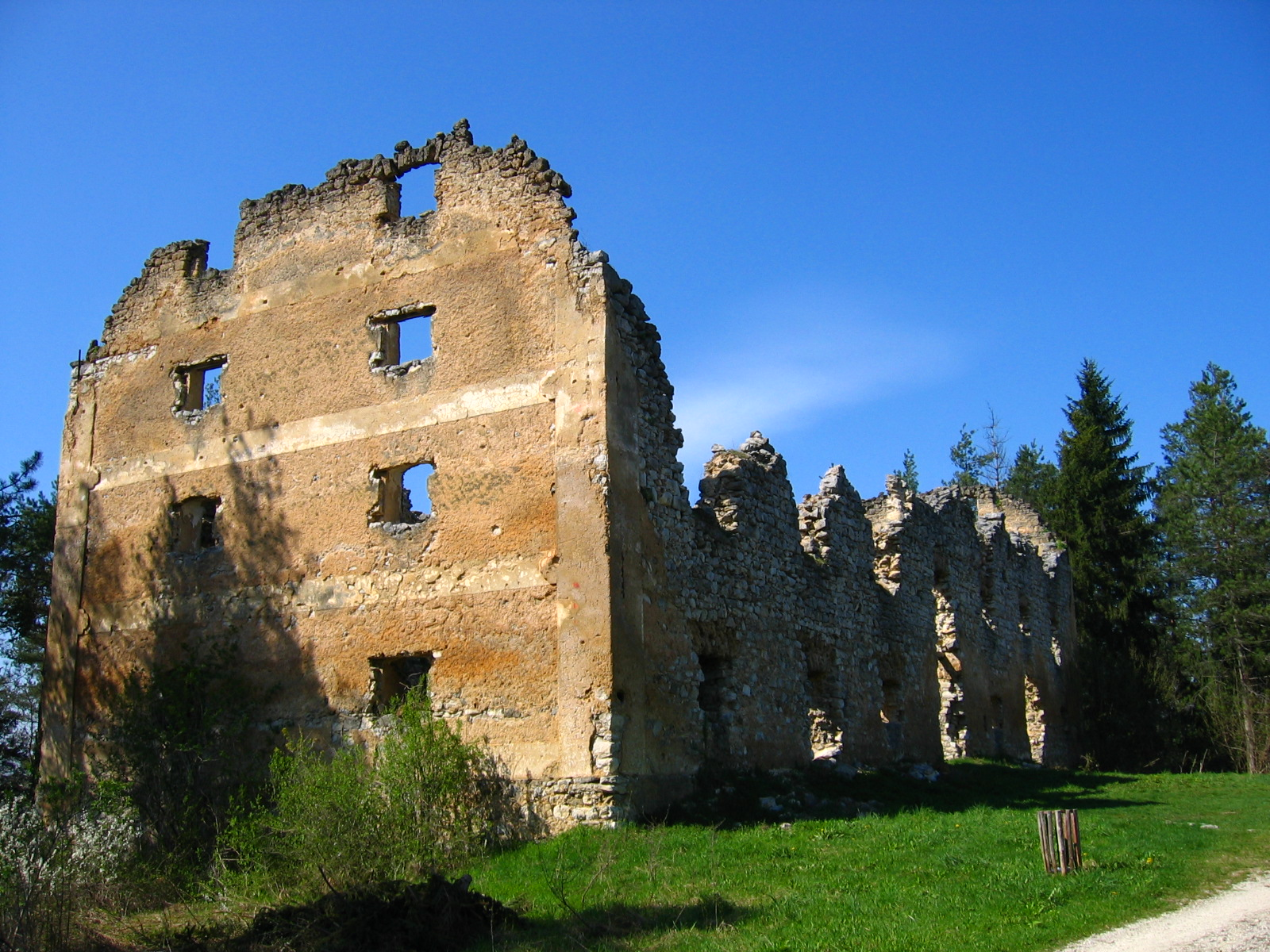
Warehouse from Napoleonic times

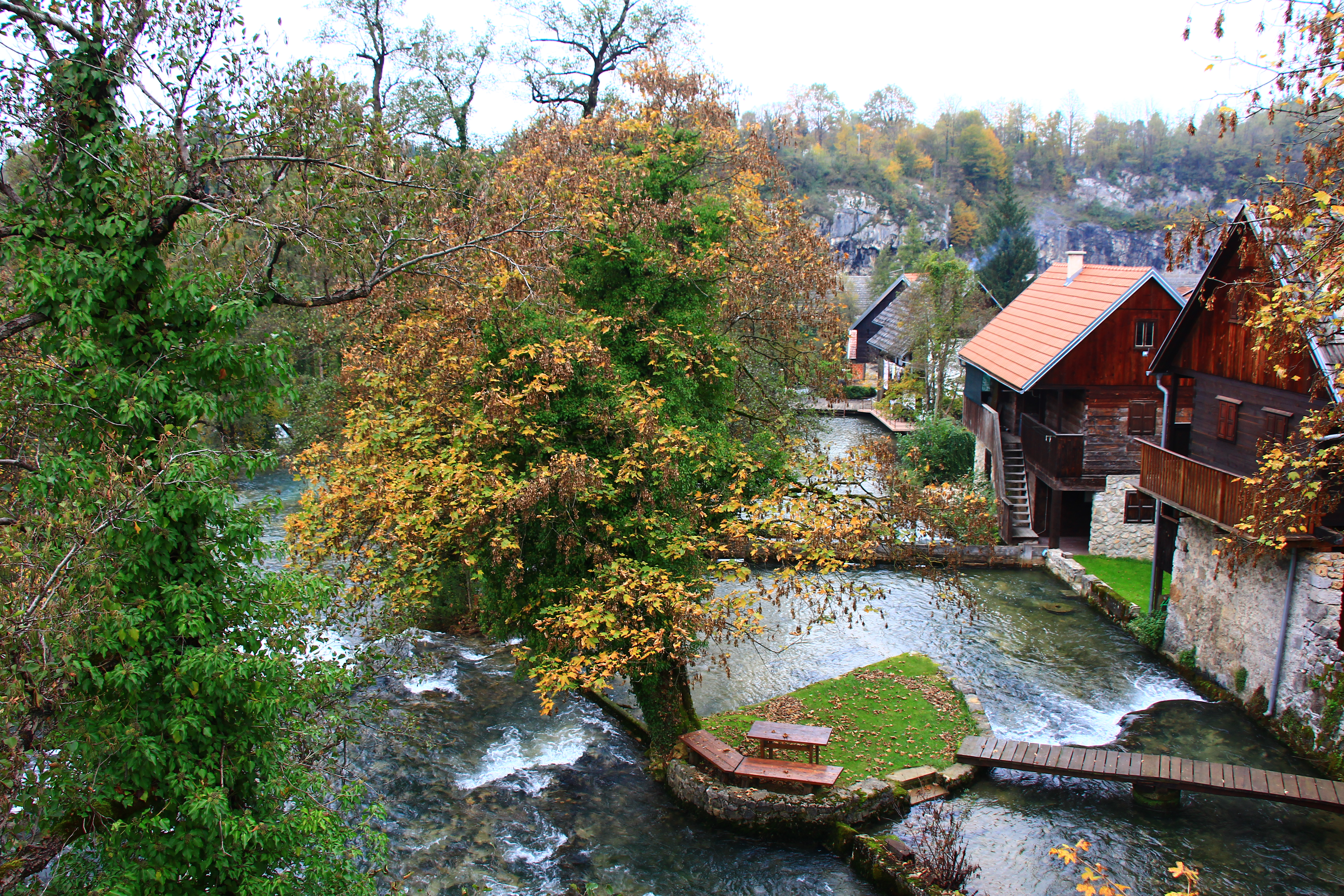
View of Rastoke

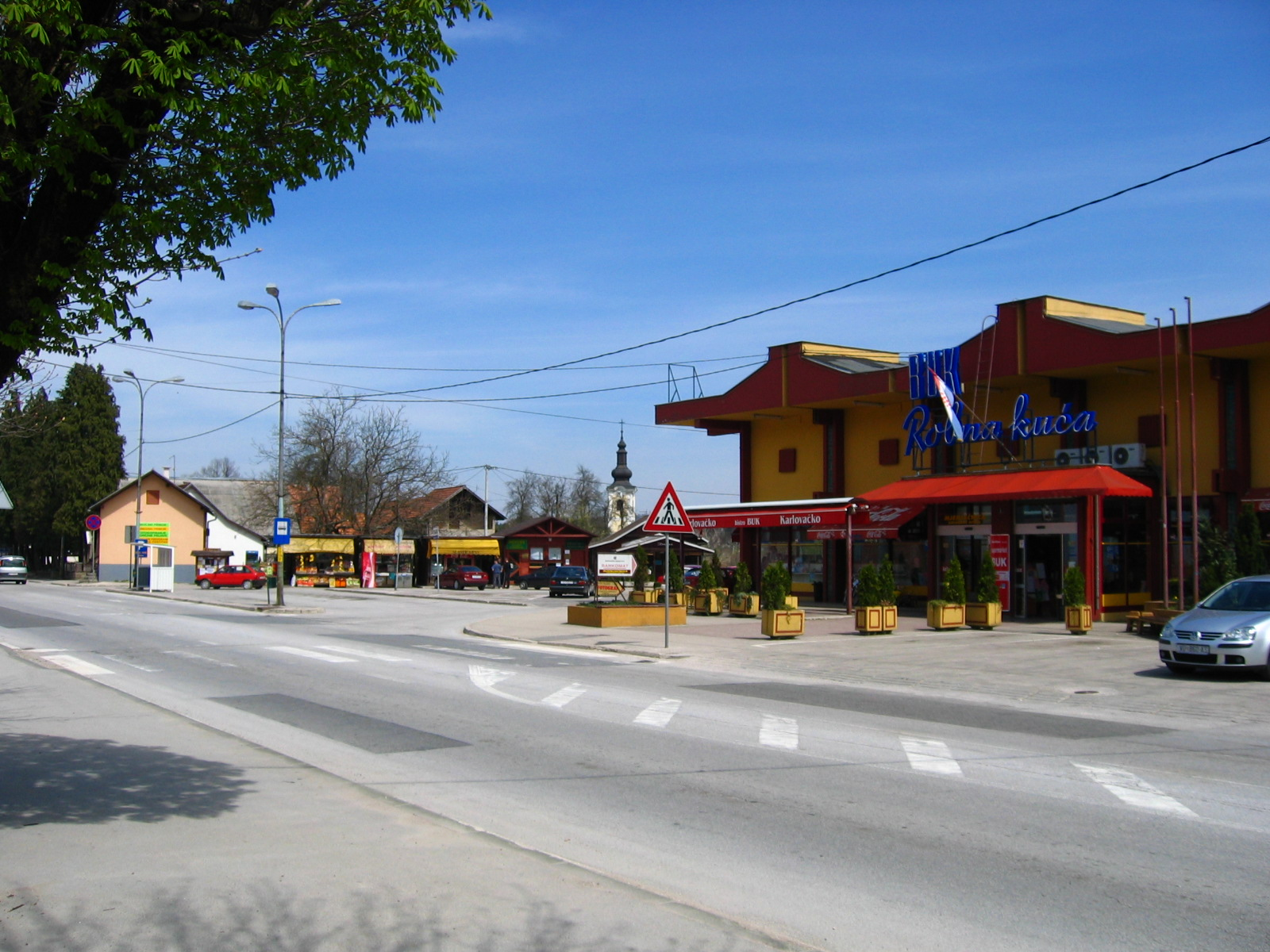
In front of the "Buk" department store.

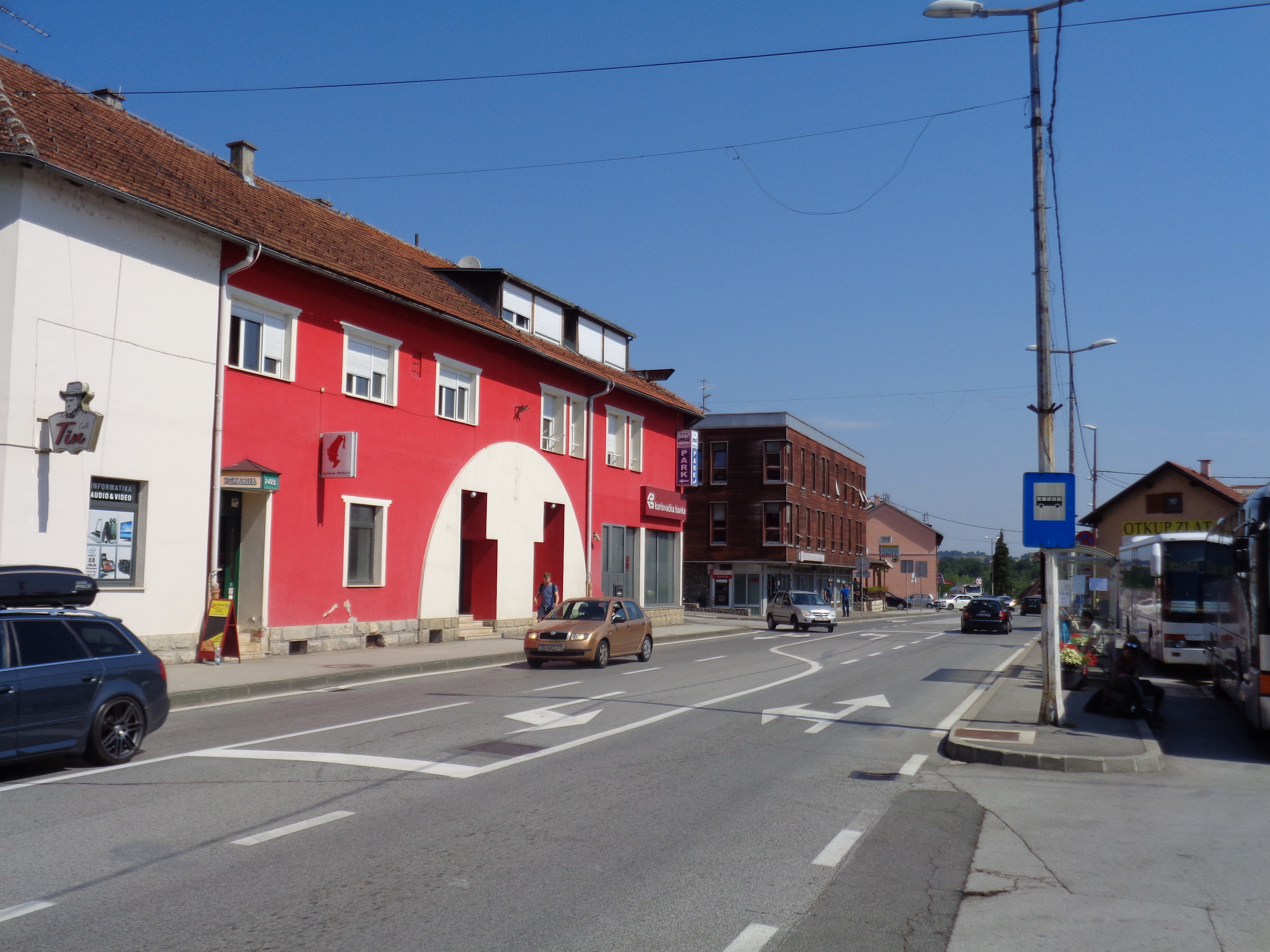
Brothers Radić Street

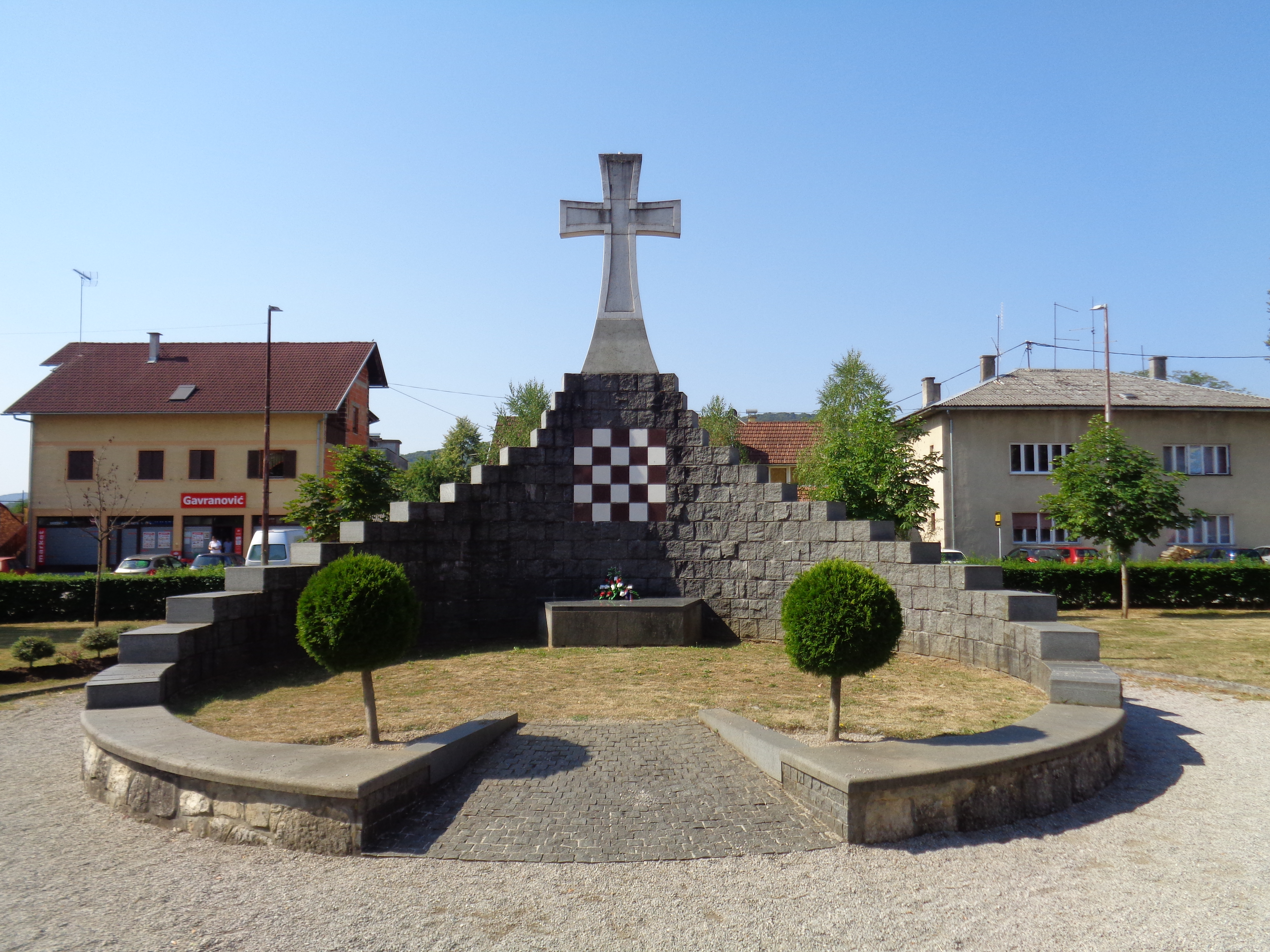
Memorial to fallen defenders and civil victims of the Croatian War of Independence

== Bibliography ==
- Trgo, Fabijan, ed. (1964). Zbornik dokumenata i podataka o Narodno-oslobodilačkom ratu Jugoslovenskih naroda. Vol. V, 32.
