= Buhača =

- Village
- Location of Buhača in Croatia
- Coordinates: 45°11′17″N 15°45′22″E
- Country: Croatia
- Region: Continental Croatia
- County: Karlovac
- Municipality: Cetingrad

Area
  - Total: 5.9 km^{2} (2.3 sq mi)
- Elevation: 220 m (720 ft)

Population (2021)
  - Total: 30
  - Density: 5.1/km^{2} (13/sq mi)
- Time zone: UTC+1 (CET)
  - Summer (DST): UTC+2 (CEST)
- Postal code: 47222 Cetingrad

Buhača (or Buvača) is a village in central Croatia, in the municipality of Cetingrad, Karlovac County. It is connected by the D216 highway.

== History ==
The Eastern Orthodox church of the Holy Apostles Peter and Paul, built in the Byzantine style in 1800. In the World War II, the temple devastated and looted by the Ustashas. After the war it was repaired. The church is situated on small hill above Maljevac settlement and is very visible from the main road connecting Velika Kladuša and Vojnić. The roof of the church is in terrible condition. The parochy includes Maljevac, Maljevačko Selište, Buhača, Cetingrad, Vališ Selo and Grabarska in neighboring Bosnia.

Until 1991, the village was part of the settlement of Maljevac in the municipality of Slunj. It is an independent settlement since 2001.

== Demographics ==
According to the 2011 census, the village of Buhača has 36 inhabitants.

Historical population 1857-2011
v

population	743	787	730	279	598				124	155	76	111			29	36
	1857	1869	1880	1890	1900	1910	1921	1931	1948	1953	1961	1971	1981	1991	2001	2011

Sources: Croatian Bureau of Statistics publications

== Notable natives and residents ==
- Milan Vujaklija (1891–1955) - a linguist, writer and translator, the author of the Dictionary of Foreign Words and Expressions
