= Cetingrad =

Cetingrad Kekić Selo, Vališ Selo
- Municipality
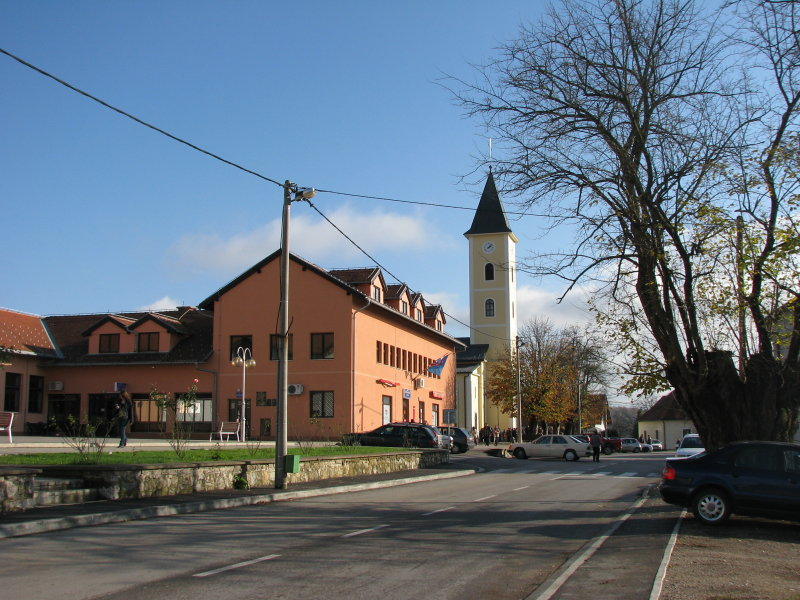
- Interactive map of Cetingrad
- Location within Croatia
- Coordinates: 45.160°N 15.739°E
- Country: Croatia
- County: Karlovac County

Government
  - Mayor: Marina Kalić

Area
  - Municipality: 136.8 km^{2} (52.8 sq mi)
  - Urban: 4.3 km^{2} (1.7 sq mi)

Population (2021)
  - Municipality: 1,491
  - Density: 10.90/km^{2} (28.23/sq mi)
  - Urban: 293
  - Urban density: 68/km^{2} (180/sq mi)
- Time zone: UTC+1 (Central European Time)
- Website: cetingrad.hr

Cetingrad is a municipality in Karlovac County, Croatia near Croatia's border with Bosnia. The population of the village itself is 319, while the total municipality population is 2,027 (2011). The municipality is part of Kordun. Cetingrad is underdeveloped municipality which is statistically classified as the First Category Area of Special State Concern by the Government of Croatia.

== Administrative division ==
Cetingrad is today a municipality and part of Karlovac County in Croatia.

According to Roman Catholic organization, the parish of Cetingrad is a part of Slunj deanery, together with Slunj, Blagaj, Cvitović, Lađevac, Rakovica, Drežnik, Vaganac, Zavalje, Korenica and Plitvice.

== History ==
Cetingrad was built in the vicinity of the ruins of the mediaeval fortress of Cetin. The Middle Ages was the golden era of Cetin. Near the fortress there was Franciscan monastery and several churches. At that time Cetin was the property of Frankopan family and it played important role in History of Croatia.

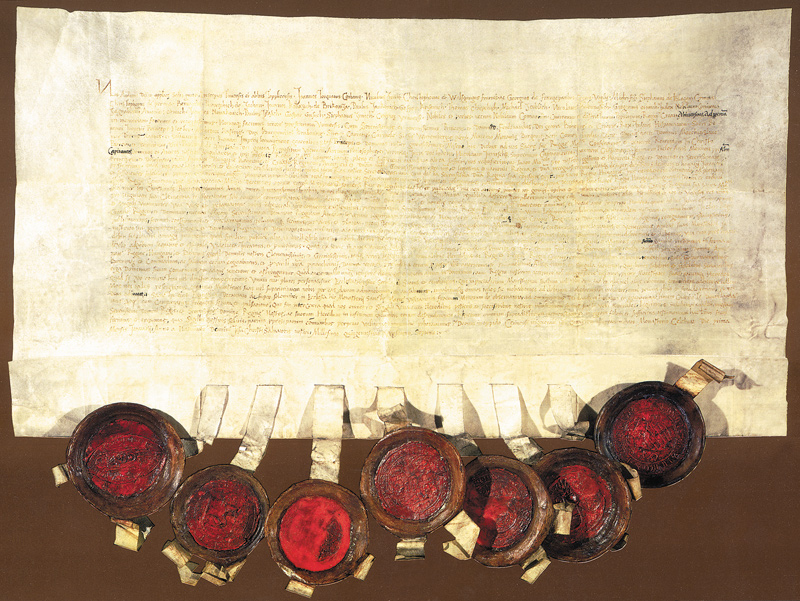
Cetingrad Charter from 1527

After defeat in Battle of Mohács in 1526, the Croatian nobility gathered at Cetin to conduct the 1527 election in Cetin, where they elected Habsburg Ferdinand I, Archduke of Austria as the king of Croatia. The charter signed by Croatian nobles and representatives of Ferdinand of Habsburg is among most important documents of Croatian statehood and is preserved in Austrian State Archives in Vienna.

In next centuries Cetin was part of Military Frontier, the borderland between Habsburg monarchy and Ottoman Empire. During this period Ottoman army took control over it several times. The fortress was several times damaged and repaired. In 1790 Austrian troops under the command of general Walisch finally returned back Cetin Castle to the Habsburg monarchy.

In 1809 Ottoman forces once again occupied Cetin but in 1810 they withdrew under the threats of Marshal Marmont, governor-general of Illyrian provinces. When the Ottoman threat was gone the fortress was abandoned and used as quarry. Administrative control was transferred to village of Cetingrad which developed north to the Cetin.

In the 19th and 20th century the area was rarely populated and without any real opportunity for economic development. During World War II area once again experienced great suffering and destruction and after the war socialist Yugoslavia neglected this area. Due to poverty population was forced to migrate, first overseas and later to European countries.

During the Yugoslav Wars, Cetingrad and the surrounding area was militarily conquered. It was part of the Republic of Serb Krajina until 1995. Most of Cetingrad's population spent four years in exile. Serb rebels burnt and then destroyed the biggest Roman Catholic church in Slunj deanery (church of Assumption of Mary, crkva Marijina Uznesenja, built in 1891). The church was later rebuilt.

In May 1995, Cetingrad was the site of a helicopter crash, caused by a missile fired by Serbs, in which the foreign minister of Bosnia and Herzegovina Irfan Ljubijankić and six others were killed. In August 1995 during the Operation Storm Croatian army took Cetingrad. After 1995, Cetingrad was successfully rebuilt and large number of people returned to their homes.

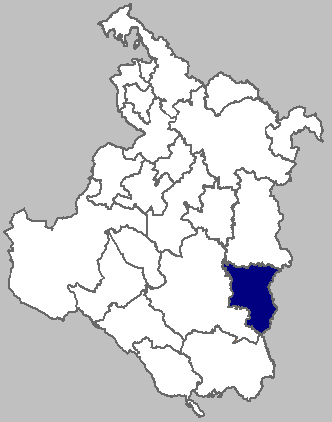
Image of Cetingrad municipality within Karlovac County

== Demographics ==
In 1895, the obćina of Vališ Selo (court at Vališ Selo), with an area of 130 square kilometres (50 mi^{2}), belonged to the kotar of Slunj (Slunj court and electoral district) in the županija of Modruš-Rieka (Ogulin court and financial board). There were 1173 houses, with a population of 8832. Its 13 villages and 14 hamlets were divided for taxation purposes into 9 porezne obćine, under the Slunj office.

According to the 2011 census, Municipality of Cetingrad has the following ethnic breakdown:

Ethnic group	Number	Percentage
Croats	1,510	74.5%
Bosniaks	314	15.5%
Serbs	101	5.0%

== Villages in municipality ==
- Batnoga
- Begovo Brdo
- Bilo
- Bogovolja
- Buhača
- Cetinski Varoš
- Delić Poljana
- Donja Žvrnica
- Donje Gnojnice
- Đurin Potok
- Glinice
- Gojkovac
- Gornja Žrvnica
- Gornje Gnojnice
- Grabarska
- Kapljuv
- Kestenje
- Komesarac
- Kruškovača
- Kuk
- Luke
- Maljevac
- Maljevačko Selište
- Pašin Potok
- Podcetin
- Polojski Varoš
- Ponor
- Ruševica
- Sadikovac
- Srednje Selo
- Strmačka
- Šiljkovača
- Tatar Varoš
- Trnovi

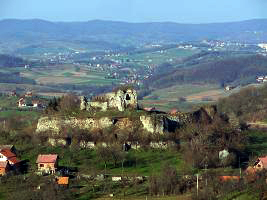
Cetin Castle with the village of Cetingrad in the background

== Culture ==
Cetingrad is home to a monument to Croatian soldiers from the Croatian War of Independence. August 7 is celebrated as the municipal day to commemorate its liberation from the RSK on that day in 1995.

== Infrastructure ==
In 1913, there were 7 gendarmeries in Slunj kotar: Cetin-grad, Gornja Močila, Nova Kršlja, Primišlje, Rakovica, Slunj and Veljun.

== Sources ==
- Radoslav Lopašić: Oko Kupe i Korane, Matica Hrvatska, 1895, Zagreb
- Milan Kruhek: Cetin, grad izbornog sabora Kraljevine Hrvatske 1527, Karlovačka Županija, 1997, Karlovac
- Iz memoara maršala Marmonta: ilirske uspomene 1806–1811, Čakavski Sabor, 1977, Split
- Nadilo, Branko (2002). "Pregled utvrda južnog Korduna i ruševine Cetingrada" (PDF). Građevinar (in Croatian). 54 (11): 691–695.
