= D216 road =

Road in Croatia

D216 state road

Route information
- Length: 25.0 km (15.5 mi)

Major junctions
- From: D6 in Vojnić
- To: Maljevac border crossing to Bosnia and Herzegovina

Location
- Country: Croatia
- Counties: Sisak-Moslavina
- Major cities: Vojnić

Highway system
- Highways in Croatia

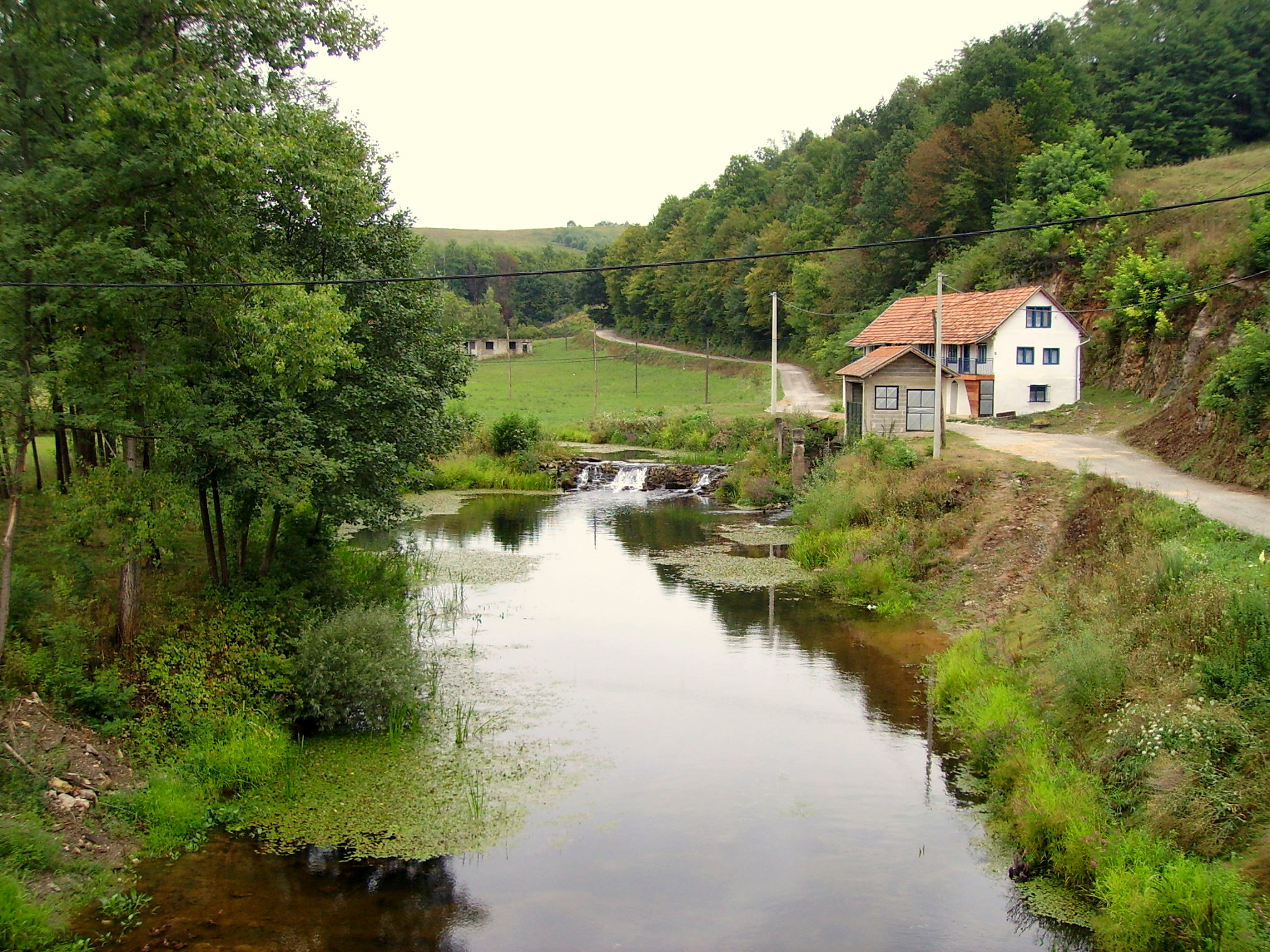
Maljevac, near the southern terminus of the D216 road

D216 is a state road in central Croatia connecting Vojnić and the D6 state road to Maljevac border crossing to Velika Kladuša, Bosnia and Herzegovina. The road is 25.0 km (15.5 mi) long.

The road, as well as all other state roads in Croatia, is managed and maintained by Hrvatske ceste, state owned company.

== Traffic volume ==
Traffic is regularly counted and reported by Hrvatske ceste, operator of the road.

D216 traffic volume
Road	Counting site	AADT	ASDT	Notes
D216	3103 Kupljensko	1,737	2,217	Between the Ž3290 and Ž3224 junctions.

== Road junctions and populated areas ==
D216 junctions/populated areas
Type	Slip roads/Notes
	Vojnić; D6 to Karlovac and Glina. The northern terminus of the road.
	Kolarić; Ž3290 to Krnjak and the D1 state road.
	Kupljensko
	Ž3224 to Johovo and Klokoč.
	Miholjsko
	Krstinja
	Donja Brusovača; Ž3224 to Klokoč and Dunjak.
	Jagrovac
	Maljevac; Ž3229 to Katinovac, Topusko and the D6 state road. Ž3271 to Pašin Potok.
	Maljevac border crossing The road extends to Velika Kladuša, Bosnia and Herzegovina. The southern terminus of the road.
