= Slapnica (disambiguation) =

Slapnica can refer to:

- Slapnica, a village near Kakanj, Bosnia and Herzegovina
- Slapnica, Croatia, a hamlet near Samobor, Croatia
- Todorovska Slapnica, a village near Velika Kladuša, Bosnia and Herzegovina
