= Radio Velika Kladuša =

Bosnian radio station

Velika Kladuša; Bosnia and Herzegovina
- Broadcast area: Una-Sana Canton
- Frequency: Velika Kladuša 89.1 MHz
- Branding: Public

Programming
- Language: Bosnian language
- Format: Local news, talk and music

Ownership
- Owner: JP Radio Velika Kladuša

History
- First air date: February 2, 2001
- Call sign meaning: VKLADUSA

Technical information
- Transmitter coordinates: 45°11′N 15°48′E
- Repeater: Velika Kladuša/Keserovića brdo

Links
- Webcast: On website
- Website: www.radiovkladusa.ba

Radio Velika Kladuša is a Bosnian local public radio station, broadcasting from Velika Kladuša, Bosnia and Herzegovina.

Radio Velika Kladuša was launched on 2 February 2001 by the Municipal council of Velika Kladuša. This radio station broadcasts a variety of programs such as music, sport, local news and talk shows. Program is mainly produced in Bosnian language and it is available in Una-Sana Canton, Bosanska Krajina area and in neighboring Croatia.

Estimated number of potential listeners of Radio Velika Kladuša is around 30,439.

== Frequencies ==
The program is currently broadcast at one frequency:

- Velika Kladuša 89.1 MHz

== See also ==
- List of radio stations in Bosnia and Herzegovina
- Radio Bihać
- Radio Cazin
- Radio USK
- Radio Velkaton
- Trend Radio
