= Radio Velkaton =

Bosnian radio station

Velika Kladuša; Bosnia and Herzegovina
- Frequency: Velika Kladuša 107.0 MHz
- RDS: VELKATON

Programming
- Language: Bosnian language

Ownership
- Owner: RTV VT ROYAL d.o.o. Velika Kladuša

History
- First air date: May 3, 1984

Technical information
- Transmitter coordinates: 45°11′N 15°48′E
- Translator: Pećigrad/Kudića brdo-Karanova glavica

Links
- Website: www.velkaton.ba

Radio Velkaton is a Bosnian local commercial radio station, broadcasting from Velika Kladuša, Bosnia and Herzegovina.

This radio station broadcasts a variety of programs such as music, talk show and local news. The owner of the radio station is the company RTV VT ROYAL d.o.o. Velika Kladuša.

Program is mainly produced in Bosnian language at one FM frequency (Velika Kladuša 107.0 MHz) and it is available in the Una-Sana Canton and in neighboring Croatia.

Estimated number of listeners of Radio Velkaton is around 105.383.

== History ==
Radio Velkaton was founded on 3 May 1984.

The founder and director of the radio was Sead Purić, long-term journalist with journalistic experience at Radio Belgrade, Zagreb and Ljubljana, and an editor at Radio Sarajevo. According to media reports, Sead Purić is known in the Krajina area as a former spokesman for Fikret Abdić.

During the war in Bosnia and Herzegovina, Radio Velkaton was an important media and radio station for politician Fikret Abdić and his ambitions to create an Autonomous Province of Western Bosnia.

When the Autonomous Province of Western Bosnia was proclaimed on September 27, 1993, led by Fikret Abdić, Radio Velkaton-Radio Velika Kladuša was one of the few media institiutions that existed and worked in Velika Kladuša (along with: News agency ZBIA - Zapadnobosanska informativna agencija ZBIA, television channel TV Velkaton and weekly Zapadna Bosna). All of these were under the absolute control of Abdić's government and their task was to support the government, justify the conflict among Bosniaks and raise the morale of fighters for autonomy, inciting hatred towards members of the Army of Bosnia and Herzegovina with whom they clashed with the support of Chetniks and the like.

== Frequencies ==
- Velika Kladuša 107.0 MHz

== See also ==
- List of radio stations in Bosnia and Herzegovina
- Radio Velika Kladuša
- Radio Bihać
- Radio USK
- Radio Ključ
- Radio Sana
- Trend Radio
