= Žabljak (disambiguation) =

Žabljak is a town in Montenegro.

Žabljak may also refer to:

- Žabljak (river), a river near Livno, Bosnia and Herzegovina
- Žabljak, Livno, a village in the municipality of Livno, Bosnia and Herzegovina
- Žabljak, Usora, a village in the municipality of Usora, Bosnia and Herzegovina
- Žabljak, Croatia, a village in the municipality of Barilović
- Žabljak Crnojevića, an abandoned medieval fortress, the historical capital of Montenegro
- Žabljak Municipality, a municipality of Montenegro
