= Maurovići =

Maurovići may refer to:

- Maurovići, Bosnia and Herzegovina, a village near Visoko
- Maurovići, Croatia, a village near Barilović
