= Begovo Brdo =

Begovo Brdo may refer to:

- Begovo Brdo, Serbia, a village near Kruševac
- Begovo Brdo, Croatia, a village near Cetingrad
