= Husein Miljković =

Bosniak military commander (1905–1944)

Colonel Husein Miljković
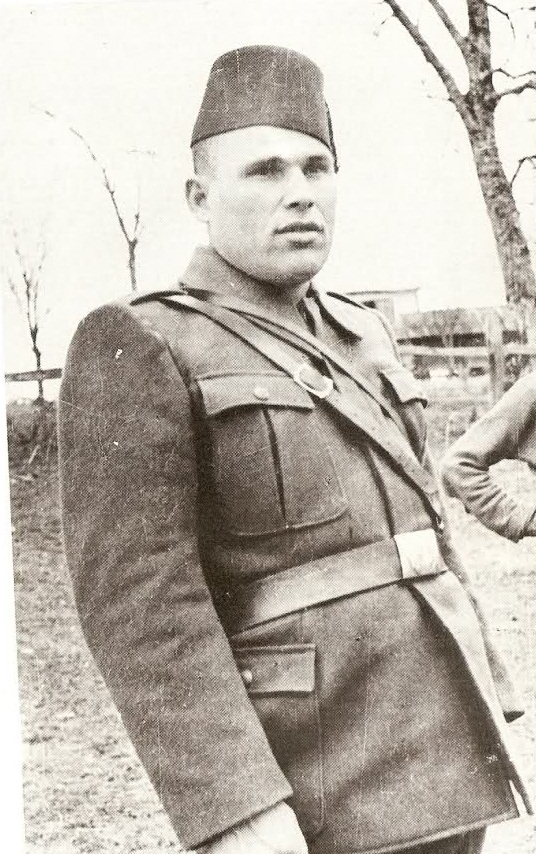
- Husein Miljković, c. 1943.
- Born: 1905; Trnovi, Velika Kladuša Condominium of Bosnia and Herzegovina (Austria-Hungary)
- Died: 27 May 1944 (aged 38–39); Mala Kladuša, Velika Kladuša, Independent State of Croatia
- Burial place: Velika Kladuša mosque
- Military career
- Allegiance: (Democratic Federal Yugoslavia) Yugoslav Partisans (April–August 1941, December 1941–February 1943, January–May 1944); Independent State of Croatia (August–December 1941, February–September 1943)
- Service years: 1941–1944
- Rank: Colonel
- Nickname: Huska
- Commands: Yugoslav Partisans in Velika Kladuša and Cazin; Krajina Muslim militia
- Conflicts: World War II

Husein "Huska" Miljković (1905 – 27 May 1944) was a Bosnian Muslim military commander who fought with various military formations in Yugoslavia during World War II. A communist politician during the interwar period, he joined the Yugoslav Partisans following the Axis invasion of Yugoslavia but defected to the Ustaše in mid-1941. He defected back to the Partisans in December 1941 and was made leader of communist forces in northwestern Bosnia during 1942. Following a political disagreement, he defected to the Ustaše yet again in February 1943 and was given command of 100 soldiers. He formed his own 3,000-strong Bosnian Muslim militia with the help of the Germans and Croats in late 1943. He agreed to align himself with the Partisans once again in early 1944, prompting Bosnian Muslim anti-communists within his militia to assassinate him in May 1944.

== Early life and political career ==
Husein Miljković was born in 1905 in the village of Trnovi, near Velika Kladuša. He belonged to a Bosnian Muslim peasant family and never attended school. In his youth, he worked as a logger and construction worker. In the 1920s, he became a delegate to the parliament of the Kingdom of Serbs, Croats and Slovenes in Belgrade. His political activities led to him being fined and imprisoned multiple times by Yugoslav authorities. In 1937, he became one of the founding members of the Communist Party in Velika Kladuša.

== World War II ==
On 6 April 1941, Axis forces invaded the Kingdom of Yugoslavia. Poorly equipped and poorly trained, the Royal Yugoslav Army was quickly defeated. The Croat nationalist leader Ante Pavelić, who had been in exile in Benito Mussolini's Italy, was then appointed Poglavnik (leader) of an Ustaše-led Croatian state—the Independent State of Croatia (often called the NDH, from the Croatian: Nezavisna Država Hrvatska). The NDH combined almost all of modern-day Croatia, all of modern-day Bosnia and Herzegovina and parts of modern-day Serbia into an "Italian-German quasi-protectorate."

Miljković became the leader of an anti-Ustaše uprising of mostly Serb citizens on Petrova Gora following the establishment of the NDH. He defected to the Ustaše in August 1941 and joined the Croatian Home Guard in Petrinja. He fought with the Croatian Home Guard until December, when he defected back to the Yugoslav Partisans and returned to Kordun. He was then transferred to the Vojnić branch of the Communist Party of Croatia (KPH). At the beginning of 1942, he became a member of the regional committee of the KPH in Karlovac. He was named commander of Velika Kladuša following the communist capture of the town in February and became the leader of the Yugoslav Partisans in Cazin. Between March and September, he served as the secretary of the regional KPH committee in Cazin. He objected when the committee was merged with the KPH headquarters in Bihać in September and was distanced from the regional communist leadership of northwestern Bosnia shortly afterwards.

Having attained the rank of deputy commander, Miljković deserted the Partisans as the Bihać field battalion began retreating from Drvar towards Livno in February 1943. He returned to Cazin and surrendered to the Ustaše 11th Infantry Regiment. He then joined the regiment in fighting against the Partisans and took command of a unit consisting of 100 men. Miljković's unit served under the 3rd Mountain Brigade of the Croatian Home Guard from June to September 1943 and was later incorporated into the 114th Jäger Division of the Wehrmacht.

With the help of the Germans and the Ustaše, Miljković formed his own militia. It consisted of eight full battalions. Approximately 3,000 soldiers joined. The unit attracted Muslim conscripts from the Croatian Home Guard and united them under the motto "For Islam!". Miljković won the support of a small circle of citizens of Velika Kladuša and local Islamic religious leaders.

The Partisans launched an unsuccessful attempt to destroy Miljković's militia in November 1943. Under German protection, Miljković began collaborating with the Chetniks against the Partisans. According to some sources, he was promoted to the rank of Colonel within the Croatian Home Guard at around this time.

The Germans, Croatians, Chetniks, and Partisans all wished to reach their own individual agreements with Miljković due to the large size of his militia. Miljković began negotiating with both the Ustaše and the Partisans in late 1943. The Ustaše proposed that his forces align themselves with the NDH and form the Krajina Brigade, while the Partisans offered to accept Miljković into their ranks. Miljković accepted the Partisan offer in January 1944 and allowed for some of his troops to join newly formed Partisan Muslim brigades. Shortly after, his entire militia joined the Partisan 4th Corps and he was promoted to the Partisan rank of Colonel.

=== Death ===
Miljković's agreements with the Partisans caused him to fall out of favour with the Germans and the Ustaše and he was killed on 27 May 1944. The affiliation of his killers is disputed. Historian Noel Malcolm writes that he was killed by pro-Ustaše members of his militia. Journalist Tim Judah states that his killers were Bosnian Muslims working either for the Ustaše or the Partisans.

== Legacy ==
Miljković is a controversial figure. His followers organized a unit known as the Green Cadre (Zeleni kadar) following his death and joined the Ustaše in carrying out atrocities against Serb civilians. They also committed terrorist acts throughout northwestern Bosnia for several years following the war. Several dozen people were killed in such attacks, which lasted until the last of the outlaws were captured in 1950.

Miljković is buried inside a mosque in Velika Kladuša. Several authors assert that the post-war politician and businessman Fikret Abdić—who led the Autonomous Province of Western Bosnia during the Bosnian War—drew inspiration from him.
