= Glinica =

Glinica may refer to the following places:

In Bosnia and Herzegovina:

- Glinica, Velika Kladuša, a village in Velika Kladuša municipality
- Glinica (river), a tributary of the Glina

In Poland:

- Glinica, Głogów County in Lower Silesian Voivodeship (south-west Poland)
- Glinica, Wrocław County in Lower Silesian Voivodeship (south-west Poland)
- Glinica, Lesser Poland Voivodeship (south Poland)
- Glinica, Silesian Voivodeship (south Poland)

In Slovenia:

- Glinica (Ljubljana), a former settlement in central Slovenia, now part of the city of Ljubljana

== See also ==
- Glinice (disambiguation)
