= Battle of Dolnij Poloj =

WWII war episode

Charge of Poloj
- Part of World War II in Yugoslavia
Date	October 17, 1942
Location	Poloj, municipality of Slunj, Croatia
Result	Italian victory

Belligerents
Italy	Yugoslav Partisans

The Battle of Dolnij Poloj, more commonly known as the Charge of Poloj (in Italian: Carica di Poloj) is a war episode that took place during World War II in the Yugoslav Front on October 17, 1942, which went down in history as the last charge carried out by regular Italian military troops. It takes its name from a locality in Croatia, Gornji Poloj, now a settlement in the municipality of Slunj. The episode saw as protagonists on one side the Regio Esercito, with the 14th Regiment "Cavalleggeri Alessandria" accompanied by other units and commanded by Colonel Antonio Ajmone Cat and on the other the People's Liberation Army of Yugoslavia commanded by Josip Broz Tito. It was the last charge of Italian cavalry in history.

At sunrise on October 17, 1942, the 14th Regiment "Cavalleggeri Alessandria", led by Colonel Antonio Ajmone Cat and supported by a column of horse-drawn artillery, the 3rd Tank Squadron based on L6/40 tanks and the 81st divisional Blackshirt Battalion, was moving towards Mjesto Primišlje on a routine checkpoint operation when, near the Korana river, a handful of Yugoslav partisans fired heavy-calibre shots from the surrounding heights, immediately killing an officer and a light cavalryman and wounding several men and horses, with the 2nd and 4th partisan assault brigades taking possession of the hills above the Italians.

The subsequent charge left the Partisans retreating, at the cost of heavy losses. 70 dead and 61 wounded, including officers, non-commissioned officers and light cavalry out of an effective force of 760 units; 130 horses killed and 60 injured. The artillery, strenuously defended, has 12 missing and one wounded among the troops in addition to the loss of pieces and horses, also including the loss of one battery. The Partisans claimed to seize 33 Italian prisoners, an L3, two guns, seven trucks, nine machine guns, 122 rifles. They also claimed only five killed and eight injured. Yugoslav partisan leader Josep Broz Tito stated about the Poloj Cavalry Charge:

We had the honor of engaging the Cavalleggeri di Alessandria.

— Josip Broz Tito
