= Gornja Slapnica =

- Village
- Location within Bosnia and Herzegovina
- Coordinates: 45.146368°N 15.880851°E
- Country: Bosnia and Herzegovina
- Entity: Federation of Bosnia and Herzegovina
- Canton: Una-Sana
- Municipality: Velika Kladuša

Area
  - Total: 2.63 sq mi (6.82 km^{2})

Population (2013)
  - Total: 573
  - Density: 218/sq mi (84.0/km^{2})
- Time zone: UTC+1 (CET)
  - Summer (DST): UTC+2 (CEST)

Gornja Slapnica is a village in the municipality of Velika Kladuša, Bosnia and Herzegovina.

== Demographics ==
According to the 2013 census, its population was 573.

Ethnicity in 2013
Ethnicity	Number	Percentage
Bosniaks	462	80.5%
Croats	1	0.3%
other/undeclared	110	19.2%
Total	573	100%
