= Čaglica =

- Village
- Location within Bosnia and Herzegovina
- Coordinates: 45.114128°N 15.985570°E
- Country: Bosnia and Herzegovina
- Entity: Federation of Bosnia and Herzegovina
- Canton: Una-Sana
- Municipality: Velika Kladuša

Area
  - Total: 2.33 sq mi (6.04 km^{2})

Population (2013)
  - Total: 608
  - Density: 261/sq mi (101/km^{2})
- Time zone: UTC+1 (CET)
  - Summer (DST): UTC+2 (CEST)

Čaglica is a village in the municipality of Velika Kladuša, Bosnia and Herzegovina.

== Demographics ==
According to the 2013 census, its population was 608.

Ethnicity in 2013
Ethnicity	Number	Percentage
Bosniaks	491	80.8%
Croats	6	1.0%
other/undeclared	111	18.3%
Total	608	100%
