= Gornja Vidovska =

- Village
- Location within Bosnia and Herzegovina
- Coordinates: 45.110008°N 15.819763°E
- Country: Bosnia and Herzegovina
- Entity: Federation of Bosnia and Herzegovina
- Canton: Una-Sana
- Municipality: Velika Kladuša

Area
  - Total: 2.97 sq mi (7.69 km^{2})

Population (2013)
  - Total: 758
  - Density: 255/sq mi (98.6/km^{2})
- Time zone: UTC+1 (CET)
  - Summer (DST): UTC+2 (CEST)

Gornja Vidovska is a village in the municipality of Velika Kladuša, Bosnia and Herzegovina.

== Demographics ==
According to the 2013 census, its population was 758.

Ethnicity in 2013
Ethnicity	Number	Percentage
Bosniaks	564	74.4%
Croats	1	0.1%
other/undeclared	193	25.5%
Total	758	100%
