= Vrnogračka Slapnica =

- Village
- Location within Bosnia and Herzegovina
- Coordinates: 45.158644°N 15.937210°E
- Country: Bosnia and Herzegovina
- Entity: Federation of Bosnia and Herzegovina
- Canton: Una-Sana
- Municipality: Velika Kladuša

Area
  - Total: 1.40 sq mi (3.62 km^{2})

Population (2013)
  - Total: 449
  - Density: 321/sq mi (124/km^{2})
- Time zone: UTC+1 (CET)
  - Summer (DST): UTC+2 (CEST)

Vrnogračka Slapnica is a village in the municipality of Velika Kladuša, Bosnia and Herzegovina.

== Demographics ==
According to the 2013 census, its population was 449.

Ethnicity in 2013
Ethnicity	Number	Percentage
Bosniaks	354	78.8%
Croats	3	0.7%
Serbs	1	0.2%
other/undeclared	91	20.3%
Total	449	100%
