= Lučica =

Lučica may refer to:

- Lučica, Croatia, village near Karlovac, Croatia
- Skrivena Luka, village on the island of Lastovo, Croatia
- Lučica (Požarevac), village in Serbia

== See also ==
- Lučice (disambiguation)
