= Marjanovac =

- Village
- Location within Bosnia and Herzegovina
- Coordinates: 45.123176°N 15.873558°E
- Country: Bosnia and Herzegovina
- Entity: Federation of Bosnia and Herzegovina
- Canton: Una-Sana
- Municipality: Velika Kladuša

Area
  - Total: 2.34 sq mi (6.05 km^{2})

Population (2013)
  - Total: 711
  - Density: 304/sq mi (118/km^{2})
- Time zone: UTC+1 (CET)
  - Summer (DST): UTC+2 (CEST)

Marjanovac is a village in the municipality of Velika Kladuša, Bosnia and Herzegovina.

== Demographics ==
According to the 2013 census, its population was 711.

Ethnicity in 2013
Ethnicity	Number	Percentage
Bosniaks	580	81.6%
Croats	11	1.5%
other/undeclared	120	16.9%
Total	711	100%
