= Glinice =

Glinice may refer to:

- Glinice, Łódź Voivodeship, a village in Poland
- Glinice, Masovian Voivodeship, a village in Poland
- Glinice, Croatia, a village near Cetingrad

== See also ==
- Glinica (disambiguation)
