= Orčeva Luka =

- Village
- Location within Bosnia and Herzegovina
- Coordinates: 45.171490°N 15.897368°E
- Country: Bosnia and Herzegovina
- Entity: Federation of Bosnia and Herzegovina
- Canton: Una-Sana
- Municipality: Velika Kladuša

Area
  - Total: 1.71 sq mi (4.43 km^{2})

Population (2013)
  - Total: 587
  - Density: 343/sq mi (133/km^{2})
- Time zone: UTC+1 (CET)
  - Summer (DST): UTC+2 (CEST)

Orčeva Luka is a village in the municipality of Velika Kladuša, Bosnia and Herzegovina.

== Demographics ==
According to the 2013 census, its population was 587.

Ethnicity in 2013
| Ethnicity | Number | Percentage |
|---|---|---|
| Bosniaks | 459 | 78.2% |
| Croats | 9 | 0.5% |
| other/undeclared | 119 | 20.3% |
| Total | 587 | 100% |
