= Batnoga =

- Location within Croatia
- Coordinates: 45°10′12″N 15°42′00″E
- Country: Croatia
- County: Karlovac
- Municipality: Cetingrad

Area
  - Total: 4.6 km^{2} (1.8 sq mi)

Population (2021)
  - Total: 65
  - Density: 14/km^{2} (37/sq mi)
- Time zone: UTC+1 (CET)
  - Summer (DST): UTC+2 (CEST)

Batnoga is a village in municipality of Cetingrad in Croatia, population 95 (2011). In the 1980s company Agrokomerc from Velika Kladuša in Bosnia built the chicken farm in the Batnoga field. During the Croatian War of Independence the farm was devastated. In 1994 it was used as refugee camp for upwards of 20,000 people from the Autonomous Province of Western Bosnia. Today the main source of income for the local people is breeding of cows, goats and sheep and milk and cheese production.
