= Kumarica =

- Village
- Location within Bosnia and Herzegovina
- Coordinates: 45.165990°N 15.893572°E
- Country: Bosnia and Herzegovina
- Entity: Federation of Bosnia and Herzegovina
- Canton: Una-Sana
- Municipality: Velika Kladuša

Area
  - Total: 2.39 sq mi (6.18 km^{2})

Population (2013)
  - Total: 854
  - Density: 358/sq mi (138/km^{2})
- Time zone: UTC+1 (CET)
  - Summer (DST): UTC+2 (CEST)

Kumarica is a village in the municipality of Velika Kladuša, Bosnia and Herzegovina.

== Demographics ==
According to the 2013 census, its population was 854.

Ethnicity in 2013
Ethnicity	Number	Percentage
Bosniaks	674	78.9%
Croats	7	0.8%
Serbs	1	0.1%
other/undeclared	174	20.1%
Total	854	100%
