= Stabandža =

- Village
- Location within Bosnia and Herzegovina
- Coordinates: 45.125628°N 16.057336°E
- Country: Bosnia and Herzegovina
- Entity: Federation of Bosnia and Herzegovina
- Canton: Una-Sana
- Municipality: Velika Kladuša

Area
  - Total: 8.76 sq mi (22.68 km^{2})

Population (2013)
  - Total: 911
  - Density: 104/sq mi (40.2/km^{2})
- Time zone: UTC+1 (CET)
  - Summer (DST): UTC+2 (CEST)

Stabandža is a village in the municipality of Velika Kladuša, Bosnia and Herzegovina.

== Demographics ==
According to the 2013 census, its population was 911.

Ethnicity in 2013
Ethnicity	Number	Percentage
Bosniaks	814	89.4%
Croats	4	0.4%
Serbs	1	0.1%
other/undeclared	92	10.1%
Total	911	100%
