= Čelinja =

- Village
- Location within Bosnia and Herzegovina
- Coordinates: 45.099732°N 15.962407°E
- Country: Bosnia and Herzegovina
- Entity: Federation of Bosnia and Herzegovina
- Canton: Una-Sana
- Municipality: Velika Kladuša

Area
  - Total: 2.49 sq mi (6.46 km^{2})

Population (2013)
  - Total: 633
  - Density: 254/sq mi (98.0/km^{2})
- Time zone: UTC+1 (CET)
  - Summer (DST): UTC+2 (CEST)

Čelinja is a village in the municipality of Velika Kladuša, Bosnia and Herzegovina.

== Demographics ==
According to the 2013 census, its population was 633.

Ethnicity in 2013
Ethnicity	Number	Percentage
Bosniaks	477	75.4%
Croats	3	0.5%
other/undeclared	153	24.2%
Total	633	100%
