= Trend Radio =

Bosnian radio station

Velika Kladuša; Bosnia and Herzegovina
- Broadcast area: Velika Kladuša
- Frequency: Velika Kladuša 91.6 MHz
- RDS: TREND VK

Programming
- Language: Bosnian language

Ownership
- Owner: NURRAH DOO Velika Kladuša; PJ TREND RADIO Velika Kladuša

History
- First air date: May 2018

Technical information
- Licensing authority: CRA BiH
- Transmitter coordinates: 45°11′N 15°48′E
- Repeater: Velika Kladuša/Stari Grad

Links
- Webcast: Listen Live
- Website: www.trendradio.ba

Trend Radio is a Bosnian local commercial radio station, broadcasting from Velika Kladuša, Bosnia and Herzegovina.

This radio station broadcasts a variety of programs such as music, talk show and local news. The owner of the radio station is the company NURRAH D.O.O. Velika Kladuša - PJ TREND RADIO Velika Kladuša.

Program is mainly produced in Bosnian language at one FM frequency (Velika Kladuša 91.6 MHz ) and it is available in the Velika Kladuša area and in neighboring Croatia.

Estimated number of listeners of Trend Radio is around 22.389.

== Frequencies ==
- Velika Kladuša 91.6 MHz

== See also ==
- List of radio stations in Bosnia and Herzegovina
- Radio Bihać
- Novi Radio Bihać
- Radio Cazin
- Radio Bosanska Krupa
- Radio USK
- Radio Velkaton
