= Klupe =

- Village
- Location within Bosnia and Herzegovina
- Coordinates: 45.191526°N 15.858102°E
- Country: Bosnia and Herzegovina
- Entity: Federation of Bosnia and Herzegovina
- Canton: Una-Sana
- Municipality: Velika Kladuša

Area
  - Total: 0.95 sq mi (2.45 km^{2})

Population (2013)
  - Total: 392
  - Density: 414/sq mi (160/km^{2})
- Time zone: UTC+1 (CET)
  - Summer (DST): UTC+2 (CEST)

Klupe is a village in the municipality of Velika Kladuša, Bosnia and Herzegovina.

== Demographics ==
According to the 2013 census, its population was 392.

Ethnicity in 2013
Ethnicity	Number	Percentage
Bosniaks	308	78.6%
other/undeclared	84	21.4%
Total	392	100%
