= Nepeke =

- Village
- Location within Bosnia and Herzegovina
- Coordinates: 45.168117°N 15.816996°E
- Country: Bosnia and Herzegovina
- Entity: Federation of Bosnia and Herzegovina
- Canton: Una-Sana
- Municipality: Velika Kladuša

Area
  - Total: 1.49 sq mi (3.87 km^{2})

Population (2013)
  - Total: 601
  - Density: 402/sq mi (155/km^{2})
- Time zone: UTC+1 (CET)
  - Summer (DST): UTC+2 (CEST)

Nepeke is a village in the municipality of Velika Kladuša, Bosnia and Herzegovina.

== Demographics ==
According to the 2013 census, its population was 601.

Ethnicity in 2013
Ethnicity	Number	Percentage
Bosniaks	406	67.6%
Croats	29	4.8%
Serbs	3	0.5%
other/undeclared	163	27.1%
Total	601	100%
