= Šmrekovac =

- Village
- Location within Bosnia and Herzegovina
- Coordinates: 45.169813°N 15.772326°E
- Country: Bosnia and Herzegovina
- Entity: Federation of Bosnia and Herzegovina
- Canton: Una-Sana
- Municipality: Velika Kladuša

Area
  - Total: 1.73 sq mi (4.47 km^{2})

Population (2013)
  - Total: 288
  - Density: 167/sq mi (64.4/km^{2})
- Time zone: UTC+1 (CET)
  - Summer (DST): UTC+2 (CEST)

Šmrekovac is a village in the municipality of Velika Kladuša, Bosnia and Herzegovina. It is located close to the Croatian border.

== Demographics ==
According to the 2013 census, its population was 288.

Ethnicity in 2013
Ethnicity	Number	Percentage
Bosniaks	140	48.6%
Croats	115	39.9%
Muslims	16	5.56%
other/undeclared	17	5.90%
Total	288	100%
