= Zalik =

Neighborhood of Mostar, Bosnia and Herzegovina

- Neighborhood
- Location within Bosnia and Herzegovina
- Coordinates: 43°21′29″N 17°48′53″E
- Country: Bosnia and Herzegovina
- Entity: Federation of Bosnia and Herzegovina
- Canton: Herzegovina-Neretva
- Municipality: City of Mostar
- Time zone: UTC+1 (CET)
  - Summer (DST): UTC+2 (CEST)
- Postal code: 88000 (Same as Mostar)
- Area code: (+387) 36

Zalik is a neighborhood in the City of Mostar, Bosnia and Herzegovina. It is part of the Northern metropolitan area.

Zalik is located in the northern part of the city. In the south, it borders the Carina neighborhood, in the west Centar II and Rudnik, whereas in the north the Vrapčići suburb is located. In the east, there is the Podveležje village of Gornje Gnojnice.

Zalik itself is made up of Gornji Zalik ("Upper Zalik"), Pasjak and Abazovina.

== Geography ==
Zalik is situated in the northern city area, on the east bank of the Neretva river.

Its southern border is formed by the Ivan Krndelj Square, where the Carina neighborhood begins. In the east, Zalik streches all the way to a location called "Strelište" (in eng. "shooting range") between the Fortica and Kandiljan mountains, and in the west to the Neretva river. The northern end of the neighborhood, and the city area itself, is located at the junction of the Marshal Tito street and the M-17 freeway.

The western part of Zalik, especially Abazovina, is dominated by flat land, whereas the eastern Gornji Zalik is very mountainous.

Through this neighborhood go the Marshal Tito street (locally called "Main street" as it is the longest road in the city), the 29. Herzegovina division street and the M-17 freeway. There is also the Student Bridge that connects the northern neighborhoods on both sides of the Neretva river.

== History ==
Until the beginning of the Austro-Hungarian occupation of Bosnia in 1878, the majority of the land in Zalik was owned by the Abaza gentry family. Until today, that very part of the neighborhood is called Abazovina, in reference to its historic owners. It encompasses mainly the flat part of the area along the Neretva river.

Upon their arrival, Austria-Hungary constructed military barracks there as part of their efforts of fortifying the city. They named it "Northern camp" (in Bosn. "Sjeverni logor"), in parallel with the Southern camp in Bišće polje, the Western camp in Bijeli brijeg and the Eastern camp in the Podveležje region. The area around the former complex bears that name even today, alongside to Abazovina. The construction of the military complex is a very important milestone in Zalik's history, as it will dominate most of its future history and development.

Mostar and Bosnia and Herzegovina were part of the Kingdom of Yugoslavia between 1918 and 1945, and the socialist Yugoslavia between 1945 and 1992. The Royal Yugoslav army and the Yugoslav People's Army (bosn. "Jugoslovenska narodna armija", JNA) respectively, kept on using the barracks. During the period of socialist Yugoslavia, Zalik experienced an enormous expansion in urban development. A lot of apartment buildings were built, as well as a residential area in the area of Gornji Zalik.

Zalik also had a very important role during the Bosnian war. On April 3rd, 1992, a big explosion hit the military barracks, still used by the by then Serb dominated JNA. A bomb was planted on a nearby cistern, killing three people. After months of high tensions in Mostar, this event is widely regarded as having sparked the beginning of open fighting in this part of the Herzegovina region.

In the next months, the Yugoslav people's army kept control of the barracks and this part of Mostar. Later on, it handed its positions to the Army of Republika Srpska (bosn. Vojska Republike Srpske, VRS), the military forces of the Bosnian Serb separatists. In June 1992, however, joint Bosnian-Croat forces of the Bosnian state army (Armija Republike Bosne i Hercegovine, ARBiH), the Croatian Defence Council (the army of the Bosnian Croats, Croat. Hrvatsko vijeće obrane or HVO) and the Croatian state army managed to retake Zalik during the Operation "June dawns" (Lipanjske zore) and put it under control of the newly formed and internationally recognized Bosnian state.

Only one year later, Zalik was to become an open battleground again. After the HVO attacked the Bosnian state army on the 9th of May 1993, wanting the city to become a part of their own Croat dominated separatist republic rather than a unified Bosnian state, they kicked the ARBiH out of the part of the town they took control of. By controlling the Sjeverni logor area and most of Zalik, they put the state controlled part of Mostar under a blockade. On June 30, 1993, though, the ARBiH launched a successful operation to deblockade the city, liberating Zalik and the northern suburbs.

After the end of the war in 1995, the military use of the barracks was ended. Today, the complex and the area surrounding it represent the backbone of Zalik's post-war urban development. Most of the complex itself was renovated and is used by the Džemal Bijedić University, the main university of Mostar. It's further work in the western HVO-controlled neighborhood of Bijeli Brijeg, was forbidden after the war with Bosnian state forces in 1993 erupted, so it had to relocate to Zalik.

In the era of modern Bosnia and Herzegovina, Zalik saw a continuation of its ongoing urban development. A number of new residential buildings, city parks, schools and other public facilities were built. In 2019, a new bridge was opened that directly connects the two Neretva river banks in this very part of the Mostar city area. Zalik's main project for the future is the construction of a new residential area in the remaining free area around the former Sjeverni logor military complex, alongside the Neretva river.

== Infrastructure ==
The main roads in Zalik are the Marshal Tito street (Ulica Maršala Tita) and the M-17 freeway. In the Mostar city area, the M-17 road has an official street name. It's referred to as the 29. Herzegovinian division street (Ulica 29. hercegovačke udarne divizije). These two routes connect the north and the south of the neighborhood.

The main east-west axis is formed by the X. Herzegovinian division Street (Ulica X. Hercegovačke brigade) and the road between Zalik and Rudnik. The first is located right between Zalik and the northern neighborhood of Carina, connecting the eastern part of the town with the Centar II neighborhood on the other side of the Neretva via the Carina Bridge. The latter, however, leads to the Students bridge that represents a link between Zalik and Rudnik, another neighborhood in the northern part of the western river bank.

The Sarajevo-Ploče railway also goes through Zalik. The main railway and bus station are in close proximity.

The "Northern camp" (Sjeverni logor) bus station functions as the main terminal for most of Mostar's bus lines. Therefore, is it possible to reach almost all other parts of the city by public transport. There are also direct lines towards the suburbs east of Mostar, as well as Raštani and Vojno in the west.

=== Public facilities ===
The most noteworthy institution in the northern part of Mostar is the "Džemal Bijedić" University of Mostar. In the Abazovina area, the main post office of Mostar, as well as the Medical school and the Second Gymnasium of the city are to be found.

In June 2022, a new mosque in Upper Zalik was opened.
