= Vejinac =

- Village
- Location within Bosnia and Herzegovina
- Coordinates: 45.095611°N 15.887017°E
- Country: Bosnia and Herzegovina
- Entity: Federation of Bosnia and Herzegovina
- Canton: Una-Sana
- Municipality: Velika Kladuša

Area
  - Total: 3.02 sq mi (7.83 km^{2})

Population (2013)
  - Total: 984
  - Density: 325/sq mi (126/km^{2})
- Time zone: UTC+1 (CET)
  - Summer (DST): UTC+2 (CEST)

Vejinac is a village in the municipality of Velika Kladuša, Bosnia and Herzegovina.

== Demographics ==
According to the 2013 census, its population was 984.

Ethnicity in 2013
Ethnicity	Number	Percentage
Bosniaks	725	73.7%
Croats	6	0.6%
other/undeclared	253	25.7%
Total	984	100%
