= Ponikve, Velika Kladuša =

Ponikve
- Village
- Location within Bosnia and Herzegovina
- Coordinates: 45.208004°N 15.852145°E
- Country: Bosnia and Herzegovina
- Entity: Federation of Bosnia and Herzegovina
- Canton: Una-Sana
- Municipality: Velika Kladuša

Area
  - Total: 3.12 sq mi (8.08 km^{2})

Population (2013)
  - Total: 844
  - Density: 271/sq mi (104/km^{2})
- Time zone: UTC+1 (CET)
  - Summer (DST): UTC+2 (CEST)

Ponikve is a village in the municipality of Velika Kladuša, Bosnia and Herzegovina.

== Demographics ==
According to the 2013 census, its population was 844.

Ethnicity in 2013
Ethnicity	Number	Percentage
Bosniaks	776	91.9%
Serbs	2	0.2%
other/undeclared	66	7.8%
Total	844	100%
