= Kudići =

- Village
- Location within Bosnia and Herzegovina
- Coordinates: 45.080922°N 15.823101°E
- Country: Bosnia and Herzegovina
- Entity: Federation of Bosnia and Herzegovina
- Canton: Una-Sana
- Municipality: Velika Kladuša

Area
  - Total: 4.54 sq mi (11.76 km^{2})

Population (2013)
  - Total: 1,037
  - Density: 228.4/sq mi (88.18/km^{2})
- Time zone: UTC+1 (CET)
  - Summer (DST): UTC+2 (CEST)

Kudići is a village in the municipality of Velika Kladuša, Bosnia and Herzegovina.

== Demographics ==
According to the 2013 census, its population was 1,037.

Ethnicity in 2013
Ethnicity	Number	Percentage
Bosniaks	834	80.4%
Croats	1	0.1%
other/undeclared	202	19.5%
Total	1,037	100%
