= Carevo Selo =

Carevo Selo may refer to:

- Carevo Selo, North Macedonia, the former name of Delčevo
- Carevo Selo, Croatia, a village near Barilović
