= Šabići, Velika Kladuša =

Šabići
- Village
- Location within Bosnia and Herzegovina
- Coordinates: 45.079362°N 15.875120°E
- Country: Bosnia and Herzegovina
- Entity: Federation of Bosnia and Herzegovina
- Canton: Una-Sana
- Municipality: Velika Kladuša

Area
  - Total: 2.65 sq mi (6.86 km^{2})

Population (2013)
  - Total: 882
  - Density: 333/sq mi (129/km^{2})
- Time zone: UTC+1 (CET)
  - Summer (DST): UTC+2 (CEST)

Šabići is a village in the municipality of Velika Kladuša, Bosnia and Herzegovina.

== Demographics ==
According to the 2013 census, its population was 882.

Ethnicity in 2013
Ethnicity	Number	Percentage
Bosniaks	584	66.2%
Croats	23	2.6%
other/undeclared	275	31.2%
Total	882	100%
