= Donja Slapnica =

- Village
- Location within Bosnia and Herzegovina
- Coordinates: 45.162433°N 15.927190°E
- Country: Bosnia and Herzegovina
- Entity: Federation of Bosnia and Herzegovina
- Canton: Una-Sana
- Municipality: Velika Kladuša

Area
  - Total: 0.86 sq mi (2.24 km^{2})

Population (2013)
  - Total: 476
  - Density: 550/sq mi (212/km^{2})
- Time zone: UTC+1 (CET)
  - Summer (DST): UTC+2 (CEST)

Donja Slapnica is a village in the municipality of Velika Kladuša, Bosnia and Herzegovina.

== Demographics ==
According to the 2013 census, its population was 476.

Ethnicity in 2013
Ethnicity	Number	Percentage
Bosniaks	397	83.4%
Croats	1	0.2%
other/undeclared	78	16.4%
Total	476	100%
