= Mrcelji =

- Village
- Location within Bosnia and Herzegovina
- Coordinates: 45.073011°N 15.947198°E
- Country: Bosnia and Herzegovina
- Entity: Federation of Bosnia and Herzegovina
- Canton: Una-Sana
- Municipality: Velika Kladuša

Area
  - Total: 3.11 sq mi (8.06 km^{2})

Population (2013)
  - Total: 824
  - Density: 265/sq mi (102/km^{2})
- Time zone: UTC+1 (CET)
  - Summer (DST): UTC+2 (CEST)

Mrcelji is a village in the municipality of Velika Kladuša, Bosnia and Herzegovina.

== Demographics ==
According to the 2013 census, its population was 824.

Ethnicity in 2013
| Ethnicity | Number | Percentage |
|---|---|---|
| Bosniaks | 752 | 91.3% |
| Croats | 7 | 0.8% |
| other/undeclared | 65 | 7.9% |
| Total | 824 | 100% |
