= Lučice =

Lučice may refer to:

- Lučice, Fojnica, a village in Bosnia and Herzegovina
- Lučice (Havlíčkův Brod District), a village in Czech Republic
- Lučice, Serbia, a village near Prijepolje
- Lučice, Croatia, a village near Delnice

== See also ==
- Lučica (disambiguation)
