= Donja Brusovača =

Coordinates: 45°13′N 15°44′E

Donja Brusovača Доња Брусовача (Serbian)
- Village
- Interactive map of Donja Brusovača
- Croatia: Croatia
- County: Karlovac County
- Municipality: Vojnić

Area
  - Total: 3.6 km^{2} (1.4 sq mi)

Population (2021)
  - Total: 89
  - Density: 25/km^{2} (64/sq mi)
- Time zone: UTC+1 (CET)
  - Summer (DST): UTC+2 (CEST)
- Postal code: 47220
- Area code: 47

Donja Brusovača (Serbo-Croatian Cyrillic: Доња Брусивача) is a village in central Croatia, located in the Vojnić municipality in Karlovac County. It is located on the D216 road, which connects Vojnić to the Maljevac border crossing into Bosnia and Herzegovina. The village is located 8 kilometres away from the border.

According to the 2001 census, Donja Brusovača has 116 residents and 38 households. The 2011 census reports 122 residents, an increase of 6. The village has a mostly Serb population.
