= Barilović =

Village in Karlovac County, Croatia

- Municipality
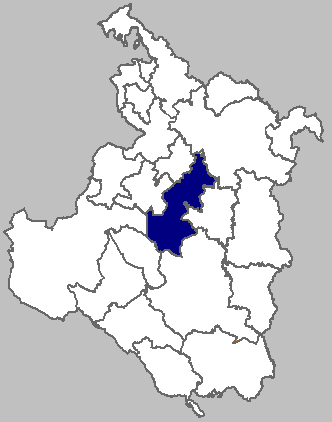
- Location of Barilović municipality within Karlovac County

- Location within Croatia
- Country: Croatia
- County: Karlovac County

Area
  - Total: 2.1 sq mi (5.4 km^{2})

Population (2021)
  - Total: 295
  - Density: 140/sq mi (55/km^{2})
- Time zone: UTC+1 (CET)
  - Summer (DST): UTC+2 (CEST)
- Postal code: 47252 Barilović
- Area code: 047

Barilović is a village and a municipality in central Croatia, in the Karlovac County.

== Geography ==
The karst dolines surrounding the slopes of the hill above Križ Koranski bear the collective name Ponikve.

== History ==
During the Gomirje conflict, Lord Barilović had raised the issue of Vlach soldiers taking over their castle at the Pressburg Diet of 1604, which decided in his favour against the General of Karlovac, Veit Khisl. Khisl defended his actions with a narration of events from his perspective. Since the Barilović family could no longer maintain the castle against "the enemy's daily attacks" (German: des feindes taglichen einrechen), they decided to set it on fire rather than give credit to the haramije who had previously defended it. So the castle of Barilović stood deserted for a long time, but finally, General Khisl decided to confiscate it becaus it was located on a ford. When Lord Barilović found out, he improved its gate and kept a poor serf in it, asking Khisl to hand over the haramije sent by Khisl to guard it to his control. When Khisl replied that he could not do that for important reasons, they recalled their serf from the castle and left it deserted. Khisl then occupied it, contrary to Barilović's accusations not using newly settled Vlachs but those of a previous settlement, who had previously served as haramije on the Mrežnica. Khisl thus denied the accusation that his "Karlovac" soldiers had raided Barilović's villages, harming their subjects.

In the 16th century, Barilović became a part of the Austrian Military Frontier, with its own Barilović Capitanate. Known captains include:

1. Jakov Zemlić (1615)
2. Juraj Zemlić (1620)
3. Péter IV Erdődy (1625)
4. Vuk Colnić (1630)
5. Pavao Colnić (1651–1664)
6. Ivan Franjo Oršić (1664)
7. Johann Adam von Purgstall (1679)
8. Vilim Kušljan (1689)
9. Ferdinand von Herberstein (1689)
10. Otto von Herberstein (1698)
11. Janko Fridrik Budački (1701)
12. Johann Jakob von Hallerstein (1711–1717)
13. Franjo Josip Turn (1719–1732)

== Demographics ==
In 1890, the obćina of Barilović (court at Barilović), with an area of 108 square kilometres (42 mi^{2}), belonged to the kotar of Vojnić (Vojnić electoral district but Krnjak court) in the županija of Modruš-Rieka (Ogulin court and financial board). There were 927 houses, with a population of 6220: 3019 male and 3201 female. The majority were Croatian or Serbian speakers, but 5 spoke Slovene, 4 spoke German and 1 Hungarian. The majority were Catholic, but 546 were Eastern Orthodox. Its 32 villages were divided for taxation purposes into 6 porezne obćine, under the Slunj office.

According to the 2021 census, its population was 2,673 with 295 living in the town proper.

In 2011 there were a total of 2,990 inhabitants in the municipality, 87.29% of which were ethnic Croats and 11.84% were ethnic Serbs. The village itself was inhabited by 300 people.

The Census 2001 recorded the name of the municipality as Barilovići.

=== Settlements ===
According to the 2011 census, the municipality consists of the following settlements:

- Banjsko Selo, population 144
- Barilović, population 300
- Belaj, population 168
- Belajske Poljice, population 597
- Belajski Malinci, population 33
- Carevo Selo, population 29
- Cerovac Barilovićki, population 110
- Donja Perjasica, population 14
- Donji Skrad, population 19
- Donji Velemerić, population 155
- Gaćeško Selo, population 6
- Gornji Poloj, population 0
- Gornji Velemerić, population 108
- Kestenak, population 4
- Koranska Strana, population 11
- Koranski Brijeg, population 94
- Koransko Selo, population 33
- Kosijersko Selo, population 39
- Križ Koranski, population 44
- Leskovac Barilovićki, population 129
- Lučica, population 38
- Mala Kosa, population 5
- Mali Kozinac, population 29
- Marlovac, population 10
- Maurovići, population 7
- Miloševac, population 3
- Mrežnica, population 4
- Novi Dol, population 0
- Novo Selo Perjasičko, population 1
- Orijevac, population 3
- Perjasica, population 17
- Podvožić, population 298
- Ponorac Perjasički, population 17
- Potplaninsko, population 7
- Siča, population 154
- Srednji Poloj, population 12
- Svojić, population 46
- Šćulac, population 134
- Štirkovac, population 5
- Točak Perjasički, population 1
- Veliki Kozinac, population 1
- Vijenac Barilovićki, population 68
- Zinajevac, population 4
- Žabljak, population 58

== Infrastructure ==
In 1913, there were 6 gendarmeries in Vojnić kotar: Barilović, Krnjak, Krstinja, Perjasica, Vojnić and Vukmanić.

== Bibliography ==
- Kruhek, Milan (1976). Stari gradovi između Kupe i Korane [Old Castles Between the Kupa and the Korana] (PDF) (in Croatian).
