= Šiljkovača =

- Village
- Location within Bosnia and Herzegovina
- Coordinates: 45.146398°N 15.792725°E
- Country: Bosnia and Herzegovina
- Entity: Federation of Bosnia and Herzegovina
- Canton: Una-Sana
- Municipality: Velika Kladuša

Area
  - Total: 2.80 sq mi (7.24 km^{2})

Population (2013)
  - Total: 425
  - Density: 152/sq mi (58.7/km^{2})
- Time zone: UTC+1 (CET)
  - Summer (DST): UTC+2 (CEST)

Šiljkovača is a village in the municipality of Velika Kladuša, Bosnia and Herzegovina.

== Demographics ==
According to the 2013 census, its population was 425.

Ethnicity in 2013
Ethnicity	Number	Percentage
Bosniaks	346	81.4%
Croats	36	8.5%
other/undeclared	43	10.1%
Total	425	100%
