= Vojišnica =

Vojišnica Војишница (Serbian)
- Village
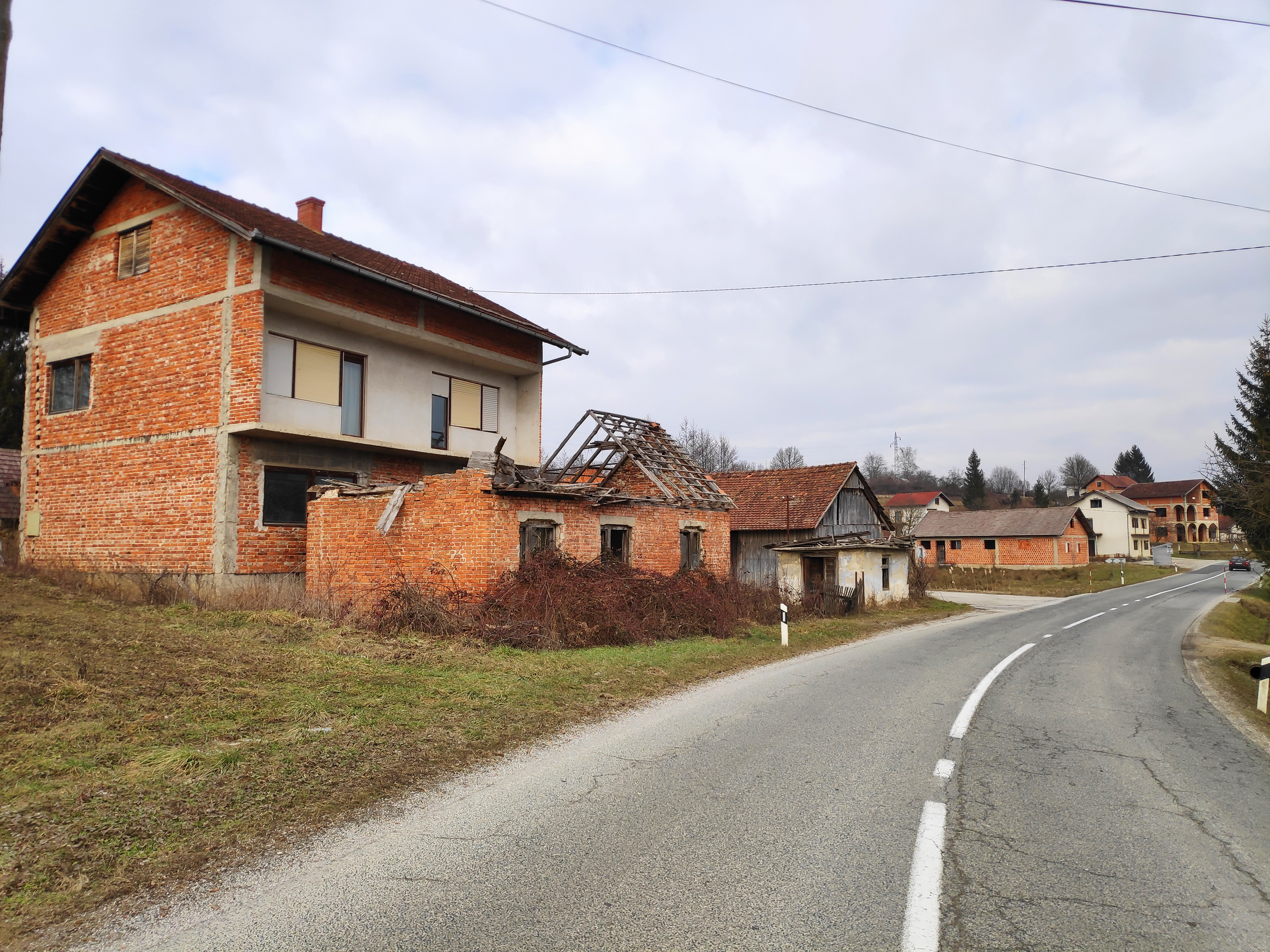

- Location of Vojišnica in Croatia
- Coordinates: 45°20′18″N 15°43′22″E
- Country: Croatia
- County: Karlovac
- Municipality: Vojnić

Area
  - Total: 11.5 km^{2} (4.4 sq mi)
- Elevation: 178 m (584 ft)

Population (2021)
  - Total: 314
  - Density: 27.3/km^{2} (70.7/sq mi)
- Time zone: UTC+1 (CET)
  - Summer (DST): UTC+2 (CEST)
- Postal code: 47220 Vojnić
- Area code: (+385) 47

Vojišnica (Serbian Cyrillic: Војишница) is a village in central Croatia, in the municipality of Vojnić, Karlovac County. It is connected by the D6 highway.

== History ==
During World War II, a large number of Serbs were massacred in the village by the Ustaše regime in June and July 1941.

== Demographics ==
According to the 2011 census, the village of Kolarić has 404 inhabitants. This represents 63.52% of its pre-war population according to the 1991 census.

The 1991 census recorded that 97.17% of the village population were ethnic Serbs (618/636), 1.25% were Yugoslavs (8/636), 0.62% were Croats (4/636) and 0.96% were of other/unknown ethnic origin (6/636).

Historical population 1857-2011
v

population	469	485	438	542	617	661	633	684	500	554	506	534	627	636	565	404
	1857	1869	1880	1890	1900	1910	1921	1931	1948	1953	1961	1971	1981	1991	2001	2011

Sources: Croatian Bureau of Statistics publications
