= Kupljensko =

Kupljensko Купљенско (Serbian)
- Village
- Location of Kupljensko in Croatia
- Coordinates: 45°18′00″N 15°42′00″E
- Country: Croatia
- County: Karlovac County
- Municipality: Vojnić

Area
  - Total: 11.6 km^{2} (4.5 sq mi)
- Elevation: 149 m (489 ft)

Population (2021)
  - Total: 205
  - Density: 17.7/km^{2} (45.8/sq mi)
- Time zone: UTC+1 (CET)
  - Summer (DST): UTC+2 (CEST)
- Postal code: 47220 Vojnić
- Area code: (+385) 47

Kupljensko (Serbian Cyrillic: Купљенско) is a village in central Croatia, in the municipality of Vojnić, Karlovac County. It is connected by the D216 highway.

== Demographics ==
According to the 2011 census, the village of Kupljensko has 317 inhabitants. This represents 61.20% of its pre-war population according to the 1991 census.

The 1991 census recorded that 97.68% of the village population were ethnic Serbs (506/518), 0.77% were Yugoslavs (4/518), 0.39% were Croats (2/518) and 1.16% were Bosniaks (6/518).

Historical population 1857–2011
v

population	730	702	648	793	838	883	905	1026	649	736	672	631	600	518	334	317
	1857	1869	1880	1890	1900	1910	1921	1931	1948	1953	1961	1971	1981	1991	2001	2011

Sources: Croatian Bureau of Statistics publications
