= Živković Kosa =

Živković Kosa Живковић Коса (Serbian)
- Village
- Location of Živković Kosa in Croatia
- Coordinates: 45°21′40″N 15°40′16″E
- Country: Croatia
- County: Karlovac County
- Municipality: Vojnić

Area
  - Total: 4.4 km^{2} (1.7 sq mi)

Population (2021)
  - Total: 84
  - Density: 19/km^{2} (49/sq mi)
- Time zone: UTC+1 (CET)
  - Summer (DST): UTC+2 (CEST)
- Postal code: 47220 Vojnić
- Area code: (+385) 47

Živković Kosa (Serbian Cyrillic: Живковић Коса) is a village in central Croatia, in the municipality of Vojnić, Karlovac County. It is connected by the D6 highway.

== Demographics ==
According to the 2011 census, the village of Živković Kosa has 119 inhabitants. This represents 58.91% of its pre-war population according to the 1991 census.

The 1991 census recorded that 87.62% of the village population were ethnic Serbs (177/202), 4.46% were Yugoslavs (9/202), 2.48% were Croats (5/202) and 5.44% were of other/unknown ethnic origin (11/202).

Historical population 1857–2011
v

population	216	228	231	282	277	266	236	313	225	240	226	214	206	202	164	119
	1857	1869	1880	1890	1900	1910	1921	1931	1948	1953	1961	1971	1981	1991	2001	2011

Sources: Croatian Bureau of Statistics publications
