= Jagrovac =

Coordinates: 45°13′N 15°45′E

Jagrovac Јагровац (Serbian)
- Village
- Interactive map of Jagrovac
- Country: Croatia
- County: Karlovac County
- Municipality: Vojnić

Area
  - Total: 1.2 sq mi (3.0 km^{2})

Population (2021)
  - Total: 30
  - Density: 26/sq mi (10/km^{2})
- Time zone: UTC+1 (CET)
  - Summer (DST): UTC+2 (CEST)

Jagrovac (Serbian Cyrillic: Јагровац) is a village in Croatia. It is connected by the D216 highway.
