= Trnovi, Bosnia and Herzegovina =

Trnovi
- Village
- Location within Bosnia and Herzegovina
- Coordinates: 45.184791°N 15.830588°E
- Country: Bosnia and Herzegovina
- Entity: Federation of Bosnia and Herzegovina
- Canton: Una-Sana
- Municipality: Velika Kladuša

Area
  - Total: 3.35 sq mi (8.67 km^{2})

Population (2013)
  - Total: 1,793
  - Density: 536/sq mi (207/km^{2})
- Time zone: UTC+1 (CET)
  - Summer (DST): UTC+2 (CEST)

Trnovi is a village in the municipality of Velika Kladuša, Bosnia and Herzegovina.

== Demographics ==
According to the 2013 census, its population was 1,793.

Ethnicity in 2013
Ethnicity	Number	Percentage
Bosniaks	1,499	83.6%
Croats	8	0.4%
other/undeclared	286	16.0%
Total	1,793	100%
