= Miholjsko =

Miholjsko Михољско (Serbian)
- Village
- Location of Miholjsko in Croatia
- Coordinates: 45°16′00″N 15°41′00″E
- Country: Croatia
- County: Karlovac County
- Municipality: Vojnić

Area
  - Total: 6.6 km^{2} (2.5 sq mi)

Population (2021)
  - Total: 87
  - Density: 13/km^{2} (34/sq mi)
- Time zone: UTC+1 (CET)
  - Summer (DST): UTC+2 (CEST)
- Postal code: 47220 Vojnić
- Area code: (+385) 47

Miholjsko (Serbian Cyrillic: Михољско) is a village in central Croatia, in the municipality of Vojnić, Karlovac County. It is connected by the D216 highway.

== Demographics ==
According to the 2011 census, the village of Miholjsko has 123 inhabitants. This represents 41.28% of its pre-war population according to the 1991 census.

The 1991 census recorded that 98.99% of the village population were ethnic Serbs (295/298), 0.67% were Croats (2/298), and 0.33% were of other/unknown ethnic origin (1/298).

Historical population 1857–2011
v

population	513	572	559	555	588	561	576	691	427	505	467	396	363	298	92	123
	1857	1869	1880	1890	1900	1910	1921	1931	1948	1953	1961	1971	1981	1991	2001	2011

Sources: Croatian Bureau of Statistics publications
