= Knežević Kosa =

Knežević Kosa Кнежевић Коса (Serbian)
- Village
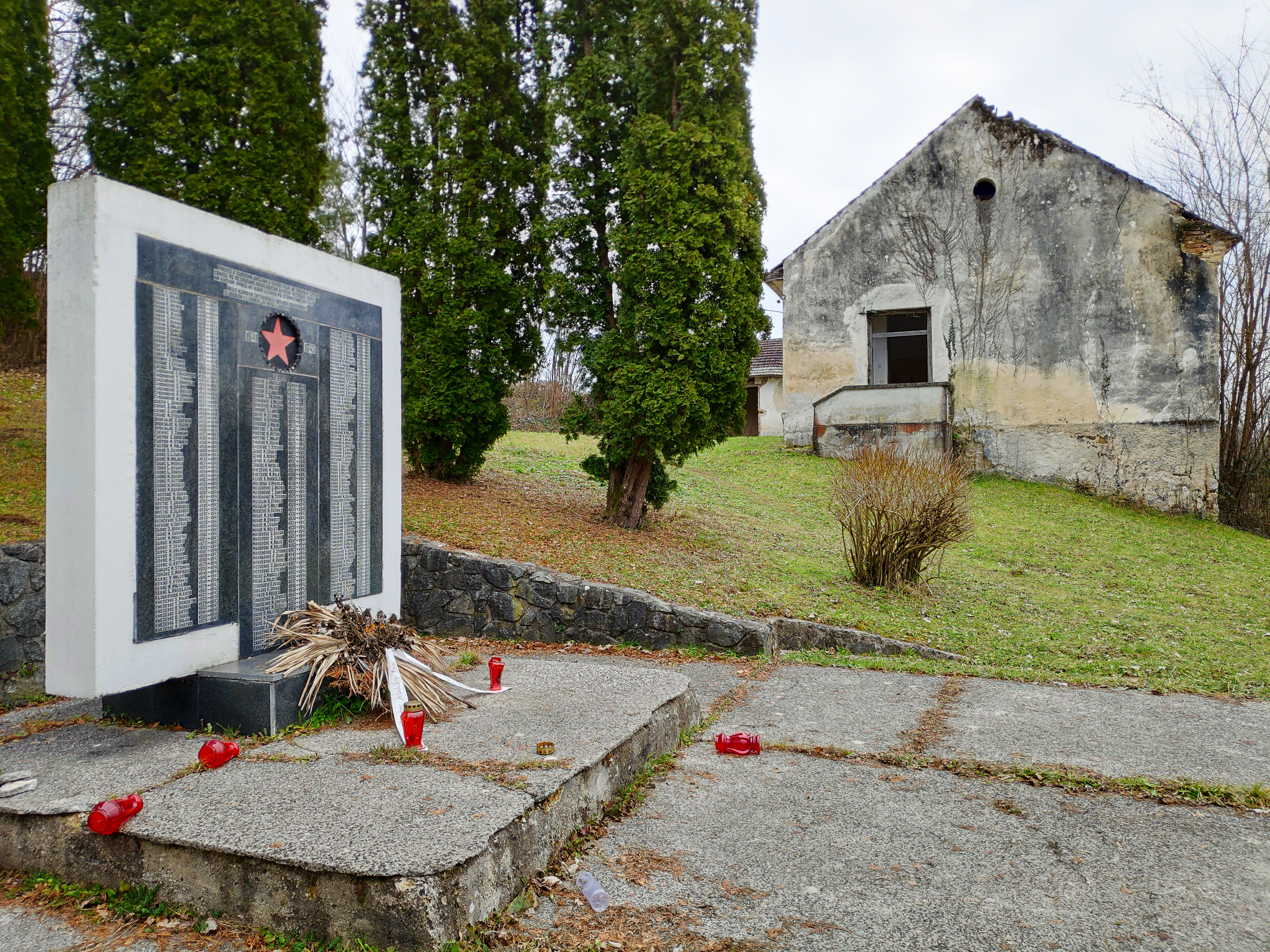

- Location of Knežević Kosa in Croatia
- Coordinates: 45°20′42″N 15°41′02″E
- Country: Croatia
- County: Karlovac County
- Municipality: Vojnić

Area
  - Total: 4.3 km^{2} (1.7 sq mi)

Population (2021)
  - Total: 120
  - Density: 28/km^{2} (72/sq mi)
- Time zone: UTC+1 (CET)
  - Summer (DST): UTC+2 (CEST)
- Postal code: 47220 Vojnić
- Area code: (+385) 47

Knežević Kosa (Serbian Cyrillic: Кнежевић Коса) is a village in central Croatia, in the municipality of Vojnić, Karlovac County. It is connected by the D6 highway.

== Demographics ==
According to the 2011 census, the village of Knežević Kosa has 119 inhabitants. This represents 69.19% of its pre-war population according to the 1991 census.

The 1991 census recorded that 99.41% of the village population were ethnic Serbs (171/172) and 0.59% were of other/unknown ethnic origin (1/172).

Historical population 1857–2011
v

population	202	215	162	221	213	221	208	266	207	213	211	195	174	172	135	119
	1857	1869	1880	1890	1900	1910	1921	1931	1948	1953	1961	1971	1981	1991	2001	2011

Sources: Croatian Bureau of Statistics publications

== Sights ==
- Memorial to the victims of fascism and fallen partisans in WW2
