= Banjsko Selo =

- Village
- Location within Croatia
- Coordinates: 45.4193819°N 15.5254647°E
- Country: Croatia
- County: Karlovac County
- Municipality: Barilović

Area
  - Total: 1.1 sq mi (2.8 km^{2})

Population (2021)
  - Total: 144
  - Density: 130/sq mi (51/km^{2})
- Time zone: UTC+1 (CET)
  - Summer (DST): UTC+2 (CEST)
- Postal code: 47250 Duga Resa
- Area code: 047

Banjsko Selo is a village in the municipality of Barilović, Croatia.

== Demographics ==
According to the 2021 census, its population was 144.
