= Ključar =

Ključar Кључар (Serbian)
- Village
- Location of Ključar in Croatia
- Coordinates: 45°19′52″N 15°45′43″E
- Country: Croatia
- County: Karlovac
- Municipality: Vojnić

Area
  - Total: 8.4 km^{2} (3.2 sq mi)
- Elevation: 265 m (869 ft)

Population (2021)
  - Total: 55
  - Density: 6.5/km^{2} (17/sq mi)
- Time zone: UTC+1 (CET)
  - Summer (DST): UTC+2 (CEST)
- Postal code: 47220 Vojnić
- Area code: (+385) 47

Ključar (Serbian Cyrillic: Кључар) is a village in central Croatia, in the municipality of Vojnić, Karlovac County. It is connected by the D6 highway.

== Demographics ==
According to the 2011 census, the village of Ključar has 86 inhabitants. This represents 71.67% of its pre-war population according to the 1991 census.

The 1991 census recorded that 97.50% of the village population were ethnic Serbs (117/120), 1.67% were Yugoslavs (2/120) and 0.83% were of other/unknown ethnic origin (1/120).

Historical population 1857-2011
v

population	134	150	143	172	158	155	179	216	131	158	160	155	140	120	101	86
	1857	1869	1880	1890	1900	1910	1921	1931	1948	1953	1961	1971	1981	1991	2001	2011

Sources: Croatian Bureau of Statistics publications

== Sights ==
- Memorial to the victims of fascism and fallen partisans in WW2
