= Kolarić =

Kolarić Коларић (Serbian)
- Village
- Location of Kolarić in Croatia
- Coordinates: 45°19′00″N 15°41′00″E
- Country: Croatia
- County: Karlovac
- Municipality: Vojnić

Area
  - Total: 4.8 km^{2} (1.9 sq mi)
- Elevation: 178 m (584 ft)

Population (2021)
  - Total: 163
  - Density: 34/km^{2} (88/sq mi)
- Time zone: UTC+1 (CET)
  - Summer (DST): UTC+2 (CEST)
- Postal code: 47220 Vojnić
- Area code: (+385) 47

Kolarić (Serbian Cyrillic: Коларић) is a village in central Croatia, in the municipality of Vojnić, Karlovac County. It is connected by the D216 highway.

== Demographics ==
According to the 2011 census, the village of Kolarić has 195 inhabitants. This represents 78% of its pre-war population according to the 1991 census.

The 1991 census recorded that 96% of the village population were ethnic Serbs (240/250), 3.20% were Yugoslavs (8/250) and 0.80% were of other/unknown ethnic origin (2/250).

Historical population 1857–2011
v

population	318	326	335	370	450	487	431	506	305	269	234	217	218	250	229	195
	1857	1869	1880	1890	1900	1910	1921	1931	1948	1953	1961	1971	1981	1991	2001	2011

Sources: Croatian Bureau of Statistics publications
