= Brebornica =

Coordinates: 45°18′04″N 15°36′14″E

Brebornica Бреборница (Serbian)
- Village
- Interactive map of Brebornica
- Country: Croatia
- County: Karlovac County
- Municipality: Krnjak

Area
  - Total: 2.1 sq mi (5.4 km^{2})

Population (2021)
  - Total: 36
  - Density: 17/sq mi (6.7/km^{2})
- Time zone: UTC+1 (CET)
  - Summer (DST): UTC+2 (CEST)

Brebornica (Serbian Cyrillic: Бреборница) is a village in Croatia. It is connected by the D1 highway.
