= Todorovska Slapnica =

- Village
- Location within Bosnia and Herzegovina
- Coordinates: 45.128889°N 15.913637°E
- Country: Bosnia and Herzegovina
- Entity: Federation of Bosnia and Herzegovina
- Canton: Una-Sana
- Municipality: Velika Kladuša

Area
  - Total: 3.97 sq mi (10.28 km^{2})

Population (2013)
  - Total: 1,091
  - Density: 274.9/sq mi (106.1/km^{2})
- Time zone: UTC+1 (CET)
  - Summer (DST): UTC+2 (CEST)

Todorovska Slapnica is a village in the municipality of Velika Kladuša, Bosnia and Herzegovina.

== Demographics ==
According to the 2013 census, its population was 1,091.

Ethnicity in 2013
Ethnicity	Number	Percentage
Bosniaks	985	90.3%
Croats	5	0.5%
other/undeclared	101	9.3%
Total	1,091	100%
