= Glinica, Velika Kladuša =

Glinica
- Village
- Location within Bosnia and Herzegovina
- Coordinates: 45.200440°N 15.942063°E
- Country: Bosnia and Herzegovina
- Entity: Federation of Bosnia and Herzegovina
- Canton: Una-Sana
- Municipality: Velika Kladuša

Area
  - Total: 1.58 sq mi (4.10 km^{2})

Population (2019)
  - Total: 240
  - Density: 150/sq mi (59/km^{2})
- Time zone: UTC+1 (CET)
  - Summer (DST): UTC+2 (CEST)

Glinica is a village in the municipality of Velika Kladuša, Bosnia and Herzegovina.

== Demographics ==
According to the 2013 census, its population was 159.

Ethnicity in 2018
Ethnicity	Number	Percentage
Bosniaks	119	74.8%
Croats	1	0.6%
other/undeclared	39	24.5%
Total	159	100%
