= Vukmanić =

- Location within Croatia
- Coordinates: 45°25′N 15°39′E
- Country: Croatia
- County: Karlovac
- City: Karlovac

Area
  - Total: 16.0 km^{2} (6.2 sq mi)

Population (2021)
  - Total: 194
  - Density: 12.1/km^{2} (31.4/sq mi)
- Time zone: UTC+1 (CET)
  - Summer (DST): UTC+2 (CEST)

Vukmanić is a village belonging to Karlovac in Croatia, population 207 (2011). It was the birthplace of Ivan Ribar who preceded Josip Broz Tito as post-World War II leader of Yugoslavia.

== Demographics ==
In 1890, the obćina of Vukmanić (court at Vukmanić), with an area of 132 square kilometres (51 mi^{2}), belonged to the kotar of Vojnić (Vojnić electoral district but Krnjak court) in the županija of Modruš-Rieka (Ogulin court and financial board). There were 1036 houses, with a population of 6853 (highest in Vojnić kotar): 3435 male and 3418 female. The majority were Croatian or Serbian speakers, but 24 spoke German, 18 spoke Hungarian, 5 spoke Slovene and 17 spoke other languages. The majority were Eastern Orthodox, but 3154 were Catholic. Its 22 villages were divided for taxation purposes into 8 porezne obćine, under the Slunj office.

== Infrastructure ==
In 1913, there were 6 gendarmeries in Vojnić kotar: Barilović, Krnjak, Krstinja, Perjasica, Vojnić and Vukmanić.
