= Krnjak =

Krnjak Крњак (Serbian)
- Municipality
- Coat of arms
- Interactive map of Krnjak
- Location in Croatia
- Coordinates: 45.336049°N 15.600684°E
- Country: Croatia
- County: Karlovac County

Area
  - Municipality: 111.8 km^{2} (43.2 sq mi)
  - Urban: 8.0 km^{2} (3.1 sq mi)

Population (2021)
  - Municipality: 1,332
  - Density: 11.91/km^{2} (30.86/sq mi)
  - Urban: 258
  - Urban density: 32/km^{2} (84/sq mi)
- Time zone: UTC+1 (CET)
  - Summer (DST): UTC+2 (CEST)
- Website: krnjak.hr

Krnjak (Serbian Cyrillic: Крњак) is a village and a municipality in Karlovac County, Croatia.

== History ==
On 13 April 2023 at 15:28 the ŽVOC Karlovac received a call about a wildfire in the area of Debela Kosa. 20 hectares (49 acres) burned by the time it was put out at 21:26 by DVD "Debela Kosa" Krnjak.

== Languages and names ==
On the territory of Krnjak municipality, along with Croatian which is official in the whole country, as a second official language has been introduced Serbian language and Serbian Cyrillic alphabet. As of 2023, most of the legal requirements for the fulfillment of bilingual standards have not been carried out. Official buildings and seals do have Cyrillic signage, but not street signs or traffic signs. Cyrillic is not used on any official documents, nor are there public legal and administrative employees proficient in the script. Preserving traditional Serbian place names and assigning street names to Serbian historical figures is legally mandated, but not carried out.

== Demographics ==
In 1890, the obćina of Krnjak (court at Krnjak), with an area of 101 square kilometres (39 mi^{2}), belonged to the kotar of Vojnić (Vojnić electoral district but Krnjak court) in the županija of Modruš-Rieka (Ogulin court and financial board). There were 825 houses, with a population of 4776: 2391 male and 2385 female. All were Croatian or Serbian speakers. The majority were Eastern Orthodox, but 27 were Catholic and 4 were Jewish. Its 27 villages were divided for taxation purposes into 8 porezne obćine, under the Slunj office.

In 1910, the court of Krnjak encompassed an area of 695 square kilometres (268 mi^{2}), with a population of 35,642. Krnjak had its own cadastral jurisdiction, but its business court was in Ogulin.

There are a total of 1,985 inhabitants in the municipality (census 2011), 68.6% which are Serbs and 29.2% which are Croats. By mother tongue there are 1,620 Croatian speakers, 201 Serbian speakers and 164 speakers of other languages. The municipality is part of Kordun.

== Settlements ==
The settlements in the municipality are:

- Bijeli Klanac (population 3) ▲
- Brebornica (population 36) ▼
- Budačka Rijeka (population 166) ▼
- Burić Selo (population 9) ▼
- Čatrnja (population 85) ▼
- Donji Budački (population 99) ▼
- Dugi Dol (population 74) ▼
- Dvorište (population 29) ▼
- Gornji Budački (population 9) ▼
- Gornji Skrad (population 44) ▼
- Grabovac Krnjački (population 58) ▼
- Grabovac Vojnićki (population 42) ▼
- Hrvatsko Žarište (population 23) ▼
- Jasnić Brdo (population 4) ▼
- Keserov Potok (population 4) ▼
- Krnjak (population 258) ▼
- Mala Crkvina (population 22) ▼
- Mlakovac (population 98) ▼
- Pavković Selo (population 54) ▲
- Perići (population 13) ▼
- Podgorje Krnjačko (population 47) ▼
- Poljana Vojnićka (population 14) ▼
- Ponorac (population 16) ▼
- Rastovac Budački (population 12) ▼
- Suhodol Budački (population 4) ▼
- Trupinjak (population 0) ▼
- Velika Crkvina (population 25) ▼
- Vojnović Brdo (population 5) ▼
- Zagorje (population 39) ▼
- Zimić (population 40) ▼

Hrvatsko Žarište, once called Partizansko Žarište, was famous for its elementary school, that was founded by family Vidić.

== Infrastructure ==
In 1913, there were 6 gendarmeries in Vojnić kotar: Barilović, Krnjak, Krstinja, Perjasica, Vojnić and Vukmanić.

== Notable people ==
- Vladimir Matijević
