= Krstinja =

Coordinates: 45°15′N 15°44′E

Krstinja Крстиња (Serbian)
- Village
- Interactive map of Krstinja
- Country: Croatia
- County: Karlovac County
- Municipality: Vojnić

Area
  - Total: 3.6 km^{2} (1.4 sq mi)

Population (2021)
  - Total: 35
  - Density: 9.7/km^{2} (25/sq mi)
- Time zone: UTC+1 (CET)
  - Summer (DST): UTC+2 (CEST)

Krstinja (Serbian Cyrillic: Крстиња) is a village in Croatia. It is connected by the D216 highway.

== Demographics ==
In 1890, the obćina of Krstinja (court at Krstinja), with an area of 104 square kilometres (40 mi^{2}), belonged to the kotar of Vojnić (Vojnić electoral district but Krnjak court) in the županija of Modruš-Rieka (Ogulin court and financial board). There were 903 houses, with a population of 5602: 2391 male and 2385 female. All were Croatian or Serbian speakers. The majority were Eastern Orthodox, but 73 were Catholic. Its 23 villages were divided for taxation purposes into 7 porezne obćine, under the Slunj office.

== Infrastructure ==
In 1913, there were 6 gendarmeries in Vojnić kotar: Barilović, Krnjak, Krstinja, Perjasica, Vojnić and Vukmanić.
