= Žabljak, Usora =

Žabljak
- Village
- Location within Bosnia and Herzegovina
- Coordinates: 44.6646512°N 17.9890392°E
- Country: Bosnia and Herzegovina
- Entity: Federation of Bosnia and Herzegovina
- Canton: Zenica-Doboj
- Municipality: Usora

Area
  - Total: 1.41 sq mi (3.66 km^{2})

Population (2013)
  - Total: 659
  - Density: 466/sq mi (180/km^{2})
- Time zone: UTC+1 (CET)
  - Summer (DST): UTC+2 (CEST)

Žabljak is a village in the municipality of Usora, Bosnia and Herzegovina.

== Demographics ==
According to the 2013 census, its population was 659.

Ethnicity in 2013
Ethnicity	Number	Percentage
Croats	522	79.2%
Bosniaks	115	17.5%
Serbs	12	1.8%
other/undeclared	10	1.5%
Total	659	100%
