= Lučice (Havlíčkův Brod District) =

- Municipality
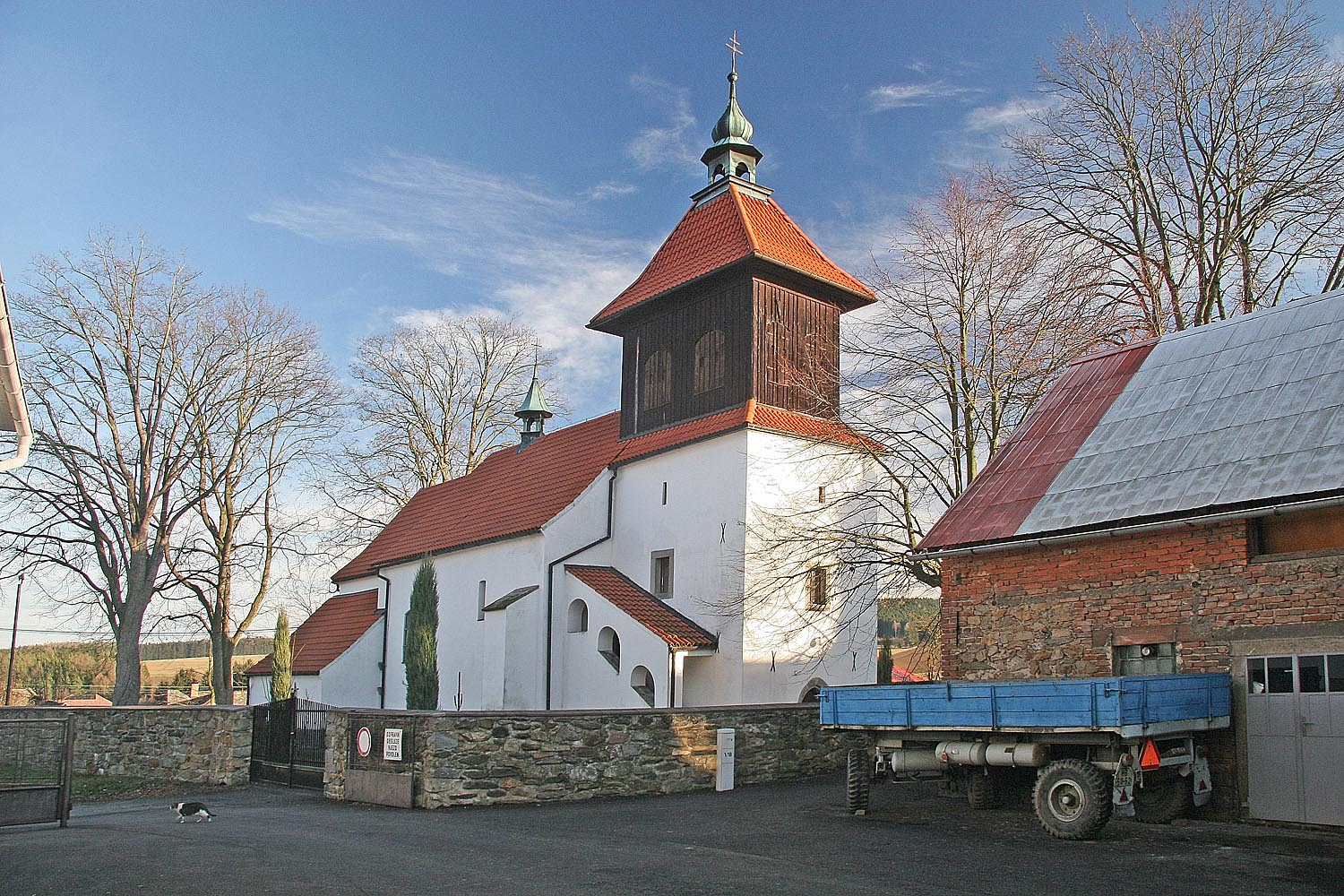
- Church of Saint Margaret the Virgin

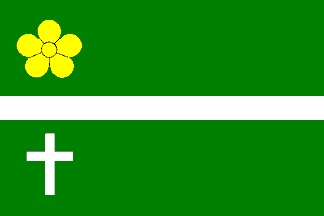
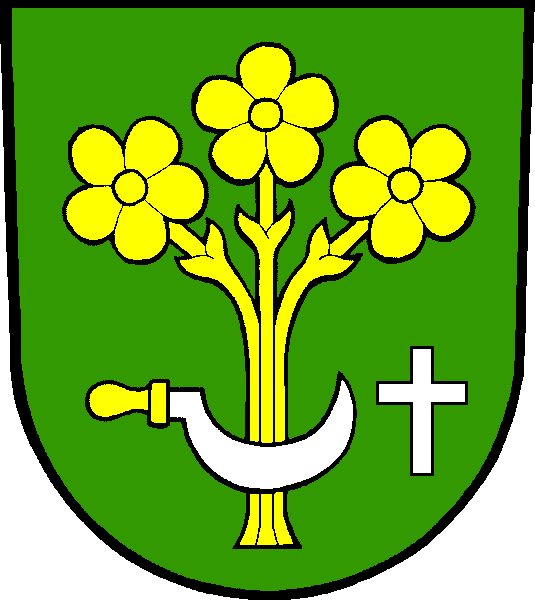
- Flag Coat of arms

- Location in the Czech Republic
- Coordinates: 49°39′44″N 15°29′48″E
- Country: Czech Republic
- Region: Vysočina
- District: Havlíčkův Brod
- First mentioned: 1352

Area
  - Total: 8.50 km^{2} (3.28 sq mi)
- Elevation: 454 m (1,490 ft)

Population (2026-01-01)
  - Total: 651
  - Density: 76.6/km^{2} (198/sq mi)
- Time zone: UTC+1 (CET)
  - Summer (DST): UTC+2 (CEST)
- Postal code: 582 35
- Website: www.lucice.cz

Lučice is a municipality and village in Havlíčkův Brod District in the Vysočina Region of the Czech Republic. It has about 700 inhabitants.

Lučice lies approximately 9 kilometres (6 mi) north-west of Havlíčkův Brod, 31 km (19 mi) north of Jihlava, and 91 km (57 mi) south-east of Prague.

== Demographics ==
Historical population
| Year | Pop. | ±% |
|---|---|---|
| 1869 | 630 | — |
| 1880 | 674 | +7.0% |
| 1890 | 632 | −6.2% |
| 1900 | 654 | +3.5% |
| 1910 | 748 | +14.4% |
| 1921 | 752 | +0.5% |
| 1930 | 803 | +6.8% |
| 1950 | 712 | −11.3% |
| 1961 | 716 | +0.6% |
| 1970 | 654 | −8.7% |
| 1980 | 657 | +0.5% |
| 1991 | 569 | −13.4% |
| 2001 | 569 | +0.0% |
| 2011 | 632 | +11.1% |
| 2021 | 612 | −3.2% |
Source: Censuses
