= Glinice, Croatia =

Settlement in Karlovac County, Croatia

Glinice
- Settlement
- Interactive map of Glinice
- Location of Glinice in Croatia
- Coordinates: 45°11′56″N 15°39′32″E
- Country: Croatia
- County: Karlovac County
- Municipality: Cetingrad

Area
  - Total: 6.6 km^{2} (2.5 sq mi)

Population (2021)
  - Total: 12
  - Density: 1.8/km^{2} (4.7/sq mi)
- Time zone: UTC+1 (CET)
  - Summer (DST): UTC+2 (CEST)
- Postal code: 47240 Slunj
- Area code: +385 (0)47

Glinice is a settlement in the Municipality of Cetingrad in Croatia. In 2021, its population was 12.

== Demographics ==
Glinice: Population trends 1857–2021
v

population	156	279	324	344	346	426	399	447	381	354	360	267	191	123	67	31	12
	1857	1869	1880	1890	1900	1910	1921	1931	1948	1953	1961	1971	1981	1991	2001	2011	2021

Sources: Croatian Bureau of Statistics publications
