= Johovo =

Coordinates: 45°16′19″N 15°39′32″E

Johovo Јохово (Serbian)
- Village
- Interactive map of Johovo
- Country: Croatia
- County: Karlovac County
- Municipality: Vojnić

Area
  - Total: 0.62 sq mi (1.6 km^{2})

Population (2021)
  - Total: 16
  - Density: 26/sq mi (10/km^{2})
- Time zone: UTC+1 (CET)
  - Summer (DST): UTC+2 (CEST)

Johovo (Serbian Cyrillic: Јохово) is a village in Croatia.
