= Begovo Brdo, Serbia =

Coordinates: 43.583°N 21.327°E

Begovo Brdo
- Village
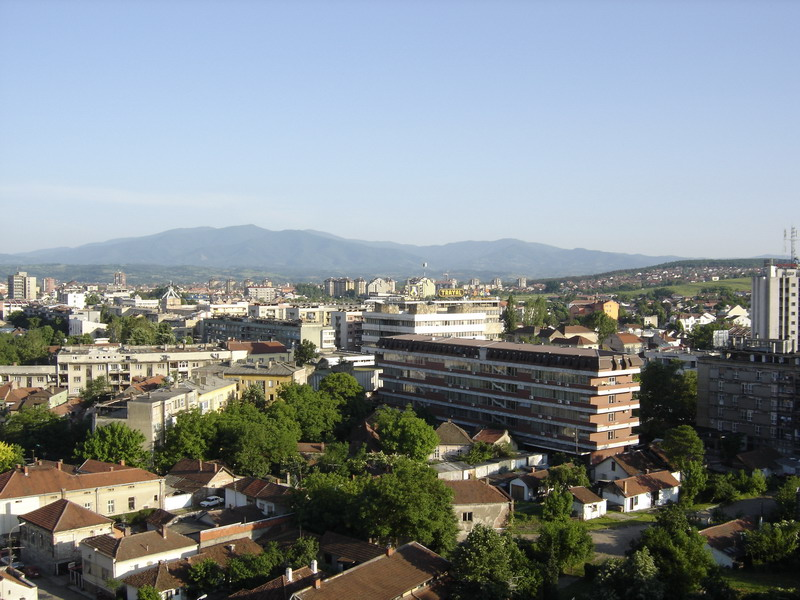
- Interactive map of Begovo Brdo
- Country: Serbia

Population (2022)
  - Total: 541
- Time zone: UTC+1 (CET)
  - Summer (DST): UTC+2 (CEST)

Begovo Brdo (Serbian Cyrillic: Бегово Брдо) is a village in Kruševac, Rasina district, Serbia. As of 2022, the population is 541.
