= Klokoč, Croatia =

Klokoč Клокоч (Serbian)
- Village
- Location of Klokoč in Croatia
- Coordinates: 45°12′41″N 15°41′33″E
- Country: Croatia
- County: Karlovac County
- Municipality: Vojnić

Area
  - Total: 9.3 km^{2} (3.6 sq mi)
- Elevation: 177 m (581 ft)

Population (2021)
  - Total: 46
  - Density: 4.9/km^{2} (13/sq mi)
- Time zone: UTC+1 (CET)
  - Summer (DST): UTC+2 (CEST)
- Postal code: 47220 Vojnić
- Area code: (+385) 47

Klokoč (Serbian Cyrillic: Клокоч) is a village in central Croatia, in the municipality of Vojnić, Karlovac County.

== Demographics ==
According to the 2011 census, the village of Klokoč has 64 inhabitants. This represents 19.28% of its pre-war population according to the 1991 census.

The 1991 census recorded that 97.89% of the village population were ethnic Serbs (325/332), 0.30% were Croat (1/332), 0.30% were Slovenes (1/332) and 1.51% were of other/unknown ethnic origin (5/332).

Historical population 1857-2011
v

population	537	557	559	582	604	699	628	707	506	517	479	405	357	332	69	64
	1857	1869	1880	1890	1900	1910	1921	1931	1948	1953	1961	1971	1981	1991	2001	2011

Sources: Croatian Bureau of Statistics publications
