= Žabljak, Croatia =

Coordinates: 45°22′13″N 15°29′31″E

Žabljak
- Village
- Interactive map of Žabljak
- Country: Croatia
- County: Karlovac County
- Municipality: Barilović

Population (2011)
  - Total: 58
- Time zone: UTC+1 (CET)
  - Summer (DST): UTC+2 (CEST)

Žabljak is a village in Croatia, located 5.4 km (3.4 mi) from Barilović. It is near the Skrad castle.
