= Dunjak =

Coordinates: 45°14′N 15°40′E

Dunjak Дуњак (Serbian)
- Village
- Interactive map of Dunjak
- Country: Croatia
- County: Karlovac County
- Municipality: Vojnić

Area
  - Total: 2.2 sq mi (5.6 km^{2})

Population (2021)
  - Total: 18
  - Density: 8.3/sq mi (3.2/km^{2})
- Time zone: UTC+1 (CET)
  - Summer (DST): UTC+2 (CEST)

Dunjak (Serbian Cyrillic: Дуњак) is a village in Croatia.
