= Zimić =

Coordinates: 45°22′26″N 15°38′42″E

Zimić Зимић (Serbian)
- Village
- Interactive map of Zimić
- Country: Croatia
- County: Karlovac County

Area
  - Total: 4.7 sq mi (12.1 km^{2})

Population (2021)
  - Total: 40
  - Density: 8.6/sq mi (3.3/km^{2})
- Time zone: UTC+1 (CET)
  - Summer (DST): UTC+2 (CEST)

Zimić (Serbian Cyrillic: Зимић) is a village in Croatia.
