= Slapnica, Croatia =

Coordinates: 45°46′N 15°37′E

- Settlement
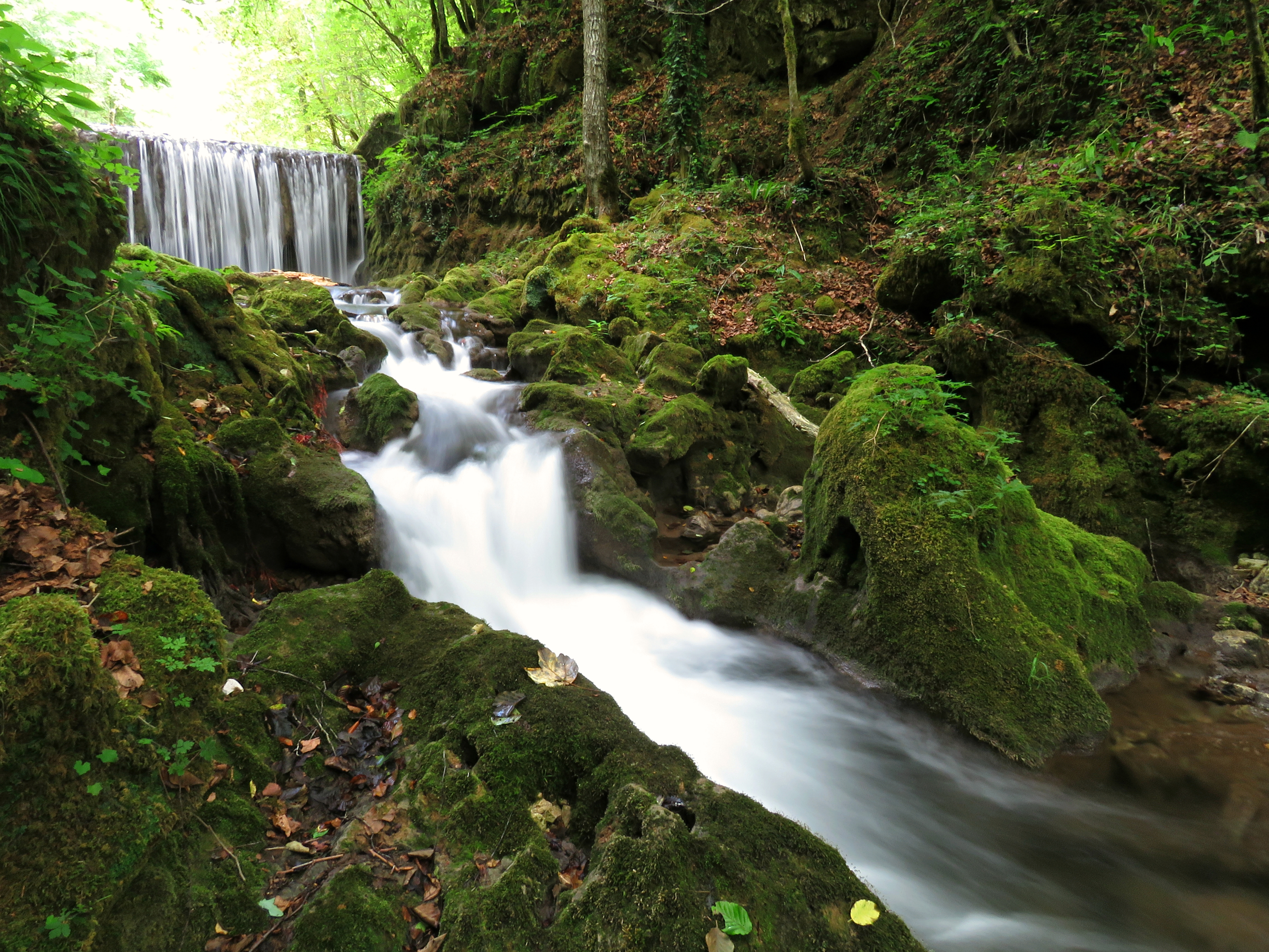
- Žumberak / Slapnica

- Location within Croatia
- Country: Croatia
- County: Zagreb
- City: Samobor

Population (2011)
  - Total: 16
- Time zone: UTC+1 (CET)
  - Summer (DST): UTC+2 (CEST)

Slapnica, Croatia is a settlement (naselje) in the Samobor administrative territory of Zagreb County, Croatia. As of 2011 it had a population of 16 people.
