= Carevo Selo, Croatia =

Settlement in Karlovac County, Croatia

Carevo Selo
- Settlement
- Interactive map of Carevo Selo
- Location of Carevo Selo in Croatia
- Coordinates: 45°23′24″N 15°32′10″E
- Country: Croatia
- County: Karlovac County
- Municipality: Barilović

Area
  - Total: 3.0 km^{2} (1.2 sq mi)

Population (2021)
  - Total: 34
  - Density: 11/km^{2} (29/sq mi)
- Time zone: UTC+1 (CET)
  - Summer (DST): UTC+2 (CEST)
- Postal code: 47250 Duga Resa
- Area code: +385 (0)47

Carevo Selo is a settlement in the Municipality of Barilović in Croatia. In 2021, its population was 34.
