= Lučica, Croatia =

Lučica
- Village
- Location within Croatia
- Coordinates: 45°20′44″N 15°29′00″E
- Country: Croatia
- County: Karlovac

Area
  - Total: 2.0 km^{2} (0.77 sq mi)

Population (2021)
  - Total: 32
  - Density: 16/km^{2} (41/sq mi)
- Time zone: UTC+1 (CET)
  - Summer (DST): UTC+2 (CEST)

Lučica is a village in Karlovac County in the municipality of Barilović, central Croatia. It is near the Skrad castle.
