= Begovo Brdo, Croatia =

Settlement in Karlovac County, Croatia

Begovo Brdo
- Settlement
- Interactive map of Begovo Brdo
- Location of Begovo Brdo in Croatia
- Coordinates: 45°10′41″N 15°41′42″E
- Country: Croatia
- County: Karlovac County
- Municipality: Cetingrad

Area
  - Total: 2.9 km^{2} (1.1 sq mi)

Population (2021)
  - Total: 0
  - Density: 0.0/km^{2} (0.0/sq mi)
- Time zone: UTC+1 (CET)
  - Summer (DST): UTC+2 (CEST)
- Postal code: 47240 Slunj
- Area code: +385 (0)47

Begovo Brdo is a settlement in the Municipality of Cetingrad in Croatia. In 2021, its population was 0.

== Demographics ==
Begovo Brdo: Population trends 1857–2021
v

population				185	212	235	157	213	95	107	94	67			7	4
	1857	1869	1880	1890	1900	1910	1921	1931	1948	1953	1961	1971	1981	1991	2001	2011	2021

Sources: Croatian Bureau of Statistics publications
