= Maurovići, Bosnia and Herzegovina =

Maurovići
- Village
- Location within Bosnia and Herzegovina
- Coordinates: 44.0325829°N 18.0746234°E
- Country: Bosnia and Herzegovina
- Entity: Federation of Bosnia and Herzegovina
- Canton: Zenica-Doboj
- Municipality: Visoko

Area
  - Total: 1.20 sq mi (3.10 km^{2})

Population (2013)
  - Total: 533
  - Density: 445/sq mi (172/km^{2})
- Time zone: UTC+1 (CET)
  - Summer (DST): UTC+2 (CEST)

Maurovići is a village in the municipality of Visoko, Bosnia and Herzegovina.

== Demographics ==
According to the 2013 census, its population was 533.

Ethnicity in 2013
Ethnicity	Number	Percentage
Bosniaks	515	96.6%
Serbs	11	2.1%
other/undeclared	7	1.3%
Total	533	100%
