= Radio Bihać =

Bosnian radio station

Bihać; Bosnia and Herzegovina
- Broadcast area: Una-Sana Canton
- Frequencies: Bihać 92.3 MHz; Bihać 94.7 MHz
- Branding: Public

Programming
- Language: Bosnian language
- Format: Local news, talk and music

Ownership
- Owner: Javno preduzeće "Radio- televizija Bihać"
- Sister stations: 037 Televizija (TV; 2010 - 2013)

History
- First air date: March 28, 1966

Technical information
- Transmitter coordinates: 44°49′N 15°52′E
- Repeaters: Bihać/Maskara 1 Bihać/Brekovica

Links
- Webcast: On website
- Website: www.rtvbihac.ba www.radiobihac.com

Radio Bihać is a Bosnian local public radio station, broadcasting from Bihać, Bosnia and Herzegovina.

Radio Bihać was launched on 28 March 1966 by the municipal council of Bihać. In Yugoslavia and in SR Bosnia and Herzegovina, it was part of local/municipal Radio Sarajevo network affiliate.

This radio station broadcasts a variety of programs such as music, sport, local news and talk shows. Program is mainly produced in Bosnian language.

For the oldest radio station in Una-Sana Canton and in the town of Bihać, estimated number of potential listeners of Radio Bihać is around 53,399.

Due to the favorable geographical position in Bosanska Krajina area, this radiostation is also available in municipalities: Cazin, Bužim, Bosanska Krupa, Velika Kladuša, Prijedor and in a part of the Lika-Senj County in neighboring Croatia. Radio Bihać is also available via IPTV platform Moja TV on channel 187.

== Frequencies ==
The program is currently broadcast on 2 frequencies:

- Bihać 92.3 MHz
- Bihać 94.7 MHz

== See also ==
- List of radio stations in Bosnia and Herzegovina
