= Gornje Gnojnice =

- Village
- Location within Bosnia and Herzegovina
- Coordinates: 43.3262885°N 17.883443°E
- Country: Bosnia and Herzegovina
- Entity: Federation of Bosnia and Herzegovina
- Canton: Herzegovina-Neretva
- Municipality: City of Mostar

Area
  - Total: 10.24 sq mi (26.53 km^{2})

Population (2013)
  - Total: 105
  - Density: 10.3/sq mi (3.96/km^{2})
- Time zone: UTC+1 (CET)
  - Summer (DST): UTC+2 (CEST)

Gornje Gnojnice is a village in the City of Mostar, Bosnia and Herzegovina.

== Demographics ==
According to the 2013 census, its population was 105, all Bosniaks.
