= Maljevac =

- Village
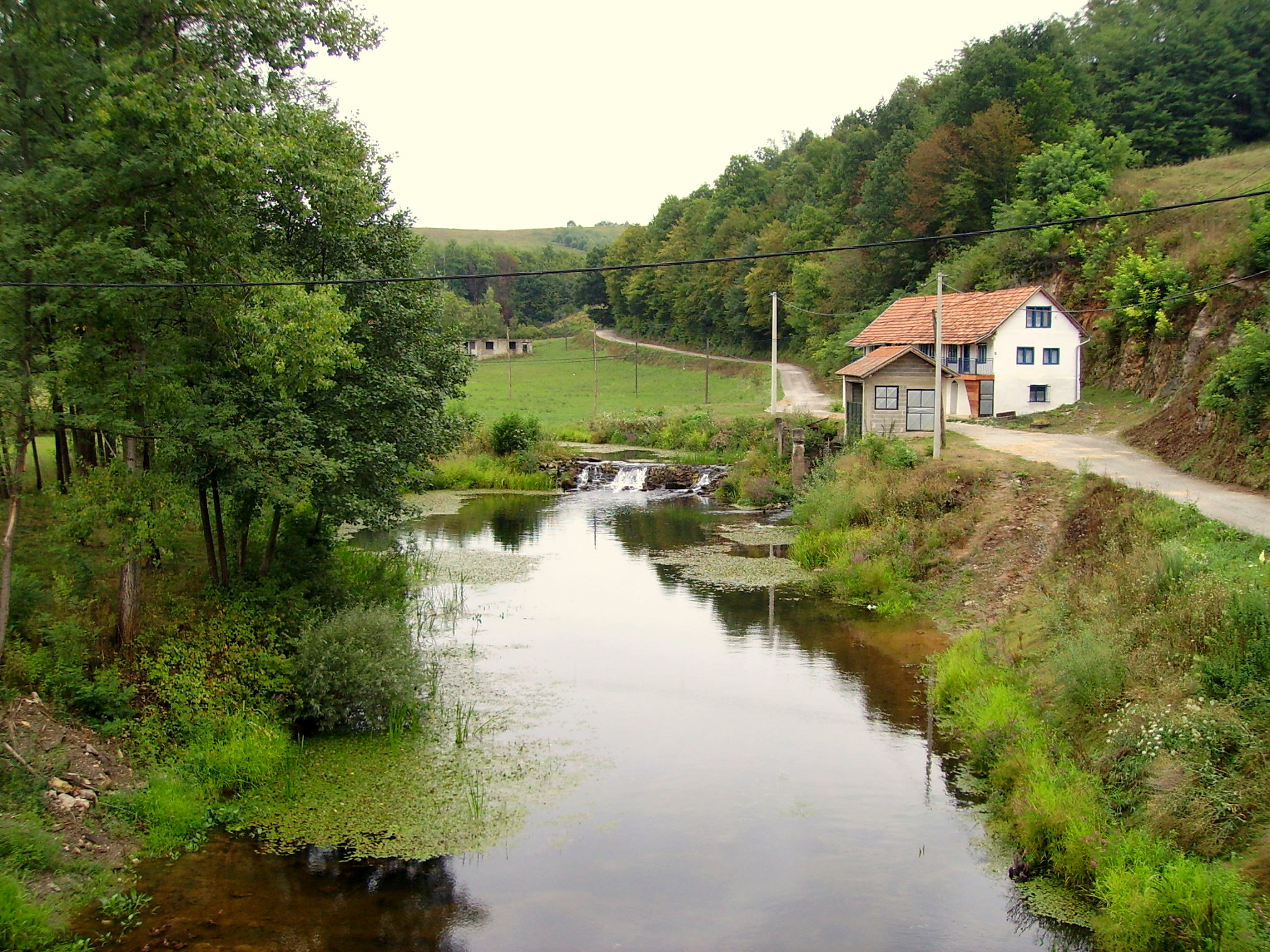
- Interactive map of Maljevac
- Location within Croatia
- Coordinates: 45°12′04″N 15°46′44″E
- Country: Croatia
- County: Karlovac County

Area
  - Total: 2.0 sq mi (5.1 km^{2})

Population (2021)
  - Total: 83
  - Density: 42/sq mi (16/km^{2})
- Time zone: UTC+1 (CET)
  - Summer (DST): UTC+2 (CEST)

Maljevac is a village in Croatia, population 115 (2011).

Maljevac lies on the Glina River. It is connected by the D216 highway. It houses a mosque attended to by the local Bosnian Muslim population.
