= Vojnić =

Vojnić Војнић (Serbian)
- Municipality
- Općina Vojnić; Општина Војнић; Municipality of Vojnić
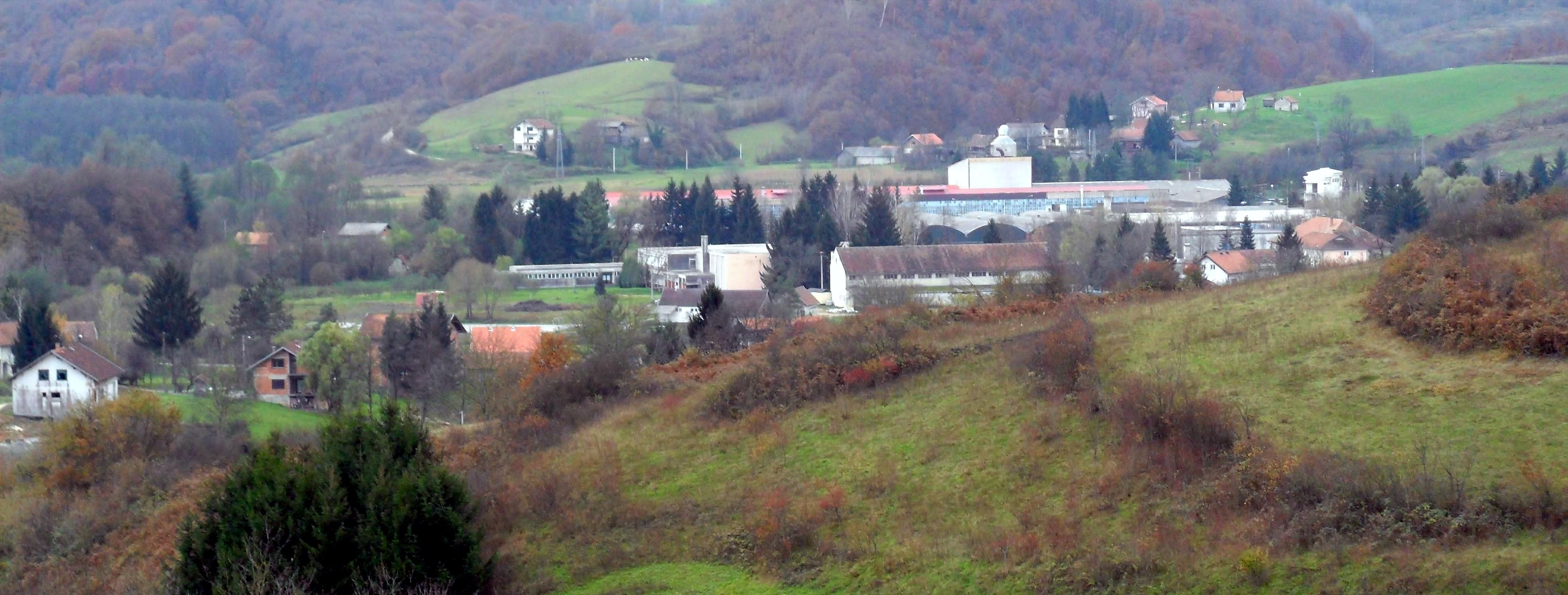

- Coat of arms
- Interactive map of Vojnić
- Location within Croatia
- Coordinates: 45°25′N 15°50′E
- Country: Croatia
- Region: Central Croatia
- County: Karlovac County

Government
  - Mayor: Nebojša Andrić

Area
  - Municipality: 238.9 km^{2} (92.2 sq mi)
  - Urban: 3.5 km^{2} (1.4 sq mi)

Population (2021)
  - Municipality: 3,602
  - Density: 15.08/km^{2} (39.05/sq mi)
  - Urban: 1,099
  - Urban density: 310/km^{2} (810/sq mi)
- Time zone: UTC+1 (CET)
  - Summer (DST): UTC+2 (CEST)
- Area code: 047
- Website: vojnic.hr

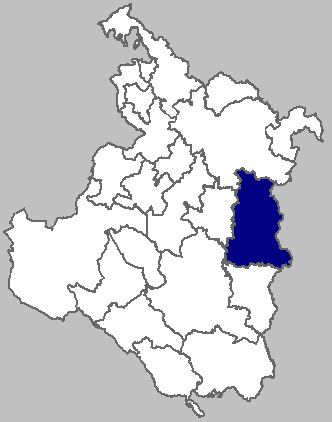
Image of Vojnić municipality within Karlovac County

Vojnić (Serbian Cyrillic: Војнић) is a municipality in Karlovac County, Croatia. There are 4,764 inhabitants. The municipality is part of Kordun. Vojnić is underdeveloped municipality which is statistically classified as the First Category Area of Special State Concern by the Government of Croatia.

== Languages and names ==
On the territory of Vojnić municipality, along with Croatian which is official in the whole country, as a second official language has been introduced Serbian language and Serbian Cyrillic alphabet. As of 2023, most of the legal requirements for the fulfillment of bilingual standards have not been carried out. Official buildings do have Cyrillic signage, as do seals, but not street signs or traffic signs. Cyrillic is not used on any official documents, nor are there public legal and administrative employees proficient in the script. Preserving traditional minority place names and assigning street names to minority historical figures is legally mandated, but while this is carried out for Bosniaks, it is not carried out for Serbs.

== Demographics ==
In 1890, the obćina of Vojnić, with an area of 137 square kilometres (53 mi^{2}), belonged to the kotar of Vojnić (Vojnić electoral district but Krnjak court) in the županija of Modruš-Rieka (Ogulin court and financial board). There were 993 houses, with a population of 5548: 2762 male and 2786 female. The majority were Croatian or Serbian speakers, but 18 spoke Slovene, 16 German, 1 Czech and 2 spoke other languages. The majority were Eastern Orthodox, but 106 were Catholic, 6 were Protestant, 6 were Jewish and 1 was Eastern Catholic. Its 24 villages were divided for taxation purposes into 7 porezne obćine, under the Slunj office. In the 695 square kilometres (268 mi^{2}) Vojnić kotar, there were a total of 5370 houses, with a population of 32,944. Its 157 villages hamlets were divided into 42 porezne obćine. The kotar had no statistical markets. Vojnić kotar was divided into 6 općine. Besides itself: Barilović, Krnjak, Krstinja, Perjasica, Vukmanić.

In 1991 the municipality of Vojnić had a population of 8,236. 7,366 (89.43%) were Serbs, 436 (5.29%) were Muslims, 116 (1.40%) were Croats and 318 (3.86%) were others.

According to the 2011 census, the municipality consists of 46 settlements:

- Brdo Utinjsko, population 73
- Bukovica Utinjska, population 80
- Donja Brusovača, population 122
- Dunjak, population 39
- Džaperovac, population 12
- Gačeša Selo, population 46
- Gejkovac, population 183
- Gornja Brusovača, population 33
- Jagrovac, population 44
- Johovo, population 36
- Jurga, population 89
- Kartalije, population 43
- Kestenovac, population 10
- Klokoč, population 64
- Klupica, population 11
- Ključar, population 86
- Knežević Kosa, population 119
- Kokirevo, population 43
- Kolarić, population 195
- Krivaja Vojnićka, population 21
- Krstinja, population 82
- Kupljensko, population 317
- Kusaja, population 45
- Lipovac Krstinjski, population 7
- Lisine, population 11
- Loskunja, population 58
- Malešević Selo, population 44
- Mandić Selo, population 65
- Međeđak Utinjski, population 62
- Miholjsko, population 123
- Mracelj, population 116
- Mračaj Krstinjski, population 7
- Petrova Poljana, population 17
- Podsedlo, population 76
- Prisjeka, population 24
- Radmanovac, population 33
- Radonja, population 103
- Rajić Brdo, population 26
- Selakova Poljana, population 0
- Svinica Krstinjska, population 253
- Široka Rijeka, population 161
- Štakorovica, population 23
- Utinja Vrelo, population 18
- Vojišnica, population 404
- Vojnić, population 1 221
- Živković Kosa, population 119

== History ==
Until 1918, Vojnić (named VOINIC in 1850) was part of the Austrian monarchy (Kingdom of Croatia-Slavonia, after the compromise of 1867), in the Croatian Military Frontier. It was administered by the SZLUINER Grenz-Infanterie-Regiment N°IV before 1881. Vojnić became a district capital in the Modruš-Rijeka County in the Kingdom.

== Culture ==
- Local branch of SKD Prosvjeta Vojnić with a very active folk dance section

== Sights and events ==
- Monument to the uprising of the people of Kordun and Banija
- Zelena noć Petrove gore - one-day folklore event hosted by the local football club, Petrova Gora, and the local branch of SKD Prosvjeta Vojnić. The event brings together amateur groups nurturing traditional folk dancing and singing from different parts of Croatia, Serbia and Bosnia and Herzegovina.

== Infrastructure ==
In 1913, there were 6 gendarmeries in Vojnić kotar: Barilović, Krnjak, Krstinja, Perjasica, Vojnić and Vukmanić.

== Notable people ==
- Branko Dobrosavljević
- Miloš Hrstić
- Nebojša Ivančević
