= Velika Kladuša =

Velika Kladuša Велика Кладуша
- Town and municipality
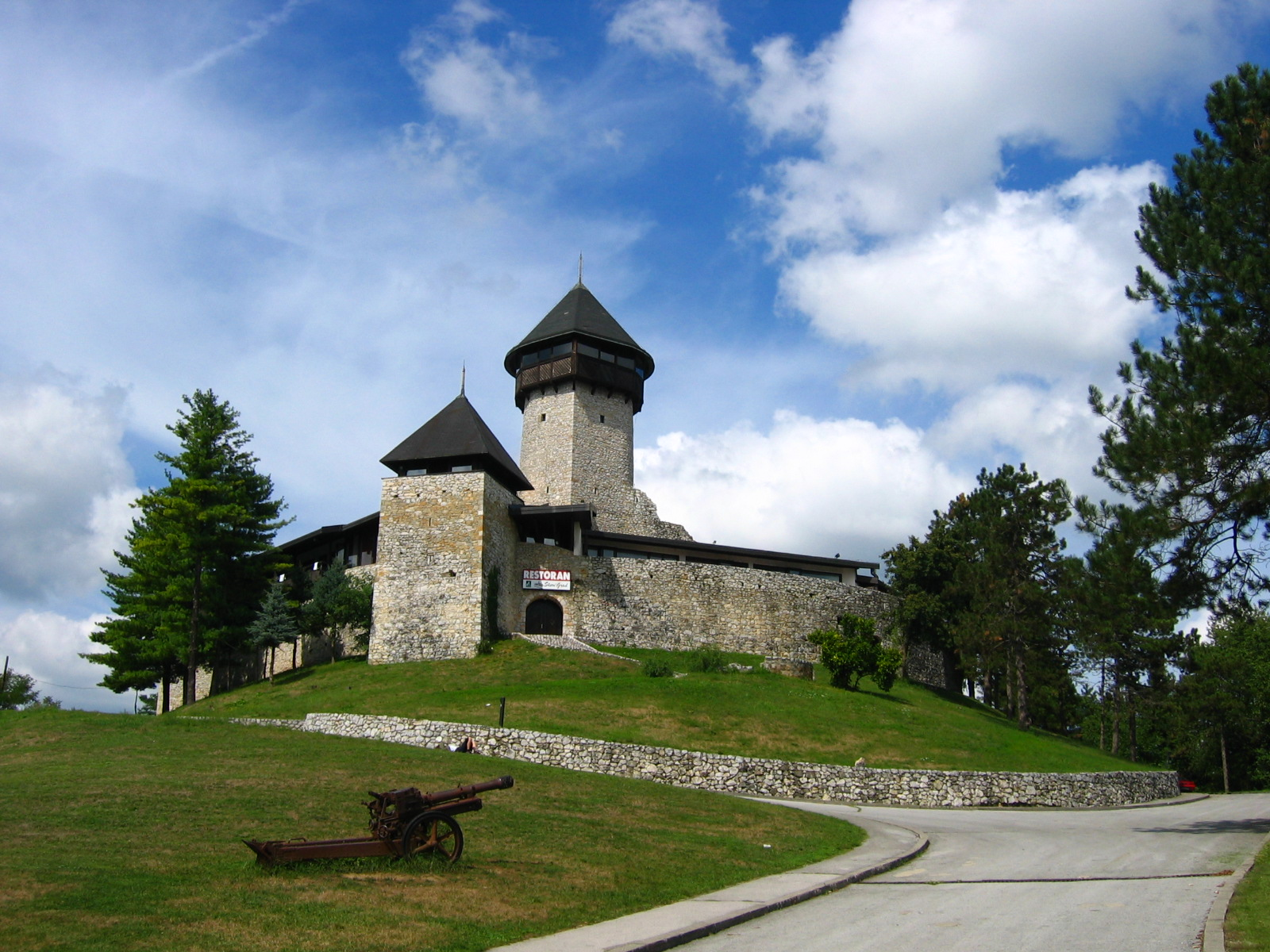
- Velika Kladuša's castle in 2008

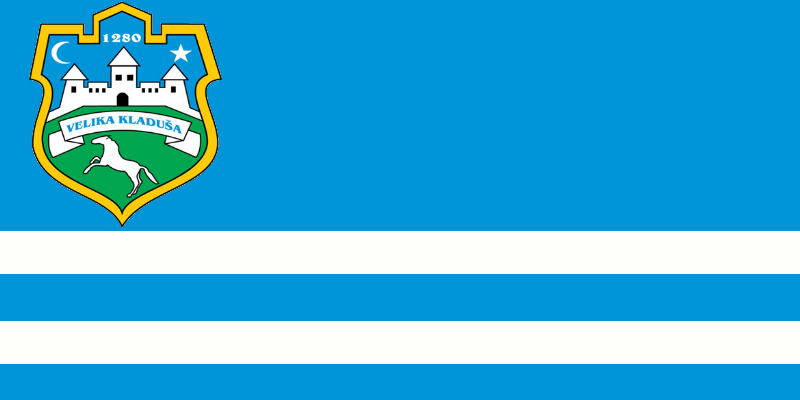
- Flag Seal
- Interactive map of Velika Kladuša
- Location within Bosnia and Herzegovina
- Coordinates: 45°11′N 15°48′E
- Country: Bosnia and Herzegovina
- Entity: Federation of Bosnia and Herzegovina
- Canton: Una-Sana Canton
- Geographical region: Bosanska Krajina

Government
  - Municipal mayor: Boris Horvat (Ind.)

Area
  - Town and municipality: 331 km^{2} (128 sq mi)

Population (2013 census)
  - Urban: 4,520
  - Municipality: 40,419
- Time zone: UTC+1 (CET)
  - Summer (DST): UTC+2 (CEST)
- ZIP code: 77230
- Area code: +387 37
- Website: www.velikakladusa.gov.ba

Velika Kladuša (Serbian Cyrillic: Велика Кладуша, pronounced [ʋêlikaː klǎduʃa]; lit. "Great Kladuša") is a town in the Una-Sana Canton, Bosnia and Herzegovina.

== Geography ==
Velika Kladuša is situated in the far northwest of Bosnia, located on the border with Croatia. The river Grabarska passes eastwards through the city, flowing into the Kladušnica, which in turn flows north to its confluence with the Glina.

As of 2013, it has a population of 40,419 inhabitants expanding over 331,73 km². This makes Velika Kladuša one of the most densely populated areas in Bosnia and Herzegovina.

The magistral road M-4.2 connects it to Cazin and Ostrožac na Uni in the south, while the M-4.3 connects it to Bužim and Otoka in the southeast. To the northwest, across the border the M-4.2 connects to the D216 road in Maljevac, towards Vojnić.

== History ==
Velika Kladuša was first mentioned by name on October 30, 1280 by the name Cladosa under the rule of King Ladislaus IV of Hungary. During the era in which the Byzantine Empire ruled over the town, it is assumed that the population of the town started to slowly grow. Towards the end of the 13th century up to 1464, Velika Kladuša was controlled by the Croatian noble families of Babonić, Frankopan, Šubić and Tuz de Lak.

Around 1464 at the time of the conquest of the Kingdom of Bosnia, the Ottoman Empire was expanding towards this region. The town was raided in 1558, then captured in 1633 by the Ottoman Empire. After the Ottoman conquest, Islamization of the hitherto Christian region began and much of the local population converted to Islam. Velika Kladuša would later become the center of Ottoman expansion into neighboring Croatia as well as the rest of Europe. At the start of the occupation of Bosnia and Herzegovina by the Austro-Hungarian Empire in 1878, Velika Kladuša along with others in the region, put up the biggest resistance in the region. Nevertheless, it developed with the opening of schools, the introduction of land register books, and the construction of a mosque and a Catholic church.

=== World War II and Socialist Yugoslavia ===
During World War II, the region of Velika Kladuša fought on the side of the Yugoslav Partisans. At one point, the town switched alliances and allowed the Nazis to occupy it, but this was planned out with the Partisans, because they then surprised the Nazis by jointly attacking them. The people in this region were always strong supporters of Yugoslav President Josip Broz Tito and communism. In late July 1941, Velika Kladuša and its surroundings became the site of a massacre of around 4,000 Serb civilians by the Croatian Ustaše, under the Ičungar Hill where anti-tank trenches were situated.

In May 1950, Velika Kladuša was the scene of a major peasant revolt when the Cazin uprising, an armed anti-state rebellion, occurred. The event mostly affected neighboring Cazin, as well as Slunj, which were all part of Communist Yugoslavia at the time. The peasants revolted against the forced collectivization and collective farms by the Yugoslav government. Following a drought in 1949, the peasants of Yugoslavia were unable to meet the quotas set by their government (which were deemed unrealistic by the peasants) and were punished. The revolt that followed the drought resulted in the killings and persecution of those who organized the uprising, but also many innocent civilians. It was the only peasant rebellion in the history of Cold War Europe.

==== Agrokomerc ====
Starting in 1967, the town became the headquarters of Agrokomerc, one of the biggest food companies in the Socialist Federal Republic of Yugoslavia. The company started as a single food producing farm and grew to an estimated 13,000 employees at its peak of production in August of 1987. Agrokomerc turned Velika Kladuša and the surrounding areas into one of the richest municipalities.

=== Yugoslav Wars and the post-war years ===
During the war in Yugoslavia, Agrokomerc still continued to operate as it produced all types of food bound for Zagreb, Belgrade and other places. During the Bosnian War (1992–1995), the town was the capital of the self-declared Autonomous Province of Western Bosnia. The seat of the government was at the Stari Grad Castle, which had defense forces guarding it throughout the day and night. The city itself did not suffer much damage as it was mostly spared of major fighting. Following the end of the Bosnian War, the town was the home of a Czech helicopter unit and Canadian Forces NATO camp supporting the IFOR and SFOR peacemaking missions from 1995 to 2004.

== Demographics ==
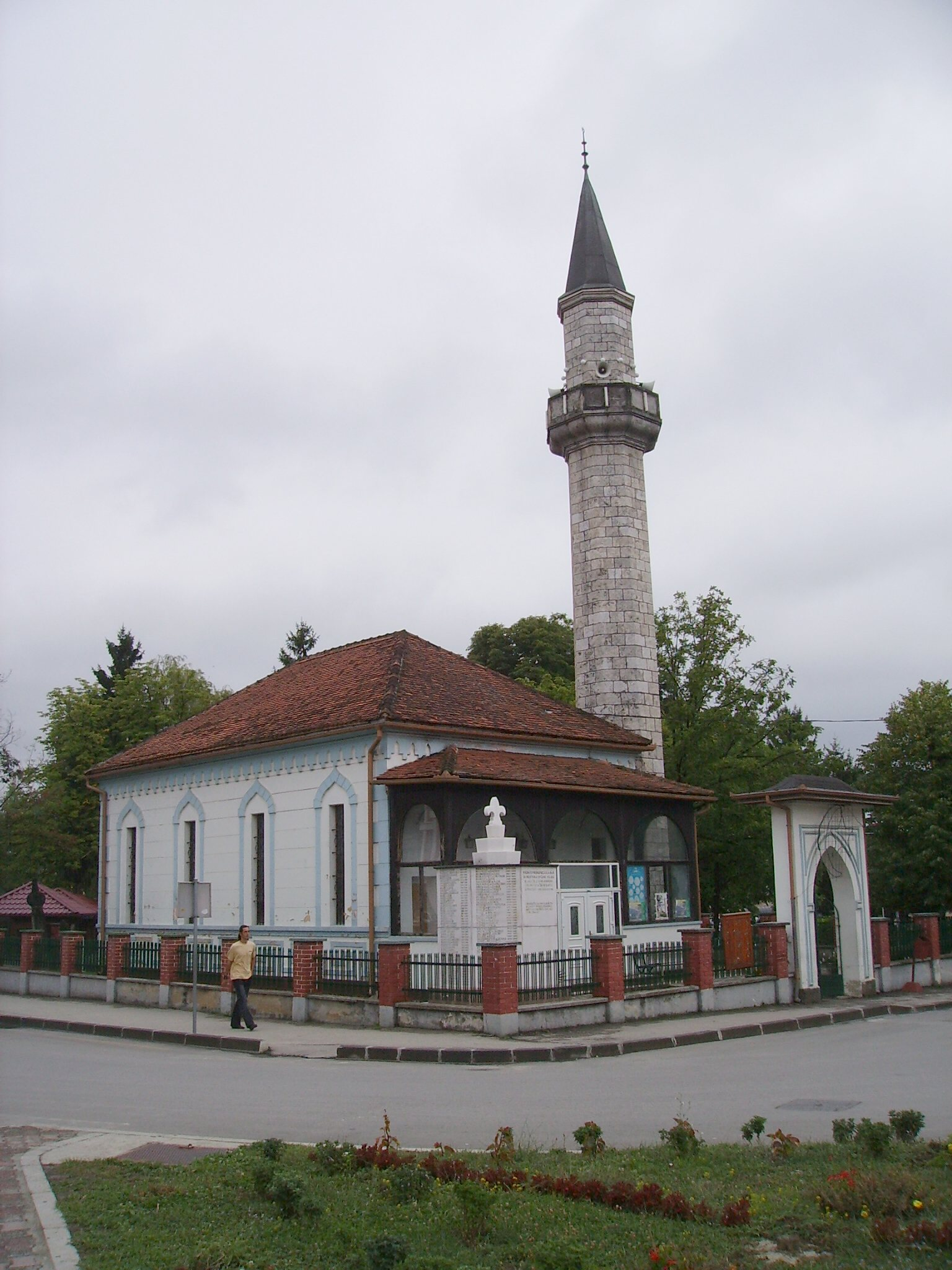
The main town mosque in Velika Kladuša

=== 2013 ===
According to the 2013 census the municipality of Velika Kladuša had 40,419 residents, including:

- 32,561 Bosniaks (80.56%)
- 4,781 Bosnians (11.83%)
- 1,366 Muslims (3.38%)
- 636 Croats (1.57%)
- 146 Serbs (0.36%)

=== Religion ===
According to the 2013 census, the religious makeup of Velika Kladuša includes:

- 36,643 Muslims (90.66%)
- 305 Catholics (0.75%)
- 160 Eastern Orthodox (0.40%)
- 3,491 others (mostly other Muslims, 8.64%)

== Sports ==
Local football club Krajišnik have spent a few seasons in the second tier of Bosnia and Herzegovina's football pyramid.

== Notable people ==
- Baggio Husidić, footballer
- Husein Miljković, military commander
- Fikret Abdić, former mayor

== See also ==
- Bosanska Krajina
