= Stopno, Makole =

Stopno
- Location in Slovenia
- Coordinates: 46°20′21.67″N 15°42′19.39″E
- Country: Slovenia
- Traditional region: Styria
- Statistical region: Drava
- Municipality: Makole

Area
  - Total: 1.03 km^{2} (0.40 sq mi)
- Elevation: 243 m (797 ft)

Population (2020)
  - Total: 88

Stopno (pronounced [ˈstoːpnɔ]) is a small village on the left bank of the Dravinja River in the Municipality of Makole in northeastern Slovenia. The area is part of the traditional region of Styria. It is now included with the rest of the municipality in the Drava Statistical Region.

== Name ==
Stopno was attested in historical sources as Stopendorf, Steppendorf, and Ztopendorf (all in 1265–1267), and as Zemstamph in 1271. The name Stopno is derived from the Slovene common noun stopa 'stamp mill', referring to agricultural or other activity. As such, it is related to place names such as Stopče and Stope.

== History ==
Archaeological excavations prove that the Stopno area has been inhabited since prehistoric times; in 1995, many fragments of pottery from the Late Iron Age were found. The area later passed under Roman rule, and even later under Habsburg rule, where it remained until the end of the First World War.

=== Stopno as a municipality ===
After the March Revolution of 1848, self-governing municipalities were introduced in Austria-Hungary. In 1849, the emperor signed a temporary law on municipalities, which was introduced under the motto "The foundation of a free state is a free municipality." The new municipalities thus gained self-government in terms of concern for the safety of people and property, management of municipal property, health authorities, food control, roads maintenance, and other matters. This is how the former Municipality of Stopno was formed, which included the settlement of the same name (the settlements of Savinsko and Strug were then part of Stopno and not independent settlements).

This arrangement was only temporary, and in 1862 a framework state law on municipalities was passed, which was in force until the disintegration of the Austria-Hungary in 1918. This law allowed the arrangement of relatively pure self-government. Municipal bodies were elected in full, and special sources of income were recognized for municipalities. Municipalities had the opportunity to require villagers to carry out various work for the public good, such as arranging roads and cleaning ditches. Such projects were called kuluki.

In 1880, the Municipality of Stopno had a total of 314 inhabitants, of which 100 lived in the area of what is now Stopno, and the rest in Savinsko or Strug. In 1902, Andrej Finšgar was the mayor of the Municipality of Stopno, and his advisers were Matija Mesarič and Štefan Unuk.

After the First World War, in 1918, most Slovene ethnic territory was included in the Kingdom of Serbs, Croats and Slovenes (later the Kingdom of Yugoslavia), but Stopno still retained the status of a municipalitym and in 1931 it had a population of 317.

The former Municipality of Stopno, like other municipalities that form the Municipality of Makole today, contributed to the maintenance of churches and schools in Makole.

In 1933, a system of municipal elections was established, and the criterion was set that a municipality must have at least 3,000 inhabitants. Gradually, Stopno merged with the municipalities of Dežno, Jelovec-Makole, Pečke, Sveta Ana and Štatenberg, and formed the Municipality of Makole.

=== Stopno during interwar period ===
In 1937, Stopno (together with Strug and Savinsko) had a population of 332. In Krajevni leksikon Dravske banovine (Gazetteer of the Drava Banovina), Stopno is described as a village between Makole and Majšperk, where the valley floor is exposed to floods, and the road leads along an embankment and protected. The people there at that time were mainly engaged in agriculture and viticulture. Livestock, eggs, poultry, firewood and wood for tannin were sold in Makole.

=== During and after World War II ===
On April 6, Yugoslavia was invaded and its territory was split among several countries. Stopno, like all of Styria, was annexed by Germany and remained under it until the end of the war. In 1945, a local people's committee (KLO) was formed in Stopno, and in 1952 it was united with the municipal people's committee of Makole. Stopno was part of the Ptuj district in the communist Yugoslavia and, after the abolition of that district in 1965, it was part of the Maribor district until independence in 1991.

== Stopno today ==
In 2006, the municipality of Makole, which Stopno is still part of, was formed from the larger Municipality of Slovenska Bistrica. The Stopno Sports Association has been present in Stopno since 2005, and it maintains the asphalted village playground and the association's headquarters. Together with the village community of Stopno, it also holds various events, such as the annual cleaning campaign, setting up the maypole, and various sports activities. The residents are mostly engaged in agriculture or work in neighboring places.

== Nature ==
In the Stopno area, especially along the Dravinja River, there are floodplain meadows. Plants such as great burnet and meadow foxtail grow there. This area is a habitat for internationally protected butterfly species such as the large copper, alcon blue, and scarce large blue. Various protected species of birds also live there, such as the white stork, brown shrike, and common kingfisher. In Stopno there are also oxbow lakes and the remains of the old bed of the Dravinja River, where there are many amphibians, birds, mammals, dragonflies, beetles, and butterflies. Due to its biodiversity, this area is a Natura 2000 site.

== Cultural heritage ==
=== Village chapel-shrine ===
A closed chapel-shrine is located at the intersection of the roads to Majšperk, Stopno, and Makole. It was built in the second half of the 19th century, but the exact year and occasion are unknown. There is a roof rider with a rectangular floor plan, which stands out in a rounded part in the altar part. The chapel has a segmental portal, which is protected by a metal mesh door. The side walls have no articulations, and the back is illuminated by an oval opening. The chapel is yellow, the entrance is highlighted with a white border, and above the door there is the inscription Ave Marija. The roof is sheet metal and pyramidal. At the top is a sphere with a cross, which has a lancet tip and three bars. Inside the chapel, a statue of Our Lady of Lourdes stands on the altar, and the floor is tile. The chapel-shrine is entered in the register of immovable cultural heritage.

=== Žunkovič hayrack ===
Along the village road there is a roofed double hayrack with three paired segments, which has the status of a monument of local importance. The hayrack is wooden, is two-stories tall. and is covered by a steep gabled roof covered with a salon. The roof was once shaped with partial rafters and covered with straw or brick. The brackets are decoratively designed and supported by beams from the pillars. The upper parts of both gabled sides are closed with wooden nets. On one side of the gable, the consoles of the former balcony have been preserved, as well as the wooden construction of the interior with wooden single-frame stairs. The hayrack is a typical but rarely preserved farm building in the area, and it dates from the second half of the 19th century.

=== Mihelč cross ===
Along the village road in Stopno there is a wooden cross from 1921. The cross was erected in memory of a landowner who died while harvesting wood. The figure of Jesus Christ is depicted on the cross, and below it, on a simple wooden console, is a figure of Mary. The cross is covered with a segmental flat roof with a decorative border, and the back the crucifix is secured with wooden planks, which must be finished at the level of the crossbar.
