= Varoš =

Varoš from város meaning "city/town" may refer to:

- Varoš, Makole, a village in Slovenia
- Varoš, Split, an administrative division of Split, Croatia
- Varoš, Šibenik, an administrative division of Šibenik, Croatia
- Varoš, Prilep, a village now part of the city of Prilep, North Macedonia
- Varoš Gate, a historical gate of Belgrade, Serbia
- Đavolja Varoš, a geographical region of south Serbia noted for its "earth pyramids"
- Kotor Varoš, a town and municipality in Bosnia and Herzegovina
- Levanjska Varoš, a municipality in Osijek-Baranja county, Croatia
- Nova Varoš, a town and municipality in the Zlatibor District of Serbia
- Stara Varoš, Kragujevac, a municipality in the city of Kragujevac, Serbia
- Stara Varoš, Podgorica, a neighbourhood in the city of Podgorica, Montenegro
- Varoš Bosiljevski, a village in Croatia

== See also ==
- Varos (disambiguation)
