= Krbava (settlement) =

Krbava Крбава (Serbian)
- Location in Croatia
- Coordinates: 44.613215°N 15.667687°E
- Country: Croatia
- County: Lika-Senj
- Municipality: Udbina

Area
  - Total: 11.9 km^{2} (4.6 sq mi)

Population (2021)
  - Total: 35
  - Density: 2.9/km^{2} (7.6/sq mi)
- Time zone: UTC+1 (CET)

Krbava (Serbian Cyrillic: Крбава) is a village in Lika, Croatia, located in the Udbina municipality.

== Climate ==
Between 1982 and 1991, the coldest temperature was −27.4 °C (−17.3 °F), on 12 January 1985.

== Demographics ==
Village of Krbava: Population trends 1857–2021
v

population	719	774	584	622	635	577	631	602	383	380	328	248	183	134	38	37	35
	1857	1869	1880	1890	1900	1910	1921	1931	1948	1953	1961	1971	1981	1991	2001	2011	2021

Note:Iskazano pod imenom Pišač od 1857. do 1880. te u 1948., Pisač od 1890. do 1931. i Krbava od 1953. nadalje Sources: Croatian Bureau of Statistics publications
