= Bartholomew of Krbava =

Croatian manuscript illuminator (fl. 1400–1425)

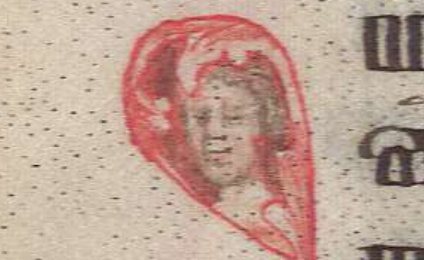
Self-portrait according to M. Pantelić from 1403 in Berlin missal

Bartholomew of Krbava (Croatian: Bartol Krbavac; fl. 1400–1425) was a Croatian manuscript illuminator, calligrapher and scribe. Several richly illuminated codexes are authored by and ascribed to him and his scriptorium, most notably the Berlin missal (1402), Beram missal and Roč missal (1421).

== Biography ==
Beram missal c. 1425

Historian Petar Runje identifies Bartol as a son of a local scribe and a citizen of Zadar, John, and his wife Florela as one of two children. The first recorded mention of Bartholomew was in 1399 in Zadar, when his father arranged for him to be sent to train as a goldsmith in Venice. This hypothesis is disputed by Ferenčak, stating that there were several scribes under that name during this period in Dalmatia and Croatia. In 1402, his first work, the Berlin missal, was completed somewhere in Krbava, which he wrote and illuminated for the priest Vuk, from the benedictine monastery of Saint George on the river Zrmanja. Because of turbulent times, specifically the dynastic wars between Sigismund of Luxembourg and Ladislaus of Naples, supported by Viceroy of Croatia Hrvoje Vukčić Hrvatinić, Batholomew withdrew from Obrovac to the north, probably in Bakar, and later to Istria. His later missals Roč and Beram Missals were made during the 1420s.

== Works ==
Ferenčak attributes four preserved manuscripts (three missals, one breviary) and two fragments to him and his scriptorium, which includes both the illuminations and the text.

- Berlin missal (1402), made in Krbava
- Roč missal (c. 1421)
- Beram missal, also known as Ljubljana Missal (c. 1425)
- Hum breviary
- Barban missal fragment (15th century)
- Tršćan breviary fragment (15th century)

M. Pantelić also attributes Bakar breviary to him.

== Gallery ==
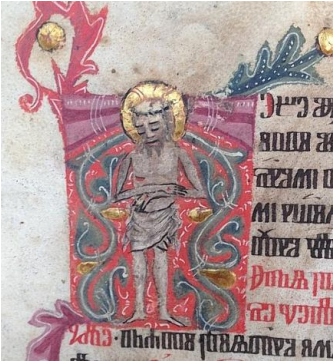
Suffering Christ, Berlin missal 1403

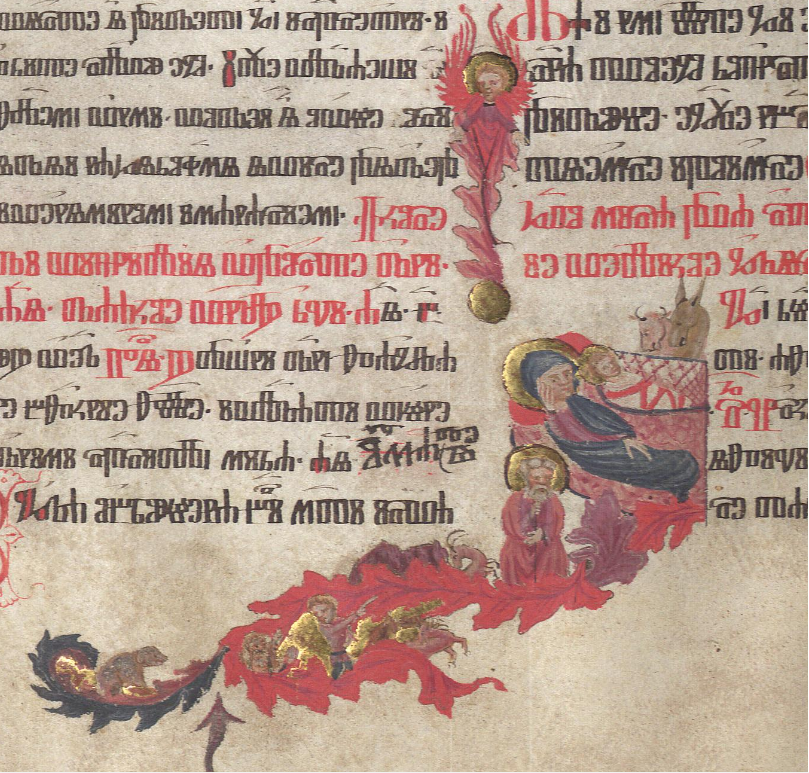
Birth of Christ, 1403

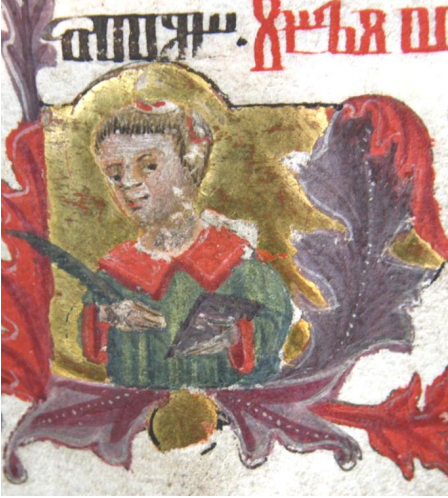
Saint Stephen Martyr
