= Strug =

Strug may refer to:

== People ==
- Andrzej Strug, Polish socialist politician
- Kerri Strug, American gymnast
- Mike Strug, American news anchor

== Places ==
- Strug, Slovenia, a settlement near Makole in northeastern Slovenia
- Strug (river), a river in Poland
- Veliki Strug, a river in Croatia

== Other ==
- Strug (boat), a type of historical Russian river boat
