= Jošan =

Josan Јошан (Serbian) Jošani
- Village
- Jošan
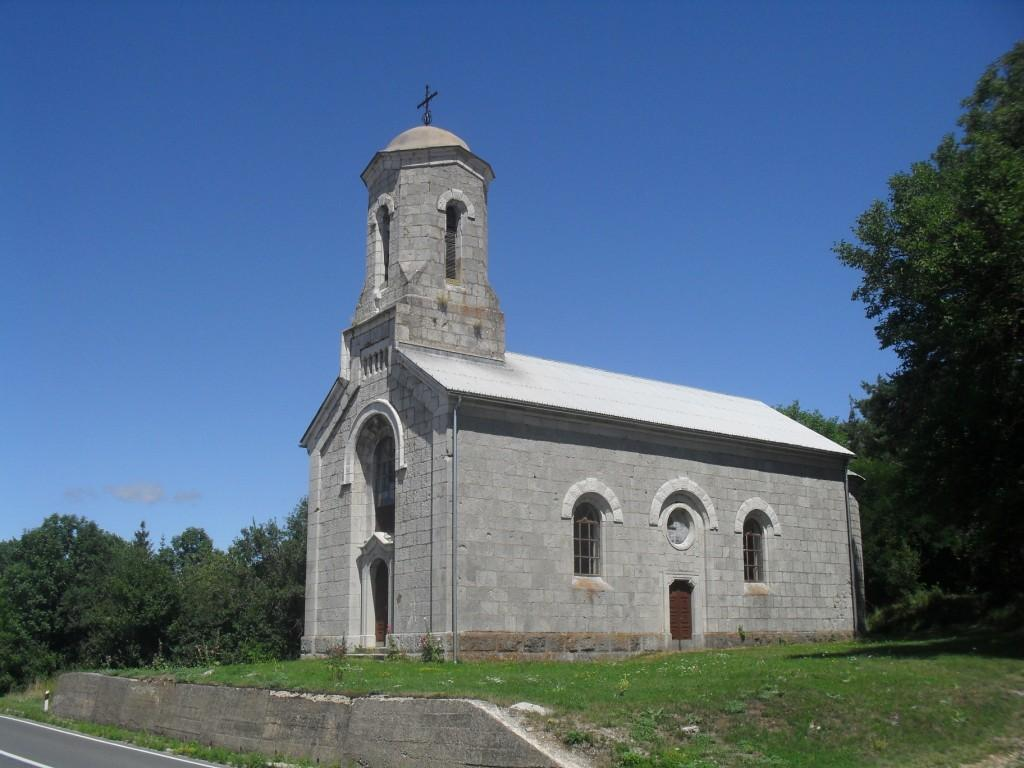
- Serbian Orthodox church in Jošan

- Location within Croatia
- Coordinates: 44.576182°N 15.748748°E
- Country: Croatia
- County: Lika-Senj
- Municipality: Udbina

Area
  - Total: 93.1 km^{2} (35.9 sq mi)

Population (2021)
  - Total: 38
  - Density: 0.41/km^{2} (1.1/sq mi)
- Time zone: UTC+1 (CET)
  - Summer (DST): UTC+2 (CEST)

Jošan (Serbian Cyrillic: Јошан) or Jošani is a village in Krbava, Croatia. It is located on the D1 highway between Pećani and Udbina.

== History ==
The 1712–14 census of Lika and Krbava registered 589 inhabitants, all of whom were Serbian Orthodox ("Vlach").

== Population ==
According to the 2011 census, the total population of the settlement was 66, with the majority of ethnic Serbs. The 1991 census registered 227 residents, 223 of whom were Serbs.
