= MBL =

MBL may refer to:

== Education ==
- Marine Biological Laboratory, an international center for research and education in biology, biomedicine, and ecology
- Master of Business and Law, a two-year master's degree credential
- National Security College (Israel)

== Politics ==
- Free Bolivia Movement (Spanish: Movimiento Bolivia Libre), a political party in Bolivia
- Free Brazil Movement (Portuguese: Movimento Brasil Livre), a liberal-conservative political movement in Brazil

== Science ==
- Mannan-binding lectin (or mannose-binding lectin), a protein capable of binding certain sugars and polysaccharides
- Many-body localization, a state of matter in which a local set of particles cannot reach thermal equilibrium
- Monoclonal B-cell lymphocytosis, a condition that resembles chronic lymphocytic leukemia (CLL)

== Sport ==
- Malaysian Basketball League, former name of the Malaysia National Basketball League, the pre-eminent men's basketball league in Malaysia
- Midwest Basketball League, a semi-professional men's basketball league which operates in the Midwestern United States

== Transportation ==
- Manistee County-Blacker Airport (IATA/FAA code MBL), an airport in the US state of Michigan
- Montclair-Boonton Line, a commuter rail line in North Jersey in the US state of New Jersey
- Montebello Bus Lines, a local transit agency serving the San Gabriel Valley in Southern California

== Other uses ==
- Marie Byrd Land, region of West Antarctica
- Macquarie Bank Limited, name of the Macquarie Group (a publicly traded Australian financial-services corporation) prior to its restructuring in 2007
- Berlin missal (MBl), 15th century Glagolitic manuscript
