= Stara Varoš =

Stara Varoš may refer to:

- Stara Varoš, Kragujevac, a municipality in the city of Kragujevac, Serbia
- Stara Varoš, Podgorica, a neighbourhood in the city of Podgorica, Montenegro
