= Stopno =

Stopno is a Slovene place name that may refer to:

- Stopno, Makole, a village in the Municipality of Makole, northeastern Slovenia
- Stopno, Škocjan, a village in the Municipality of Škocjan, southeastern Slovenia
