= Makole =

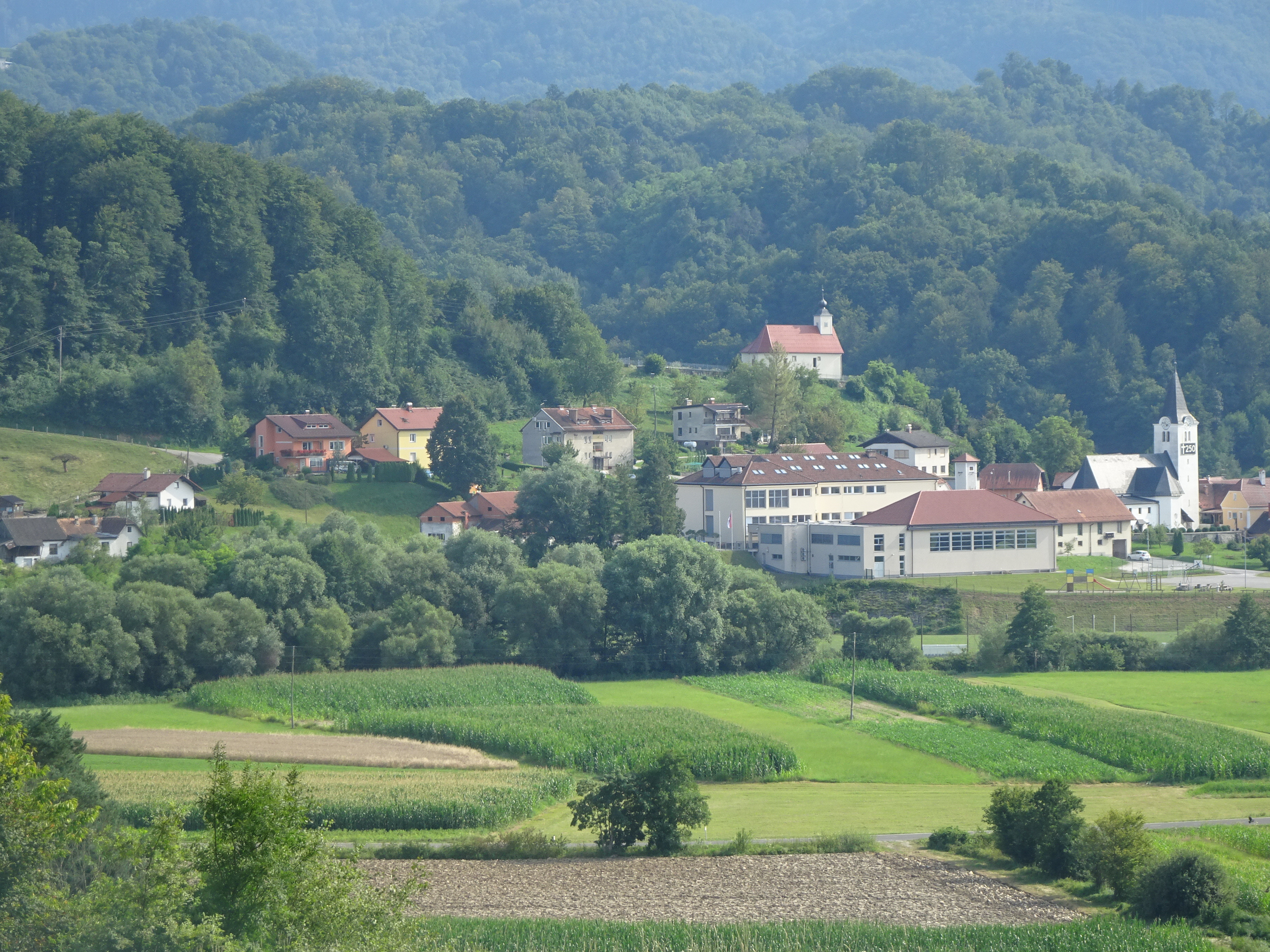
- View of Makole from Štatenberg Mansion

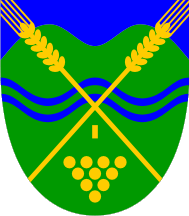
- Coat of arms

- Location in Slovenia
- Coordinates: 46°19′02.50″N 15°40′00.80″E
- Country: Slovenia
- Traditional region: Styria
- Statistical region: Drava
- Municipality: Makole

Area
  - Total: 1.02 km^{2} (0.39 sq mi)
- Elevation: 250.0 m (820.2 ft)

Population (2019)
  - Total: 221

Makole (pronounced [ˈmaːkɔlɛ], German: Maxau) is a settlement in northeastern Slovenia. It is the seat of the Municipality of Makole. It lies in the Dravinja Valley. The area is part of the traditional region of Styria. It was first mentioned in written documents dating to 1375 and was also granted market rights.

== History ==
Cultural sights in the village are the parish church of St. Andrew and the late Gothic St. Leonard's Church. Jelovec Creek (Slovene: Jelovški potok) flows through the settlement and then flows into the Dravinja not far away.

On the 487-meter (1,598 ft) hill above Makole stands the Old Castle of Makole, and on the other side of the Dravinja Valley is Štatenberg Mansion. The surrounding natural sights are the ravine and a climbing area known as Šoder graben, the karst Belojača Cave, which is the longest cave in the Haloze area at 550 meters (1,800 ft), and a karst shaft near Domišak.

A forma viva is set up along the local road.

=== World War II ===
In 1941 and 1942, several Liberation Front groups from Makole and its surroundings connected with the Yugoslav Partisans in Maribor and Rogaška Slatina. In the summer of 1942, Axis forces discovered collaborators with the liberation movement, arrested them, shot 9 of them, and sent the rest to concentration camps. In Stari Grad near Makole, on February 6, 1945, Axis forces destroyed a Partisan courier station and killed 8 couriers.

== Landmarks ==
The parish church in the settlement is dedicated to Saint Andrew and belongs to the Roman Catholic Archdiocese of Maribor. It is a Gothic building that was first mentioned in 1441. In the 18th century, it was restyled in the Baroque.

== Gallery ==
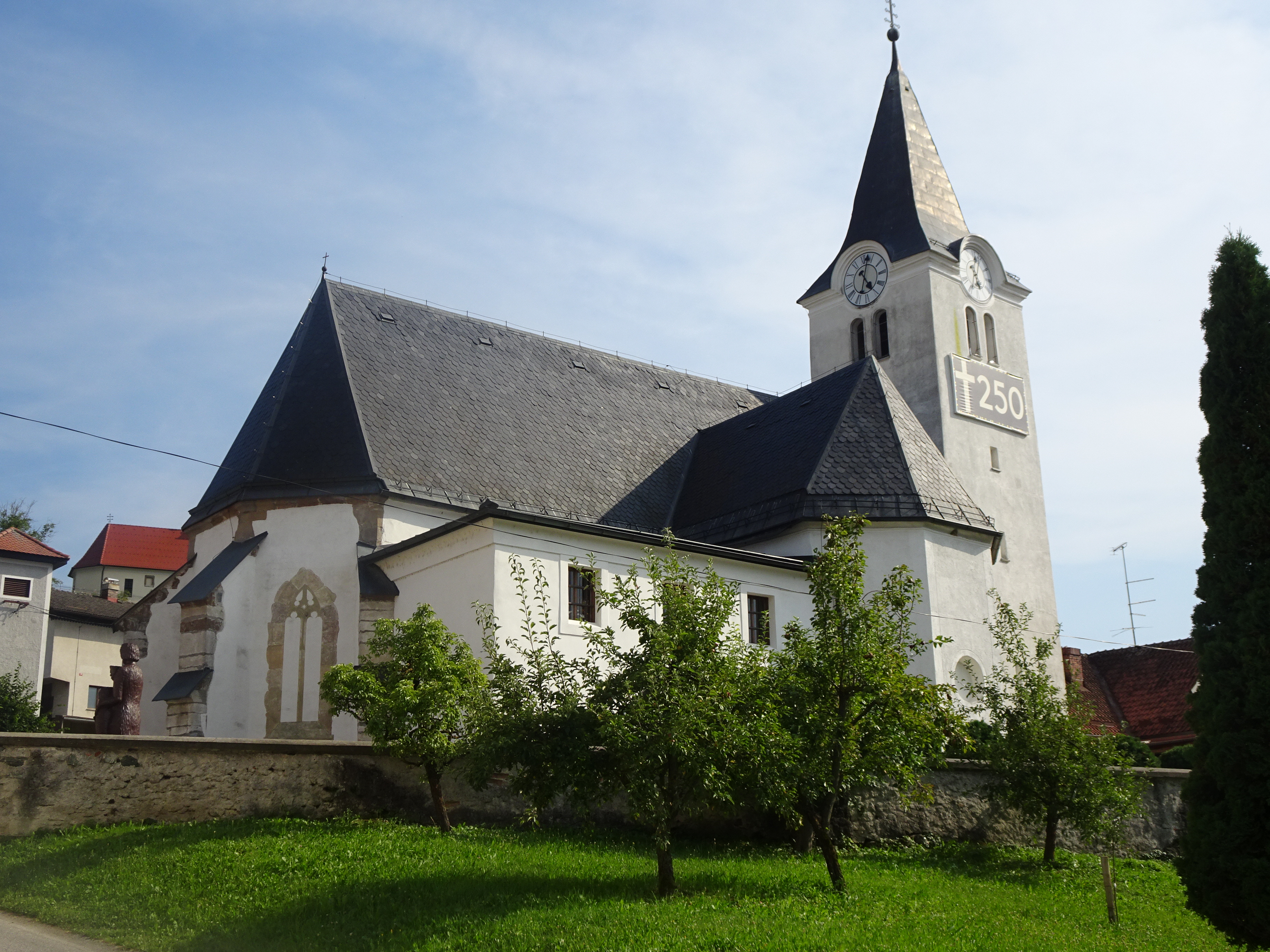
Parish church of Saint Andrew

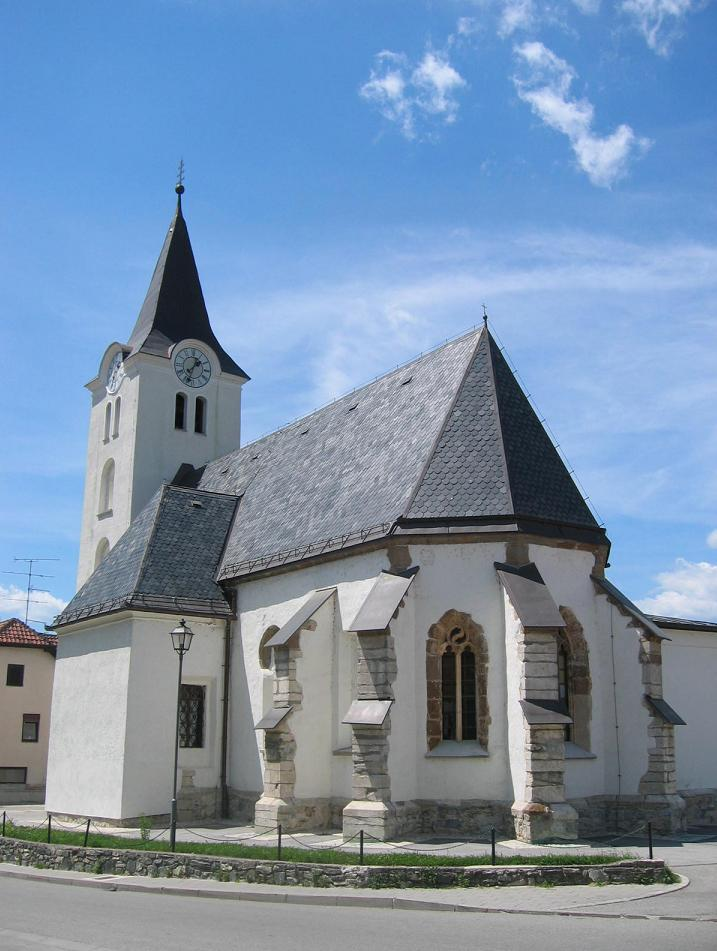
Parish church of Saint Andrew

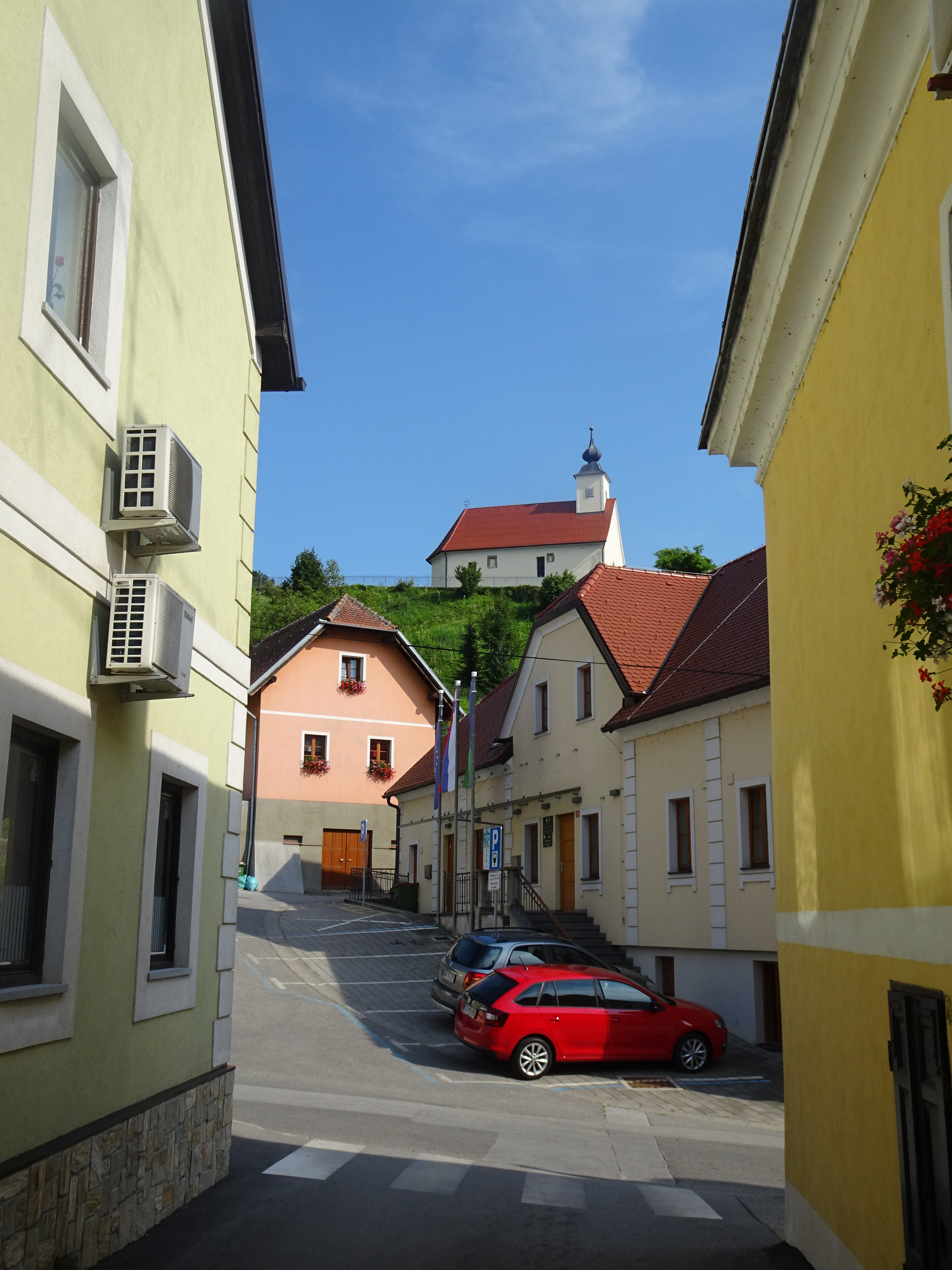
View of the municipal building and the church of Saint Lenart

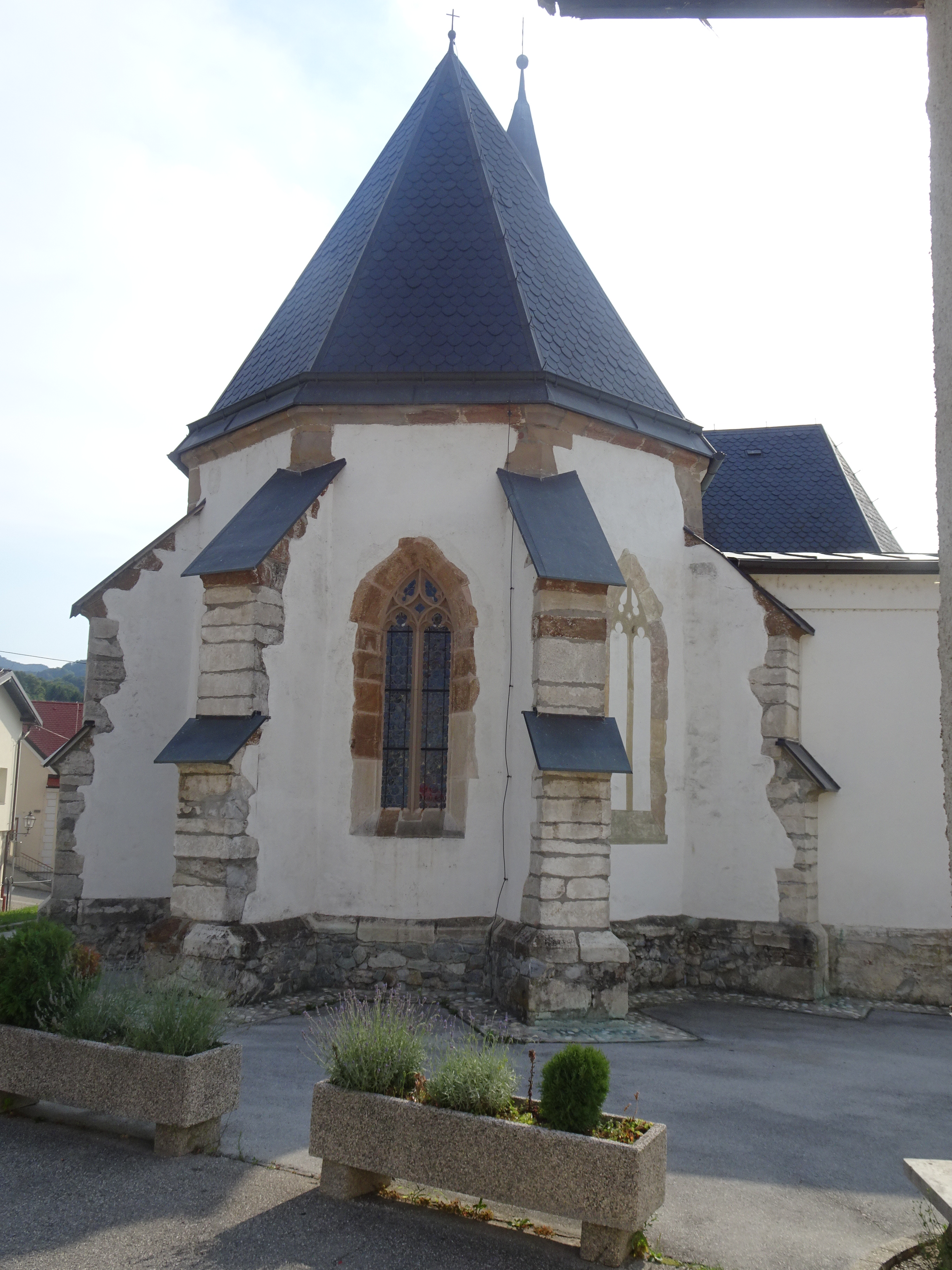

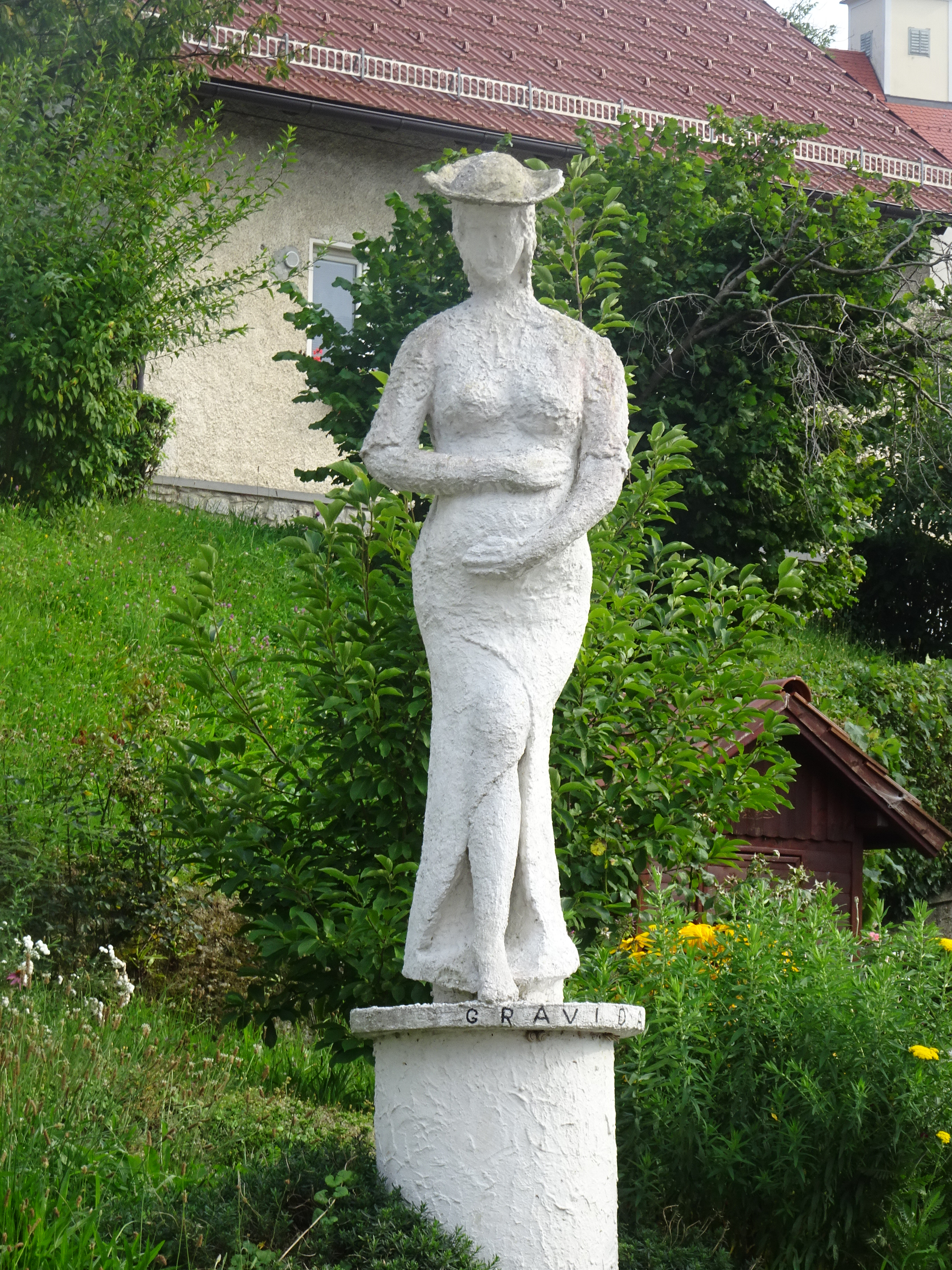
Makole forma viva
