= Mostečno =

- Location in Slovenia
- Coordinates: 46°20′23.13″N 15°40′5.19″E
- Country: Slovenia
- Traditional region: Styria
- Statistical region: Drava
- Municipality: Makole

Area
  - Total: 2.12 km^{2} (0.82 sq mi)
- Elevation: 252.7 m (829 ft)

Population (2002)
  - Total: 161

Mostečno (pronounced [mɔˈsteːtʃnɔ], German: Mostetschno) is a settlement in the Municipality of Makole in northeastern Slovenia. It lies in the valley of Ložnica Creek, a left tributary of the Dravinja River. The area is part of the traditional region of Styria. It is now included with the rest of the municipality in the Drava Statistical Region.
