= Šalamunić =

Šalamunić Шаламунић (Serbian)
- Location in Croatia
- Coordinates: 44.649°N 15.630°E
- Country: Croatia
- County: Lika-Senj
- Municipality: Udbina

Area
  - Total: 15.4 km^{2} (5.9 sq mi)

Population (2021)
  - Total: 24
  - Density: 1.6/km^{2} (4.0/sq mi)
- Time zone: UTC+1 (CET)

Šalamunić (Serbian Cyrillic: Шаламунић) is a village in Lika, Croatia, located in the Udbina municipality, between Korenica and Lički Osik. The population is 38 (census 2011).
