= Berlin missal =

15th-century Glagolitic manuscript

- Berlin State Library, Ms. Ham. 444
- High resolution scan
- Also known as: Berlinski misal, Misal Bartola Krbavca
- Type: missal
- Place of origin: Krbava
- Language: Croatian Church Slavonic
- Scribe: Bartol Krbavac
- Material: Parchment
- Size: 31.5 x 21.5 cm
- Format: 2 columns of 31 rows
- Script: Glagolitic
- Discovered: 1956

The Berlin missal (Serbo-Croatian: Berlinski misal, Misal Bartola Krbavca; sometimes abbreviated MBl, MBrl, or MBer) is a Glagolitic missal written and illuminated by Bartol Krbavac, who completed it in 1402.

It was kept in Zadar as late as 1627, then in Rome 1738–1742, possibly catalogued there in 1771, then in London where it was catalogued and indexed by professor Capiran at the Kensington House on 21 September 1808, and from 1822 on in Berlin.

It entered the Berlin State Library with the Hamilton Collection in 1882. Thanks to the Roman catalogue, the existence of a Glagolitic missal written in 1404 was known to Karlo Horvat in 1911, from whom it was relayed by Vinko Premuda, but considered lost. It was not rediscovered by Glagolitic scholars until 1956, making it one of the last Glagolitic missals to have been studied in detail.

A microfilm of the manuscript was made in 1977, which was digitized in 2010 and posted to Izvori.stin, but that website is closed to the public for legal reasons and the scan was of relatively poor quality. On 7 July 2022, the Berlin State Library published a scan on their digital library page, making the manuscript available for all to view.

== Bibliography ==
- Čunčić, Marica; Mokrović, Ljiljana; Magdić, Antonio; Ferenčak, Ivan; Botica, Ivan (2010). "Berlinski misal". Izvori Staroslavenskog instituta (in Croatian).
- Horvat, Karlo (1911). "Glagolaši u Dalmaciji početkom 17. vijeka t. j. godine 1602–1603" [Glagolites in Dalmatia at the Beginning of the 17th Century, that is, in the Years 1602–1603]. Starine Jugoslavenske akademije znanosti i umjetnosti (in Serbo-Croatian). 33: 537–564.
- Premuda, Vinko (1912). "Osvrt na djela o glagolici" [Review of Works on Glagolitic]. Vjesnik Staroslavenske akademije u Krku (in Croatian). 1 (published 1913): 86–120.
