= Stranske Makole =

- Location in Slovenia
- Coordinates: 46°19′20.44″N 15°39′40.11″E
- Country: Slovenia
- Traditional region: Styria
- Statistical region: Drava
- Municipality: Makole

Area
  - Total: 1.08 km^{2} (0.42 sq mi)
- Elevation: 251.4 m (825 ft)

Population (2002)
  - Total: 126

Stranske Makole (pronounced [ˈstɾaːnskɛ ˈmaːkɔlɛ], German: Seitenmaxau) is a settlement on the left bank of the Dravinja River in the Municipality of Makole in northeastern Slovenia. The area is part of the traditional region of Styria and is now included with the rest of the municipality in the Drava Statistical Region.
