= Vojislav Korać =

Serbian historian (1924–2010)

- Born: 6 June 1924; Debelo Brdo, Primorje-Krajina Oblast, Kingdom of Serbs, Croats and Slovenes
- Died: 29 October 2010 (aged 86); Belgrade, Serbia

Vojislav Korać (1924–2010) was a Yugoslav and Serbian historian, university professor and academic. An ethnic Serb, he was born in Debelo Brdo in Udbina, Kingdom of Yugoslavia (now Croatia).

== Selected works ==
- Ђурић, Војислав Ј.; Ћирковић, Сима; Кораћ, Војислав (1990). Пећка патријаршија. Београд-Приштина: Југословенска ревија, Јединство. ISBN 9788674130575.
