= Modruš-Rijeka County =

Historic county of the Kingdom of Croatia-Slavonia

Modruš-Rijeka County Modruško-riječka županija Modrus-Fiume vármegye
- County of the Kingdom of Croatia-Slavonia; County of the Kingdom of Serbs, Croats, and Slovenes (1918–1922)
- 1886–1922
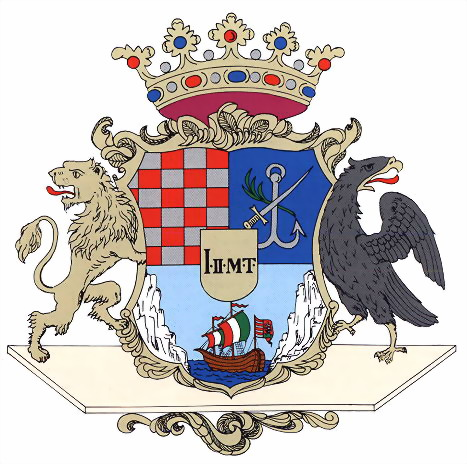
- Coat of arms

- Location of the County (red) within the Kingdom of Croatia-Slavonia (white)
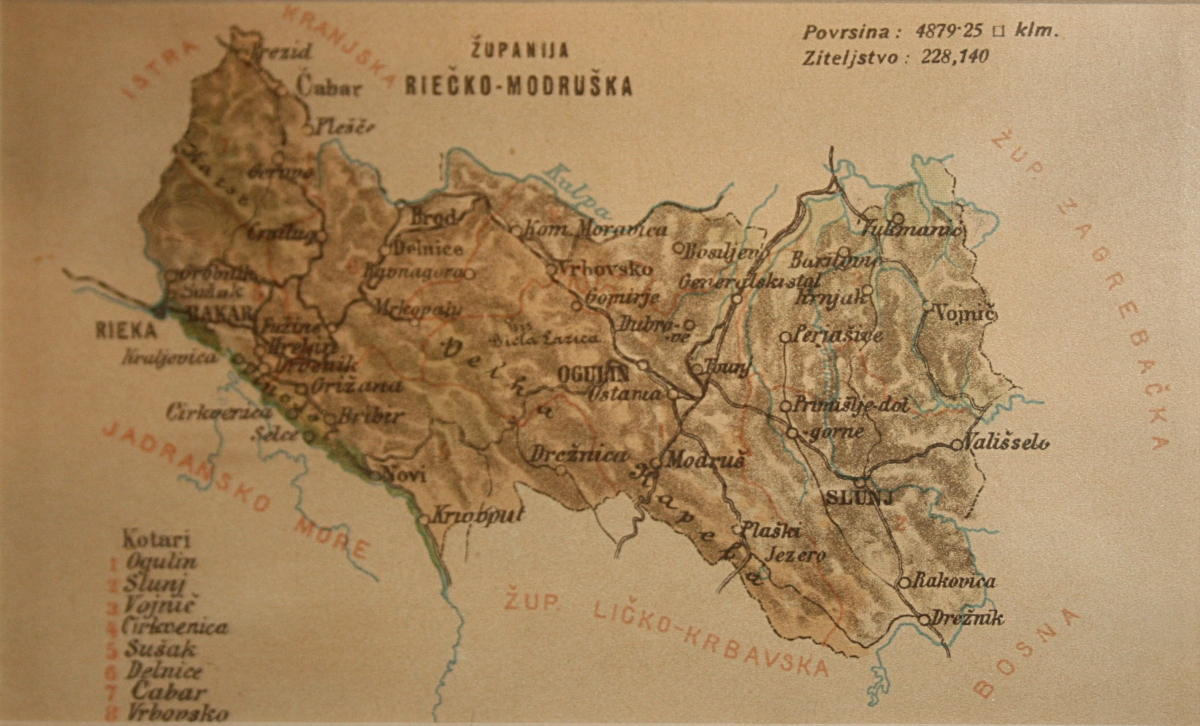
- Old map of Modruš-Rijeka County
- Capital: Ogulin
- Area
  - Coordinates: 45°16′N 15°14′E
  - 1910: 4,879 km^{2} (1,884 sq mi)
- Population
  - 1910: 231,654
- History
  - Military Frontier formally disbanded: 1881
  - Established: 1886
  - State of Slovenes, Croats and Serbs secedes from Austria-Hungary: 29 October 1918
  - Joins the Kingdom of Serbs, Croats and Slovenes: 1 December 1918
  - Treaty of Trianon: 4 June 1920
  - Vidovdan Constitution comes into effect: 1922
Preceded by
Rijeka County
Zagreb County
Croatian Military Frontier
Succeeded by
Primorsko-Krajina Oblast
- Today part of: Croatia

The Modruš-Rijeka County (Croatian: Modruško-riječka županija; Hungarian: Modrus-Fiume vármegye) was a historic administrative subdivision (županija) of the Kingdom of Croatia-Slavonia. Croatia-Slavonia was an autonomous kingdom within the Lands of the Crown of Saint Stephen (Transleithania), the Hungarian part of the dual Austro-Hungarian Empire. Its territory is now in western Croatia. Modruš is a small town near Ogulin; Rijeka (then officially Fiume) is a large city on the Adriatic coast. However, Rijeka was not part of the Modruš-Rijeka County, but under the direct administration of Hungary. The capital of the county was Ogulin.

== Geography ==
The Modruš-Rijeka County shared borders with the Austrian (Cisleithanian) lands of Istria (part of the Austrian Littoral) and Carniola, the Austro-Hungarian condominium of Bosnia and Herzegovina, the Croatian-Slavonian counties of Zagreb and Lika-Krbava and the city/corpus separatum of Fiume. The county had a strip of Adriatic Sea coast. Its area was 4,879 km^{2} (1,884 sq mi) around 1910.

== History ==
Most of the territory of the county was part of the Kingdom of Croatia when it entered a personal union with the Kingdom of Hungary in 1102, and with it became part of the Habsburg monarchy in 1526. The southern part of the later county around Ogulin was part of the Croatian Military Frontier established in 1553.

From 1466 until the late 18th century Rijeka (under the German name Sankt Veit am Flaum or the Italian and Hungarian name Fiume) was part of the Habsburg Erblande, forming part of Inner Austria. In 1776 it was transferred to Croatia, then in 1779 was subordinated directly to the Hungarian Crown as a corpus separatum, i.e. it became a formally separate entity, part of neither Croatia nor Hungary-proper.

The area became part of the Napoleonic Illyrian Provinces in 1809. After the 1815 Congress of Vienna the area was reincorporated into the Austrian Empire: the southern part returned to the Military Frontier; the northern part (the former French Croatie civile province) briefly remained with the newly-established Kingdom of Illyria, then was restored to Croatia, forming part of Zagreb County, while the Fiume was restored to its previous status as well as being the centre of the Croatian Littoral district.

In the decade following the 1848 revolutions Fiume formed part of the autonomous Kingdom of Croatia, becoming the seat of the new Fiume/Rijeka County. The period of absolutism came to an end in October 1860 and with it Fiume was restored to its previous status.

An 1885 map showing Croatia-Slavonia and south-western Hungary before the final restructuring of the Croatian-Slavonian counties. Fiume County (pale blue) and Ogulin-Slunj County (peach) can be seen in the far left.

Following the Compromise of 1867 which transformed the Austrian Empire into Austria-Hungary, Fiume remained a corpus separatum within the Lands of the Crown of Saint Stephen (Transleithania), although its status was disputed by Croatia-Slavonia until the dissolution of Austria-Hungary in 1918. Between 1871 and 1881 the Military Frontier was disbanded and the counties of Croatia-Slavonia were re-organised. Ogulin-Slunj County was formed from the merger of the former districts of the Ogulin (III) and Slunj (IV) regiments.

By 1886 the counties of Croatia-Slavonia had taken their final form. Modruš-Rijeka County was formed from Rijeka County, the bulk of Ogulin-Slunj County and an area around Severin na Kupi and Bosiljevo formerly belonging to Zagreb County. The south-western-most parts of Ogulin-Slunj County around Senj, Brinje and Krivi Put became the Brinje district and part of the Senj district of Lika-Krbava County while the former exclaves of the Slunj Regiment were transferred to Zagreb County.

In October 1918 Croatia-Slavonia seceded from Austria-Hungary as part of the State of Slovenes, Croats and Serbs, which de facto merged with the Kingdom of Serbia to form the Kingdom of Serbs, Croats, and Slovenes (later renamed to Yugoslavia) that December; this was formally recognised in 1920 by the Treaty of Trianon. In 1922 the Vidovdan Constitution came into force, replacing the Austro-Hungarian counties (and Serbian districts) with oblasts, replacing Modruš-Rijeka County with the larger Primorje-Krajina Oblast and nothing between the kotar and the oblasts.

Since 1991, when Croatia became independent from Yugoslavia, the county's former territory has been part of Croatia.

== Demographics ==
In 1895, the county was divided into 9 kotars: Čabar, Delnice, Novi, Ogulin, Slunj, Sušak, Vojnić, Vrbovsko and Bakar. Its total area was 4,879 square kilometres (1,884 mi^{2}), with 36,322 houses and a population of 220,629. Its 851 villages and 657 hamlets were divided for taxation purposes into 211 porezne obćine.

In 1900, the county had a population of 228,452 people and was composed of the following linguistic communities:

- Croatian: 150,982 (66.1%)
- Serbian: 73,604 (32.2%)
- Hungarian: 601 (0.3%)
- German: 512 (0.2%)
- Slovak: 58 (0.0%)
- Ruthenian: 4 (0.0%)
- Romanian: 3 (0.0%)
- Other or unknown: 2,688 (1.2%)

According to the census of 1900, the county was composed of the following religious communities:

- Roman Catholic: 154,276 (67.5%)
- Greek Orthodox: 73,632 (32.2%)
- Jewish: 335 (0.2%)
- Lutheran: 128 (0.1%)
- Calvinist: 66 (0.0%)
- Greek Catholic: 8 (0.0%)
- Unitarian: 0 (0.0%)
- Other or unknown: 7 (0.0%)

In 1910, the county had a population of 231,654 people and was composed of the following linguistic communities:

- Croatian: 152,210 (65.7%)
- Serbian: 74,894 (32.3%)
- Hungarian: 899 (0.4%)
- German: 592 (0.3%)
- Slovak: 64 (0.0%)
- Romanian: 6 (0.0%)
- Ruthenian: 4 (0.0%)
- Other or unknown: 2,985 (1.3%)

According to the census of 1910, the county was composed of the following religious communities:

- Roman Catholic: 156,060 (67.4%)
- Greek Orthodox: 74,941 (32.4%)
- Jewish: 382 (0.2%)
- Lutheran: 117 (0.1%)
- Calvinist: 101 (0.0%)
- Greek Catholic: 39 (0.0%)
- Unitarian: 4 (0.0%)
- Other or unknown: 10 (0.0%)

== Governance ==
=== 1920 Skupština election ===
In the 1920 Kingdom of Serbs, Croats and Slovenes Constitutional Assembly election, representatives were only guaranteed at the level of Županija; in the case of Modruš-Rijeka 8 representatives.

List of candidates for Article 13 Representative 1:

- Bogdan Medaković (NRS), advocate from Zagreb
- Tomislav Tomljenović (DSD), former Ban of Croatia from Zagreb
- Vladimir Čopić (KPJ), journalist from Senj
- Petar Dobrinić (HPSS), businessman from Podvožić
- Franko Potočnjak (Independent), lawyer from Zagreb
- Zdravko Lenac (SS), lawyer from Ogulin
- Dragutin Hrvoj (HSP), legal secretary from Zagreb
- Vjekoslav Spinčić (HZ), professor emeritus from Zagreb

List of candidates for Article 13 Representative 2:

- Milovan Grba (NRS), professor from Zagreb
- Valerijan Pribićević (DSD), archimandrite from Jaska
- Grujo Lugarić (KPJ), carpenter from Zagreb
- Stanko Šibenik (HPSS), businessman from Lipa
- Ante Majnarić (Independent), landowner from Ravna Gora
- Rafajlo Perić (SS), party treasurer from Zagreb
- Ivan Mikan (HSP), parish priest from Slunj
- Cezar Akačić (HZ), pharmacist from Zagreb

List of candidates for Article 13 Representative 3:

- Lazo Počula (NRS), farmer from Lipovača
- Milan Popović (DSD), advocate from Slunj
- Ivan Majnarić (KPJ), worker from Delnice
- Josip Kuretić (HPSS), landowner from Brod Moravice
- Ante Majnarić (Independent), agrarian surveyor from Ogulin
- Martin Grišnik (SS), villager from Lukovdol
- Edo Magdić (HSP), villager from Ogulin
- Peroslav Paskijević-Čikara (HZ), business chamber treasurer from Zagreb

List of candidates for Article 13 Representative 4:

- Vaso Dudković (NRS), farmer from Veljun
- Josip Majnarić (DSD), agrarian reform inspector from Ogulin
- Josip Lončarić (KPJ), mason from Selce
- Mato Luketić (HPSS), villager from Gornje Zagorje
- Ivan Mikić (Independent), landowner from Ogulin
- Abdon Glavan (SS), sea captain from Kostrena
- Nikola Rubčić (HSP), villager from Rakovica
- Lacko Križ (HZ), merchant from Zagreb

List of candidates for Article 13 Representative 5:

- Nikola Jagodić (NRS), farmer from Tržić
- Dragić Generalović (DSD), farmer from Tušilović
- Pavao Kuhar (KPJ), peddler from Ogulin
- Vale Ulaković (HPSS), villager from Varoš
- Franjo Antonić (Independent), landowner from Bribir
- Joso Jurašić (SS), landowner from Ogulin
- Jure Juričić (HSP), villager from Lug
- Stanko Kombol (HZ), cooper from Bribir

List of candidates for Article 13 Representative 6:

- Miloš Opačić (NRS), farmer from Tušilović
- Sava N. Kosanović (DSD), legal graduate from Plaški
- Pavao Kocian (KPJ), painter from Kraljevica
- Janko Mušnjak (HPSS), villager from Donji Velemerić
- Josip Lončarić (Independent), industrialist from Skrad
- Jakov Crnković (SS), villager from Crni Lug
- Rafael Pađen (HSP), businessman from Ledenice
- Josip Benković (HZ), villager from Bošt

List of candidates for Article 14 Representative 1:

- Ljubomir Miljušević (NRS), advocate from Karlovac
- Juraj Kučić (DSD), retired Veliki Župan from Ogulin
- Zvonimir Švrljuga (KPJ), advocate from Hreljin
- Stjepan Košutić (HPSS), legal secretary from Donja Stubica
- Kazimir Jelušić (Independent), public defender from Zagreb
- Dragan Turk (SS), economist from Zagreb
- Grga Hećimović (HSP), professor from Ogulin
- Augustin Juretić (HZ), worker's organisation treasurer from Zagreb

List of candidates for Article 14 Representative 2:

- Jovan Stevanović (NRS), advocate from Zagreb
- Ivan Sobol (DSD), doctor from Crikvenica
- Vladislav Fabijančić (KPJ), professor from Ljubljana
- Đuro Basariček (HPSS), accountant of Narodna zaštita from Zagreb
- Bogdan Šafarić (Independent), businessman from Skrad
- Vladimir Mamić (SS), legal secretary from Zagreb
- Josip Torbar (HSP), lawyer from Zagreb
- Milan Sokolić (HZ), lawyer from Ogulin

Results
Kotar	Voters	Electors	Electors (%)	DSD	HPSS	KPJ	HSP	NRS	HZ	SS	Independent
Novi	3638	1361	37.4%	57	46	726	40	6	226	215	246
Crikvenica	4666	2125	45.5%	174	20	1614	6	8	268	5	35
Ogulin	11,424	7507	65.7%	3644	2178	300	949	169	208	27	31
Vojnić	10,173	4680	45.6%	1823	1494	21	18	1221	92	7	4
Slunj	14,786	7075	47.8%	2871	559	39	2894	483	169	47	13
Sušak	3089	1519	49.2%	512	18	702	17	13	238	8	11
Čabar	2187	821	37.5%	124	496	67	16	6	84	17	11
Grad Bakar	695	372	53.5%	190	3	95	4	5	66	1	8
Vrbovsko	4455	2693	60.4%	312	1557	495	5	117	132	23	51
Delnice	6346	3301	52.0%	251	1460	915	42	9	513	66	44

Representatives elected under article 13 as a result:

1. Tomislav Tomljenović (DSD)
2. Valerijan Pribićević (DSD)
3. Petar Dobrinić (HPSS)
4. Stanko Šibenik (HPSS)
5. Vladimir Čopić (KPJ)
6. Dragutin Hrvoj (HSP)

Representatives elected under article 14 as a result:

1. Juraj Kučić (DSD)
2. Stjepan Košutić (HPSS)

== Subdivisions ==
In the early 20th century, the subdivisions of Modruš-Rijeka county were:

Districts
District	Capital
Čabar	Čabar
Cirkvenica	Crikvenica
Delnice	Delnice
Ogulin	Ogulin
Sušak	Bakar
Szluin	Slunj
Vojnić	Vojnić
Vrbovsko	Vrbovsko

== See also ==
- Karlovac and Primorje-Gorski Kotar counties of Croatia

== Bibliography ==
- Matić, Zdravko (22 December 2004). "Osnivanje i rad "Napretkovih" organizacija na području Hrvatskog primorja i Gorskog kotara (1928. - 1950.)" [The Foundation and Work of "Napredak" Organisations on the Territory of Hrvatsko Primorje and Gorski Kotar]. Časopis za suvremenu povijest (in Croatian). 36 (3): 1183–1204. ISSN 1848-9079.
