= Cathedral of St. James Senior in Krbava =

Coordinates: 44°31′49″N 15°46′32″E

Cathedral of Saint James Senior
- Cathedral of Saint James Senior in Krbava
- Katedrala sv. Jakova Starijeg
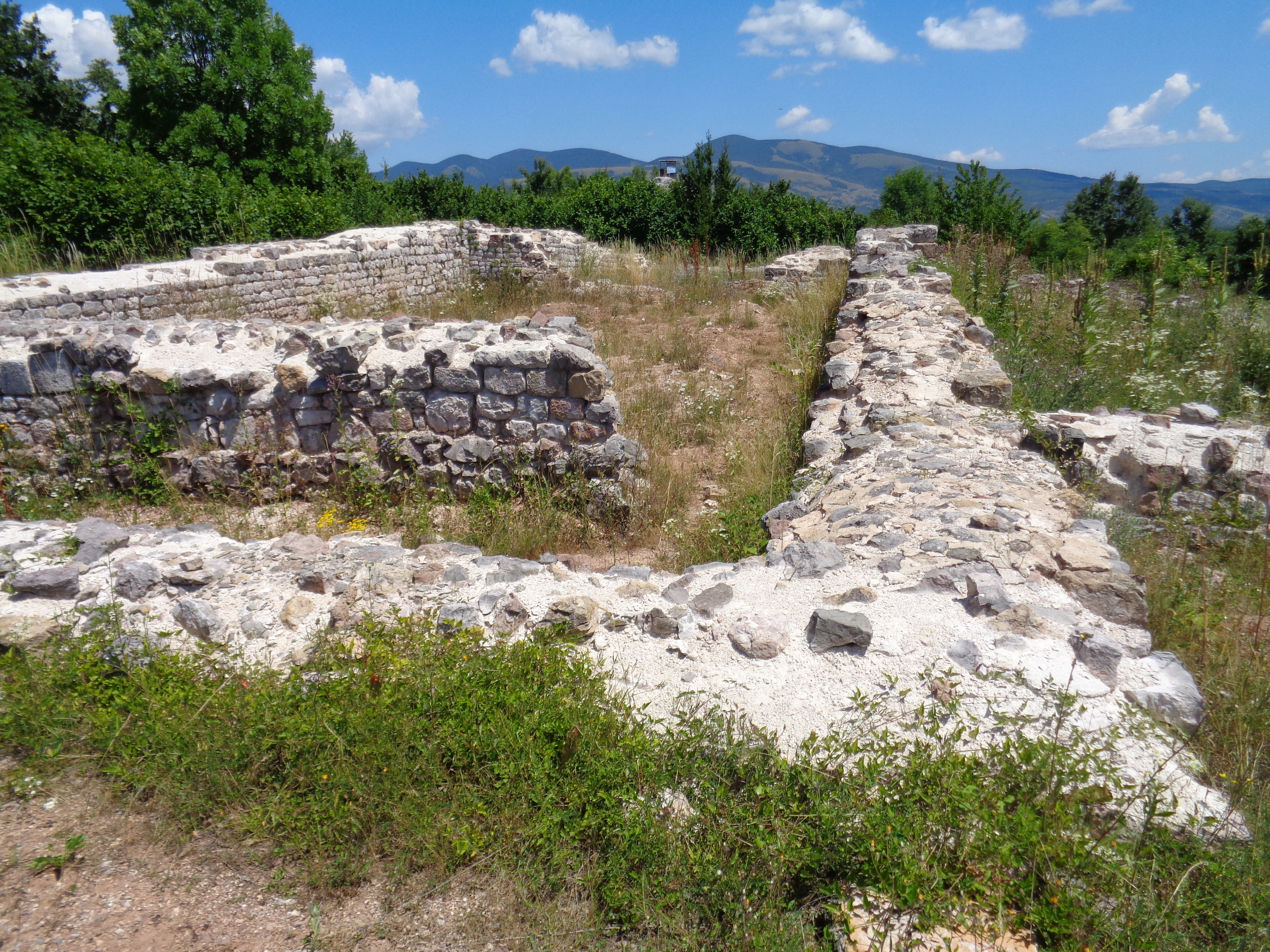
- The remains of the cathedral near Udbina.
- Cathedral of Saint James Senior
- Location: Udbina
- Country: Croatia
- Denomination: Catholic

History
- Founder: Split church council of 1185
- Dedication: St. James the Great
- Dedicated: 1431

Architecture
- Functional status: Destroyed
- Architectural type: Cathedral
- Style: Gothic
- Demolished: 16th century

Administration
- Diocese: Krbava Diocese

Cultural Good of Croatia
- Type: Protected cultural good
- Reference no.: Z-5932

Cathedral of St. James Senior (Karija, Korija) was a mediaeval Roman Catholic church in what was once Krbava (near nowadays Udbina). It was consecrated to St. James, the patron saint of former Diocese of Krbava. The information about consecration of Krbava Cathedral to St. James Senior was found by bishop Mile Bogović, while searching the Vatican Archives in 1997.

According to some indications, the area of the cathedral was closely related to nearby church of Sv. Marka Groba.

== History ==
The diocese of Krbava which was centered around the cathedral of St. James Senior was first founded in 1185 on provincial Church Council in Split. At a time, it was a first diocese located behind Mount Velebit, in county of Krbava. The first bishop of Krbava diocese was named Matej (Matthew). The territory which diocese covered stretched as far as Trsat.

The Vatican Archives document which mentions the consecration of the cathedral is dated to the year 1431, however, both diocese and the cathedral are likely even older since another document from 1389 mentions some dispute between Zagreb Capitol and bishop of Krbava. There was also a Francisian Monastery nearby, founded in 1373. An old fort was erected next to the cathedral to protect it, which was located east of the cathedral.

The diocese of Krbava existed until appearance in Ottomans in the area and their subsequent conquests. In 1460, due to ever increasing Ottoman akinji raids, the diocese moved its seat to Modruš, which was then owned by the Frankopan family. Subsequently, it was moved even further, to Novi Vinodolski by 1493. In his flight from the Ottomans, then bishop of Modruš Krištofor took along the golden cross which was once owned by the original bishop of Krbava, Matej. This cross is today stored in the church of Saints Philip and James, in village of Bribir, near Novi Vinodolski.

The continuous Ottoman incursions and conquests led to the depopulation and destruction of catholic churches in the area. This was followed by the arrival of new population which practiced different religions. As the time passed, the Krbava cathedral of St. James Senior became buried underground.

During the course of Croatian War of Independence, the area of Udbina was occupied by the rebelled Serbs. In 1994, they dug out two large trenches for their MLRS systems on top of the cathedral remains. While doing this, they damaged many nearby graves and parts of the cathedral. In spite of the damage caused to the site, this later helped Croatian archeologists to begin with the research, in the aftermath of the Operation Storm.

== Description ==
The 36 x 12 m layout of the one-nave Krbava cathedral fits central-European sacral architecture pattern and shows that the site also housed a local bishop. The remains of the cathedral along with bishop quarters were conserved. During the next phase of the archeological research, the archeologists are hoping to find the remains of the original cathedral of first bishop Matej (1185 – 1220.). Thus far, 227 medieval Croatian graves were found on the site, many of which were damaged by the Serbs during Croatian War of Independence. The graveyard which is right next to the church, consists of several layers. It is likely that some of the graves found there contained deceased Croatians who participated in 1493 Battle of Krbava Field. The same graves also contained ornaments, coins, spurs and other items which could be dated between 14th and 15th century.
