= Lika-Krbava County =

Historic county of the Kingdom of Croatia-Slavonia

Lika-Krbava County Ličko-krbavska županija Lika-Korbava vármegye
- County of the Kingdom of Croatia-Slavonia
- 1881–1920
- Coat of arms

- Location of the County (red) within the Kingdom of Croatia-Slavonia (white)
- Capital: Gospić
- Area
  - Coordinates: 44°33′N 15°22′E
  - 1910: 6,211 km^{2} (2,398 sq mi)
- Population
  - 1910: 204,710
- History
  - Established: 15 July 1881
  - Treaty of Trianon: 4 June 1920
Preceded by	Succeeded by
Croatian Military Frontier	Karlovac Oblast
- Today part of: Croatia

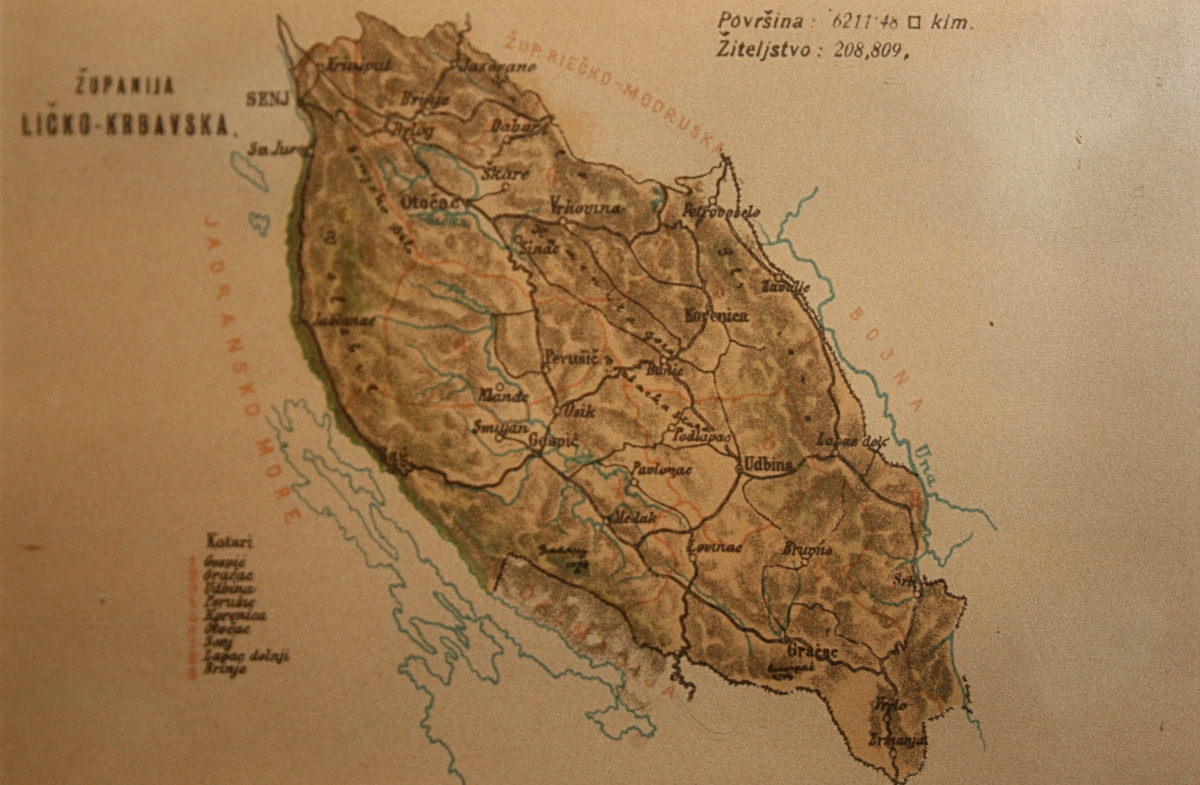
Old map of Lika-Krbava County

Lika-Krbava County (Croatian: Ličko-krbavska županija; Serbian: Личко-крбавска жупанија; Hungarian: Lika-Korbava vármegye) was a historic administrative subdivision of the Kingdom of Croatia-Slavonia. Croatia-Slavonia was an autonomous kingdom within the Lands of the Crown of Saint Stephen, the Hungarian part of the dual Austro-Hungarian Empire. Its territory is now in southwestern Croatia. Lika and Krbava are the names of two valleys in the county (Gospić lies in Lika). The capital of the county was Gospić (Croatian, in Hungarian: Goszpics).

== Geography ==
Lika-Krbava county shared borders with the Austrian Kingdom of Dalmatia and Bosnia-Herzegovina and the county of Modruš-Rijeka (also in Croatia-Slavonia). The county has a strip of Adriatic Sea coast. Its area was 6211 km^{2} around 1910.

== History ==
The territory of the Lika-Krbava County was part of the Kingdom of Croatia when it entered a personal union with the Kingdom of Hungary in 1102, and with it became part of the Habsburg monarchy in 1526. In 1920, by the Treaty of Trianon the county became part of the newly formed Kingdom of Serbs, Croats and Slovenes (later renamed to Yugoslavia). Since 1991, when Croatia became independent from Yugoslavia, the county is part of Croatia.

== Demographics ==
In 1900, the county had a population of 209,341 people and was composed of the following linguistic communities:

Total:

- Serbian: 107,172 (51.2%)
- Croatian: 101,737 (48.6%)
- German: 134 (0.0%)
- Hungarian: 60 (0.0%)
- Slovak: 10 (0.0%)
- Romanian: 1 (0.0%)
- Ruthenian: 0 (0.0%)
- Other or unknown: 227 (0.1%)

According to the census of 1900, the county was composed of the following religious communities:

Total:

- Serbian Orthodox: 107,176 (51.2%)
- Roman Catholic: 102,123 (48.8%)
- Lutheran: 16 (0.0%)
- Calvinist: 11 (0.0%)
- Greek Catholic: 7 (0.0%)
- Jewish: 7 (0.0%)
- Unitarian: 0 (0.0%)
- Other or unknown: 1 (0.0%)

In 1910, the county had a population of 204,710 people and was composed of the following linguistic communities:

Total:

- Serbian: 104,036 (50.82%)
- Croatian: 100,346 (49.02%)
- German: 68 (0.03%)
- Hungarian: 22 (0.01%)
- Slovak: 3 (0.0%)
- Romanian: 2 (0.0%)
- Ruthenian: 2 (0.0%)
- Other or unknown: 231 (0.11%)

According to the census of 1910, the county was composed of the following religious communities:

Total:

- Serbian Orthodox: 104,041 (50.82%)
- Roman Catholic: 100,620 (49.15%)
- Lutheran: 6 (0.0%)
- Calvinist: 2 (0.0%)
- Greek Catholic: 14 (0.0%)
- Jewish: 12 (0.0%)
- Unitarian: 0 (0.0%)
- Other or unknown: 15 (0.0%)

== Subdivisions ==
In the early 20th century, the subdivisions of Lika-Krbava County were:

Districts
District	Capital
Donji Lapac	Donji Lapac
Brinje	Brinje
Gospić	Gospić
Gračac	Gračac
Korenica	Korenica
Otočac	Otočac
Perušić	Perušić
Udbina	Udbina
Senj	Senj
Urban districts
Senj

== See also ==
- Lika-Senj County of Croatia
