= Municipality of Makole =

Municipality of Slovenia

Municipality of Makole Občina Makole
- Municipality
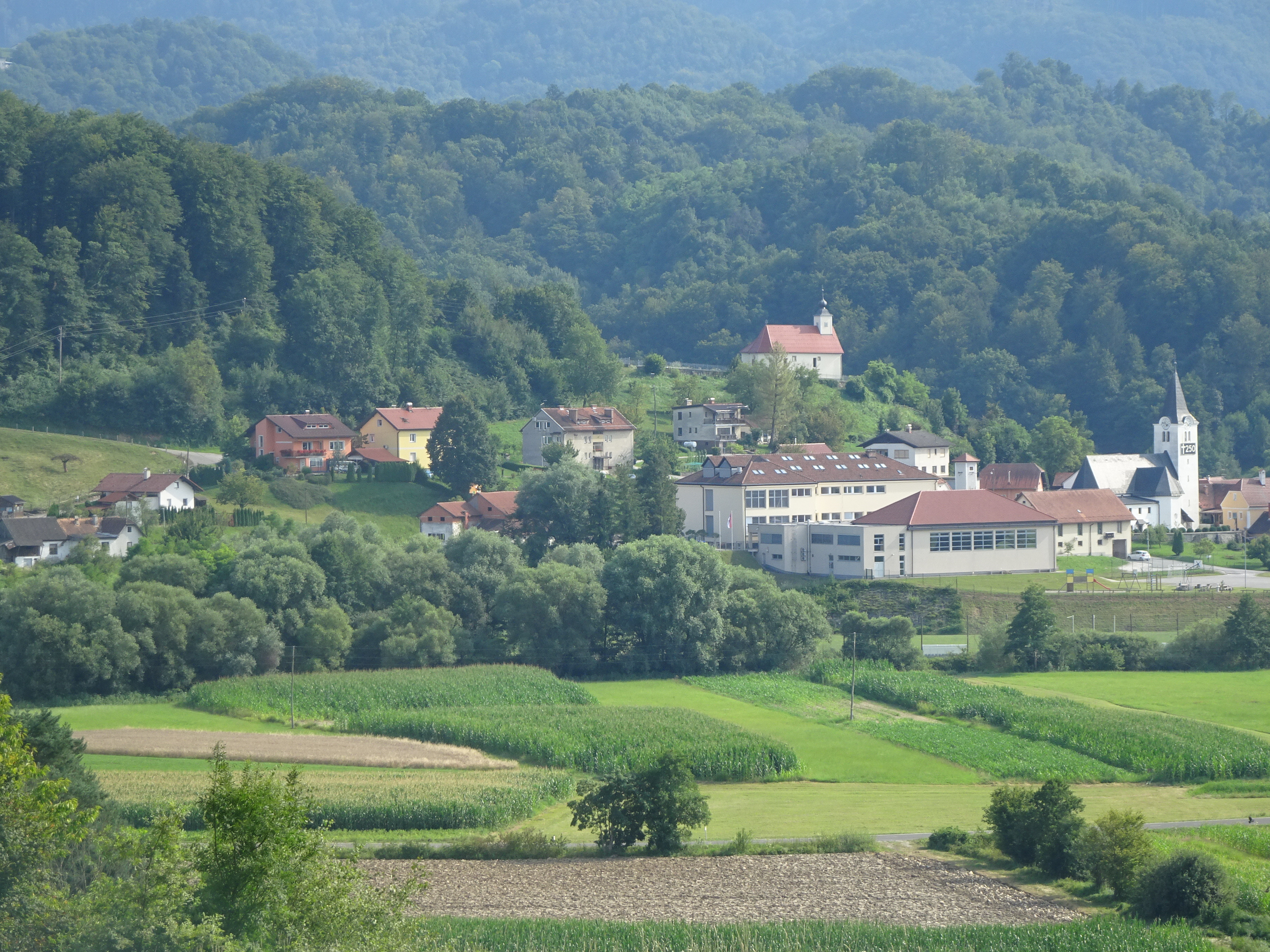

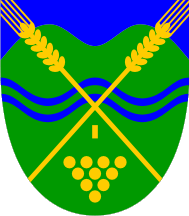
- Coat of arms

- Location of the Municipality of Makole in Slovenia
- Coordinates: 46°19′N 15°40′E
- Country: Slovenia

Government
  - Mayor: Franc Majcen (Independent)

Area
  - Total: 36.9 km^{2} (14.2 sq mi)

Population (2018)
  - Total: 2,013
  - Density: 54.6/km^{2} (141/sq mi)
- Time zone: UTC+01 (CET)
  - Summer (DST): UTC+02 (CEST)
- Website: www.obcina-makole.si

The Municipality of Makole (pronounced [ˈmaːkɔlɛ]; Slovene: Občina Makole) is a municipality in the traditional region of Styria in northeastern Slovenia. The seat of the municipality is the town of Makole. Makole became a municipality in 2006.

Makole and the neighboring municipalities in the region

== Geography ==
It is located in the Dravinja Valley on the western edge of Haloze at the end of Jelovec Creek (Slovene: Jelovški potok). The municipality is on the border between the Drava Valley and Celje region. It also borders the municipalities of Rogaška Slatina and Majšperk.

== Tourism ==
Today, Makole is a municipality with tourist attractions and with opportunities for development and a rich cultural and natural heritage, including Štatenberg mansion, numerous springs, karst caves, and vineyards. Tourism is developing and growing in the municipality. Recently, recreational activity has flourished. There are also hunting and fishing tourism, and horseback riding.

== Settlements ==
In addition to the municipal seat of Makole, the municipality also includes the following settlements:

- Dežno pri Makolah
- Jelovec pri Makolah
- Ložnica
- Mostečno
- Pečke
- Savinsko
- Stari Grad
- Štatenberg
- Stopno
- Stranske Makole
- Strug
- Varoš
