= Ložnica, Makole =

Ložnica
- Location in Slovenia
- Coordinates: 46°18′56.79″N 15°41′29.68″E
- Country: Slovenia
- Traditional region: Styria
- Statistical region: Drava
- Municipality: Makole

Area
  - Total: 2.07 km^{2} (0.80 sq mi)
- Elevation: 470.7 m (1,544 ft)

Population (2002)
  - Total: 97

Ložnica (pronounced [lɔˈʒniːtsa]) is a settlement in the valley of Ložnica Creek, a tributary of the Dravinja River, in the Municipality of Makole in northeastern Slovenia. The area is part of the traditional region of Styria. It is now included with the rest of the municipality in the Drava Statistical Region.
