= Pečke =

- Location in Slovenia
- Coordinates: 46°20′4.12″N 15°40′42.37″E
- Country: Slovenia
- Traditional region: Styria
- Statistical region: Drava
- Municipality: Makole

Area
  - Total: 2.74 km^{2} (1.06 sq mi)
- Elevation: 250.1 m (821 ft)

Population (2002)
  - Total: 278

Pečke (pronounced [pɛtʃˈkeː] or [pɛtʃˈkɛ], German: Petschke) is a village in the Municipality of Makole in northeastern Slovenia. It lies in the lower valley of Ložnica Creek, just before its confluence with the Dravinja River. It includes the hamlets of Spodnje Pečke, Sredce, and Zgornje Pečke. The area is part of the traditional region of Styria. It is now included with the rest of the municipality in the Drava Statistical Region.
