= Udbina =

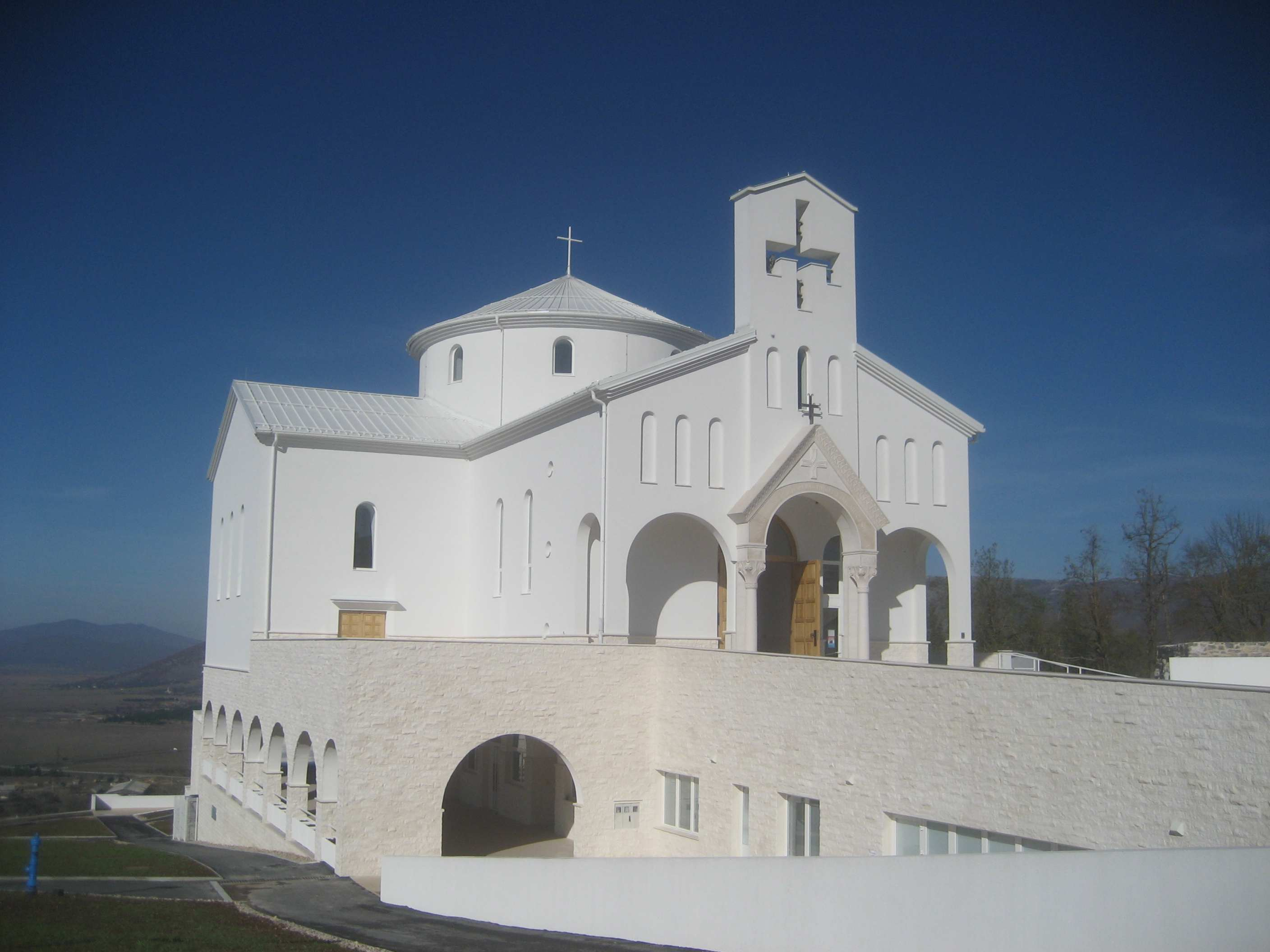
- Church of Croatian Martyrs, built in honour of those who died in the Battle of Krbava

- Flag Seal

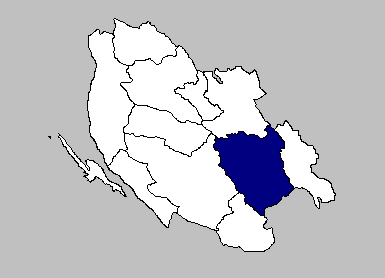
- The Udbina municipality within Lika-Senj County
- Interactive map of Udbina
- Location in Croatia
- Coordinates: 44.53132°N 15.76671°E
- Country: Croatia
- County: Lika-Senj County

Government
  - Mayor: Josip Seuček (HDZ)
  - Municipal Council: 11 members: • SDSS (4); • HDZ (3); • HSS (1); • SDP (1); • Independents (2)

Area
  - City: 685.8 km^{2} (264.8 sq mi)
  - Urban: 18.8 km^{2} (7.3 sq mi)

Population (2021)
  - City: 1,334
  - Density: 1.945/km^{2} (5.038/sq mi)
  - Urban: 738
  - Urban density: 39.3/km^{2} (102/sq mi)
- Time zone: UTC+1 (CET)
- Postal code: 53234 Udbina
- Website: udbina.hr

Udbina is a settlement and a municipality in historical Krbava, in the Lika region of Croatia. Administratively, it is part of the Lika-Senj County.

== Geography ==
Udbina is located in the large karst field called Krbava. It is approximately 45 kilometres from Gospić, the county capital and nearest sizeable town. The field has a small airport, the only one in Lika.

== Climate ==
Between 1996 and 2015, the highest temperature recorded at the local weather station was 36.6 °C (97.9 °F), on 3 August 1988. The coldest temperature was −18.3 °C (−0.9 °F), on 13 January 2003.

== History ==
Udbina was one of Illyrian territories. In the medieval Kingdom of Croatia, Udbina was known as Civitas Corbaviae (Town of Krbava) and was the seat of a Diocese of Corbavia from 1185, when it was separated from the Archdiocese of Split, until 1460, when the diocese seat moved to the Krbava's former canonical territory of Modruš due to Ottoman military campaigns in the area. The Bishop's Court was built during Bishop Bonifacio in the 14th century. In the Middle Ages, Udbina was a seat (Latin: castrum) of the historic Krbava County. The name Udbina was mentioned for the first time in 1493, following the Battle of Krbava Field in which the Croats under ban Emerik Derenčin and the Frankopans suffered defeat from the Ottoman Empire.

The medieval fortified town, from which only the remains were preserved, was governed in 1509 by Ban Ivan Karlović and between 1527 and 1689 by the Turks as part of the Eyalet of Bosnia.The 1712 census of Lika and Krbava records that 44 Croatian, 6 Bunjevci and 20 Vlach families live in Udbina. Ancient tombstones were discovered near the remains of the Church of St. Mark Graveyard (Named after the folk tradition that martyr saint and several heroes of the Battle of Krbava were buried on the site), which was a shrine with a triangular ending destroyed by the Serbs in 1942. In the vicinity, near Mutilić, there are ruins of the old Church of St. Augustine (quadrangular sanctuary with a bell tower).

In the late 19th and early 20th century, Udbina was part of the Lika-Krbava County of the Kingdom of Croatia-Slavonia. According to the 1910 census, the town of Udbina was inhabited by a Croat majority and Serb minority; 1,317 Croats and 621 Serbs.

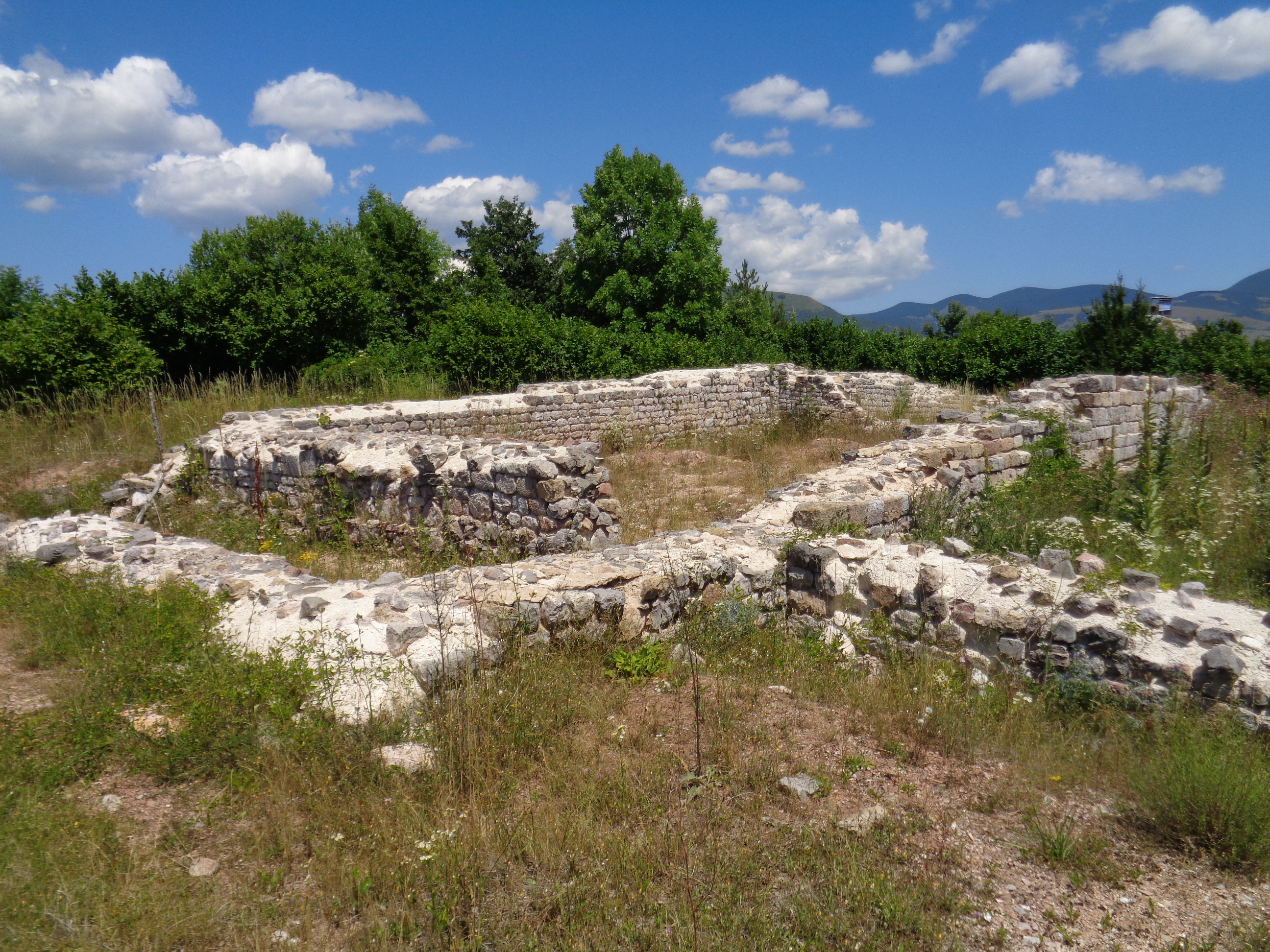
Ruins of the former Corbavian Cathedral of St. James in Udbina

The government of the Kingdom of Yugoslavia erected in Udbina a monument to the King Alexander I which was removed after the establishment of the Independent State of Croatia (NDH). During World War II, Udbina was part of NDH's territory. Local gendarmerie sergeant Drakulić gave 200 rifles to the local Serbs, which on 12 April 1941 began with an ethnic cleansing of Lika from Gračac to Gospić. On 13 July 1941, Catholic priest Father Mate Mugoša delivered a sermon to his parishioners in Udbina pledging allegiance to the Ustaše and calling for the extermination of Serb population in Croatia, which preceded massacres of Serbs. In 1942, Serbs burned two Catholic churches, Church of St. Nicholas and Church of St. Mark Graveyard. In December of the same year, the Croatian population was expelled from Udbina. In order to conceal ruins, Serbs after the war built a hotel on the site of the Church of St. Nicholas, and used stone from the Church of St. Mark Graveyard for building a sheep barn. In addition, Serbs also destroyed the Church of St. Augustin in Mutilić and the Catholic cemetery in Korija. During the war, many local Serbs were killed by Ustaše and local Croats by Chetniks and Yugoslav Partisans. The Orthodox Church of St. Nicholas (filial of the Church of the Holy Transfiguration of Mutilić) was also destroyed during World War II. Most Croats fled from Udbina after the massacre on the eve before the St. Lucy's Day. Croats fled through Trovro mountain all the way to Lovinac.

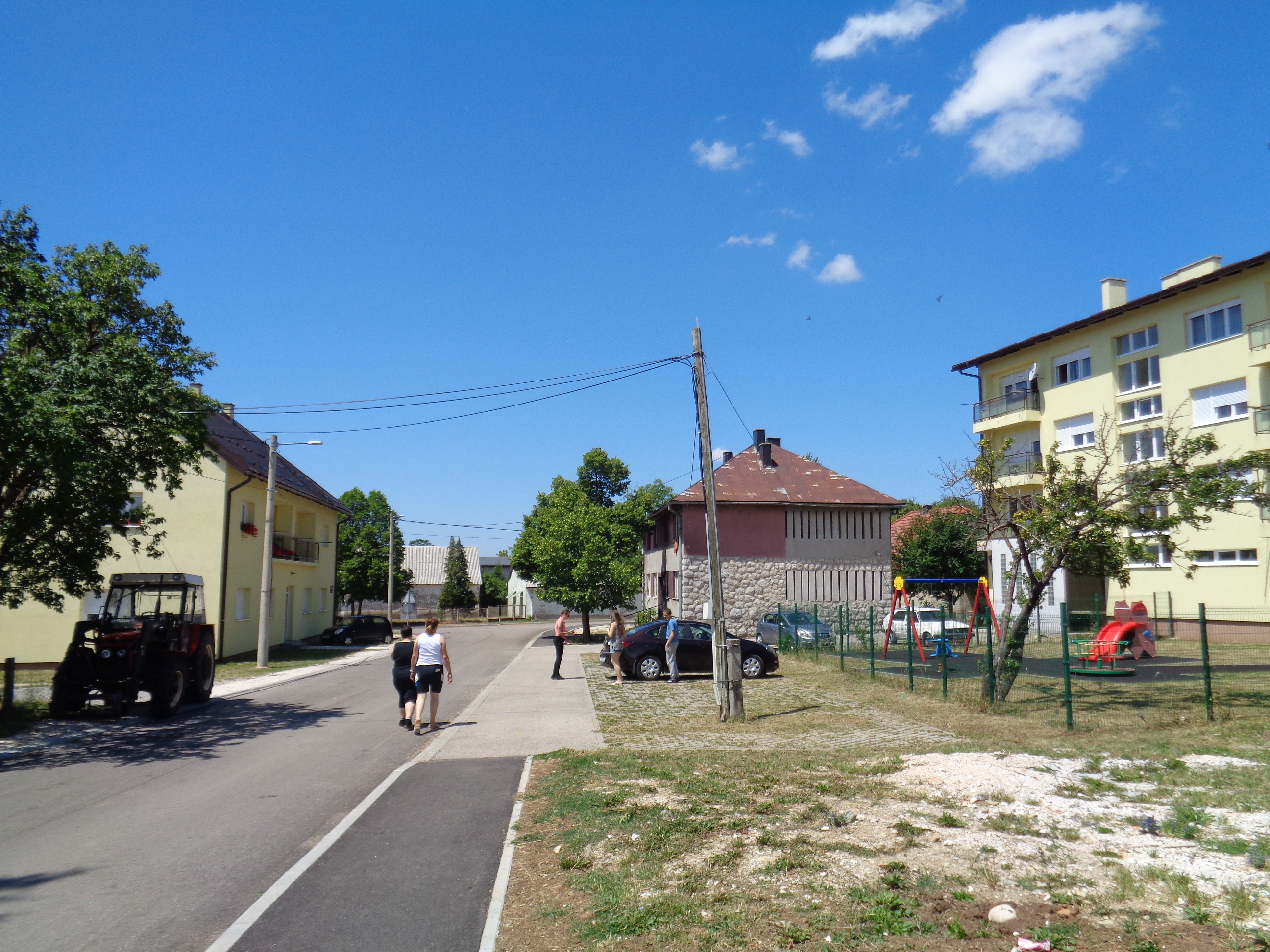
Buildings and streets in Udbina

After World War II, the new Yugoslav authority took away the houses and lands from the Croats and gave them to Serbs who comprised Udbina's majority, as confirmed by 1961–91 censuses, with smaller numbers of Croats and Muslims. It seems that there was a Franciscan monastery of St. John on the "Udbina hill". Yugoslav authorities erected a monument to the Yugoslav Partisans on the site without doing any archeological research or getting approval from the Institute for the Protection of Cultural Monuments. During the construction of the Partisan monument, remains of medieval edifices and human bones were found on the site. In SFR Yugoslavia, Udbina was part of the Korenica municipality.

During the Croatian War of Independence, Udbina was under control of the Republic of Serbian Krajina. During that time, the remaining Croats from Krbava were forced to leave. The only remaining Croatian settlement on Krbava, Podlapač was saved from the Serb militias by the UNPROFOR's Czech battalion. The local airport was used as an airbase for offensive operations against Croatia and Bosnia and Herzegovina, in direct defiance of NATO's Operation Deny Flight. The airstrip was eventually destroyed by a NATO's 39 aircraft-strong strike on 21 November 1994. Udbina was taken over by Croatian forces on 7 August 1995, during Operation Storm.

In the 2001 census, 51% of Udbina's population were Croats, mostly from Bosnia. Today, Udbina is a part of the Lika-Senj County. In recent years, Udbina recorded an increase in tourist visits.

== Demographics ==
In 2021, the municipality had 1,334 residents in the following 26 settlements:

- Breštani, population 13
- Bunić, population 96
- Čojluk, population 3
- Debelo Brdo, population 47
- Donji Mekinjar, population 15
- Frkašić, population 21
- Grabušić, population 49
- Jagodnje, population 21
- Jošani, population 38
- Klašnjica, population 1
- Komić, population 14
- Krbava, population 35
- Kurjak, population 15
- Mutilić, population 36
- Ondić, population 25
- Pećane, population 21
- Podlapača, population 55
- Poljice, population 9
- Rebić, population 11
- Srednja Gora, population 9
- Svračkovo Selo, population 9
- Šalamunić, population 24
- Tolić, population 2
- Udbina, population 738
- Vedašić, population 2
- Visuć, population 25
Udbina: Population trends 1857–2021
v

population	17016	18310	15766	19101	20755	18706	18871	16971	9629	9644	9070	7108	5318	4628	1649	1874	1334
	1857	1869	1880	1890	1900	1910	1921	1931	1948	1953	1961	1971	1981	1991	2001	2011	2021

Sources: Croatian Bureau of Statistics publications

According to the 2011 census, there were 1,875 residents in the municipality, of which 51% were Serbs and 45% were Croats.

== Historic sites ==
- Udbina Castle
- Cathedral of St. James Senior in Krbava

== Politics ==
In 2016, on the instructions of Vlaho Orepić, Minister of Interior in the Cabinet of Tihomir Orešković, Croatian police started intensive patrols and checking out the residence of local population and that resulted in 71 deletions from the residence register. Voices of criticism of police action were raised, including that of the Deputy Mayor of Udbina, Milan Uzelac, claiming that the action is disproportionately and primarily targeted at the Serbs of Croatia and promoted by a president of a local right wing organization close to the ruling Bridge of Independent Lists. Representatives of local Serb population organized a meeting with Serb National Council to discuss the issue. 2011 census was the first post-war census at which Serbs of Croatia, many of whom left the area during the Operation Storm, constituted the majority of local population. Minister Vlaho Orepić in his statements prior to Police activities in Udbina and the rest of the country called out the Serb minority for election manipulation with the fictive residences.

=== Minority councils and representatives ===
Serbian and Croatian are co-official at the municipal level in Udbina. As of 2023, most of the legal requirements for the fulfillment of bilingual standards have not been carried out. Official buildings do have Cyrillic signage, but not street signs, traffic signs or seals. Cyrillic is not used on any official documents, nor are there public legal and administrative employees proficient in the script. Preserving traditional Serbian place names and assigning street names to Serbian historical figures is legally mandated, but not carried out. Almost uniquely among all municipalities in Croatia where it is mandated (along with the Slovaks of Punitovci), neither minority national symbols nor holidays are officially celebrated, in spite of the fact that 43% of local government employees were Serbs.

Directly elected minority councils and representatives are tasked with consulting tasks for the local or regional authorities in which they are advocating for minority rights and interests, integration into public life and participation in the management of local affairs. At the 2023 Croatian national minorities councils and representatives elections Serbs of Croatia fulfilled legal requirements to elect 10 members minority council of the Municipality of Udbina.

== Notable locals ==
- Rade Šerbedžija (born 1946), actor, born in Bunić
- Tomislav Sertić (1902–1945), Ustasha General, born in Udbina
- Petar Smiljanić - leader of a Morlach clan, born in Udbina
- Jovanka Broz (1924–2013), wife of Yugoslav president Josip Broz Tito, born in Pećane
- Vojislav Korać, born in Debelo Brdo.
