= Dežno pri Makolah =

- Location in Slovenia
- Coordinates: 46°18′56.79″N 15°41′29.68″E
- Country: Slovenia
- Traditional region: Styria
- Statistical region: Drava
- Municipality: Makole

Area
  - Total: 6.08 km^{2} (2.35 sq mi)
- Elevation: 470.7 m (1,544 ft)

Population (2002)
  - Total: 97

Dežno pri Makolah (pronounced [ˈdeːʒnɔ pɾi ˈmaːkɔlax], German: Döschno) is a settlement in the Municipality of Makole in northeastern Slovenia. It lies in the hills above the right bank of the Dravinja River. The area is part of the traditional region of Styria. It is now included with the rest of the municipality in the Drava Statistical Region.

== Name ==
The settlement was recorded in written sources in 1220–30 as in Bratyssen, in Radgassen, and in Dragozla (and in 1265–67 as in Deschen). The name is probably derived from the common noun deža 'squat round vessel', also used in the metaphorical sense 'hollow carved by water'. The name of the settlement was changed from Dežno to Dežno pri Makolah (literally, 'Dežno near Makole') in 1953.
