= Jelovec pri Makolah =

- Location in Slovenia
- Coordinates: 46°18′25.13″N 15°40′22.44″E
- Country: Slovenia
- Traditional region: Styria
- Statistical region: Drava
- Municipality: Makole

Area
  - Total: 3.5 km^{2} (1.4 sq mi)
- Elevation: 265.6 m (871 ft)

Population (2002)
  - Total: 188

Jelovec pri Makolah (pronounced [jɛˈlɔːʋəts pɾi ˈmaːkɔlax] or [jɛˈloːʋəts pɾi ˈmaːkɔlax], in older sources Jelovci, German: Jellowetz) is a settlement in the Municipality of Makole in northeastern Slovenia. It lies in the valley and surrounding hills of a small right tributary of the Dravinja River. The area is part of the traditional region of Styria. It is now included with the rest of the municipality in the Drava Statistical Region.
