= Kensington House =

Kensington House may refer to the following places in London:

- Kensington House, an early name for Kensington Palace
- Kensington House, the home of Cecil Thomas (sculptor), later renamed Dora House
- Kensington House (academy), a residence for Sir Thomas Colby, academy, boarding house, and private asylum
