= Savinsko =

- Location in Slovenia
- Coordinates: 46°20′44.82″N 15°41′54.43″E
- Country: Slovenia
- Traditional region: Styria
- Statistical region: Drava
- Municipality: Makole

Area
  - Total: 1.31 km^{2} (0.51 sq mi)
- Elevation: 303.6 m (996 ft)

Population (2002)
  - Total: 81

Savinsko (pronounced [saˈʋiːnskɔ], German: Sawinsko) is a small settlement in the Municipality of Makole in northeastern Slovenia. It lies in the hills above the left bank of the Dravinja River. The area is part of the traditional region of Styria. It is now included with the rest of the municipality in the Drava Statistical Region.
