= Štatenberg =

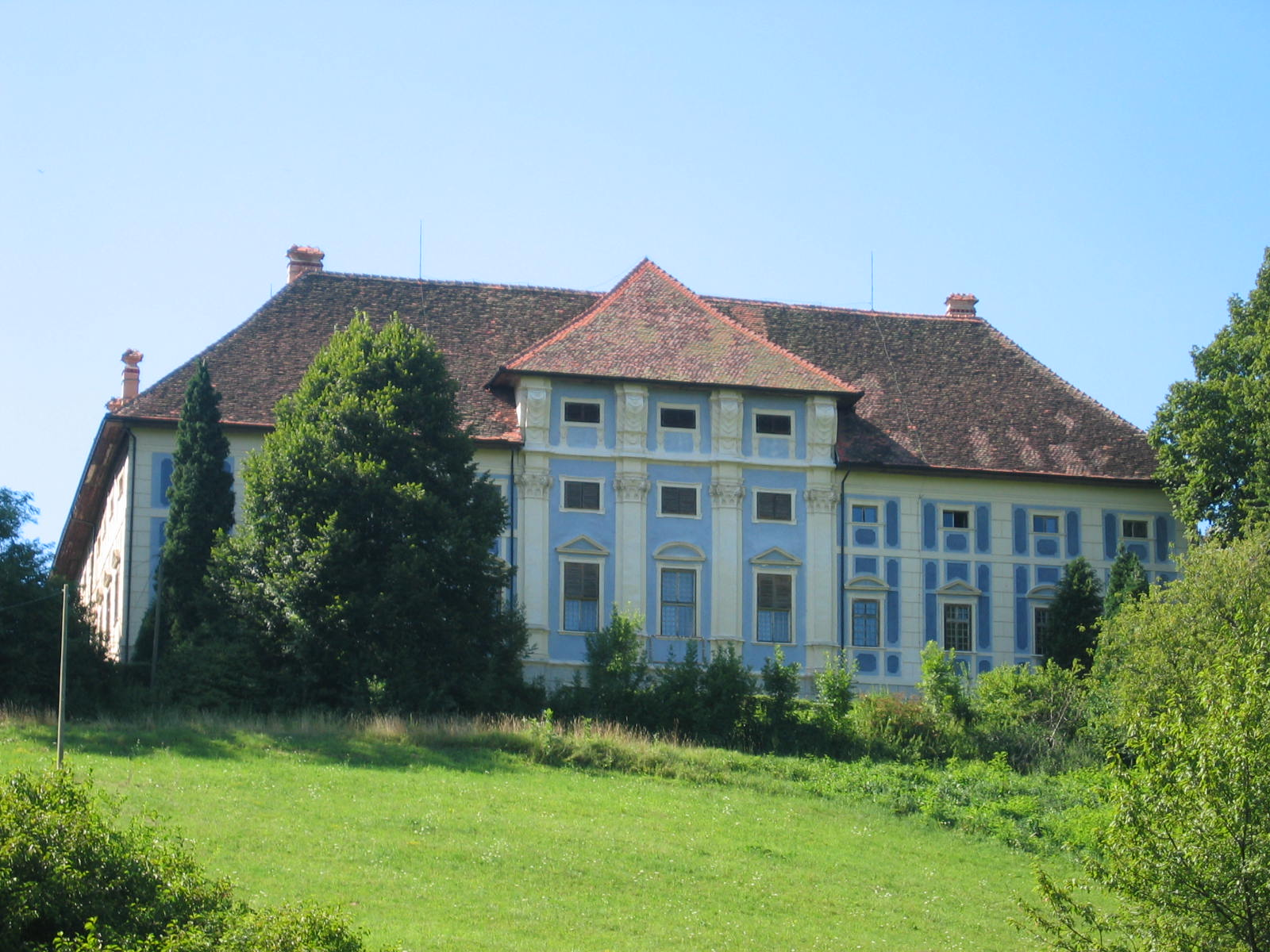
- Štatenberg Mansion

- Location in Slovenia
- Coordinates: 46°19′36″N 15°38′40.46″E
- Country: Slovenia
- Traditional region: Styria
- Statistical region: Drava
- Municipality: Makole

Area
  - Total: 3.51 km^{2} (1.36 sq mi)
- Elevation: 333 m (1,093 ft)

Population (2002)
  - Total: 172

Štatenberg (pronounced [ˈʃtaːtəmbɛɾk], German: Stattenberg) is a settlement in the Municipality of Makole in northeastern Slovenia. It lies in the hills above the left bank of the Dravinja River. The area is part of the traditional region of Styria. It is now included with the rest of the municipality in the Drava Statistical Region.

It gets its name from Štatenberg Mansion, built in the late 17th century by the Counts of Attems east of the settlement.

Prior to World War II, the mansion was the property of the Neumann family of Zagreb.
