= Krbava =

Historical region of Croatia Proper

- Location within Croatia
- Floor elevation: 626 to 740 m (2,054 to 2,428 ft)
- Area: 67 km^{2} (26 mi^{2})

Geography
- Country: Croatia
- State/Province: Lika-Senj County
- Coordinates: 44.6°N 15.7°E
- Mountain range: Dinaric Alps
- Interactive map of Krbava

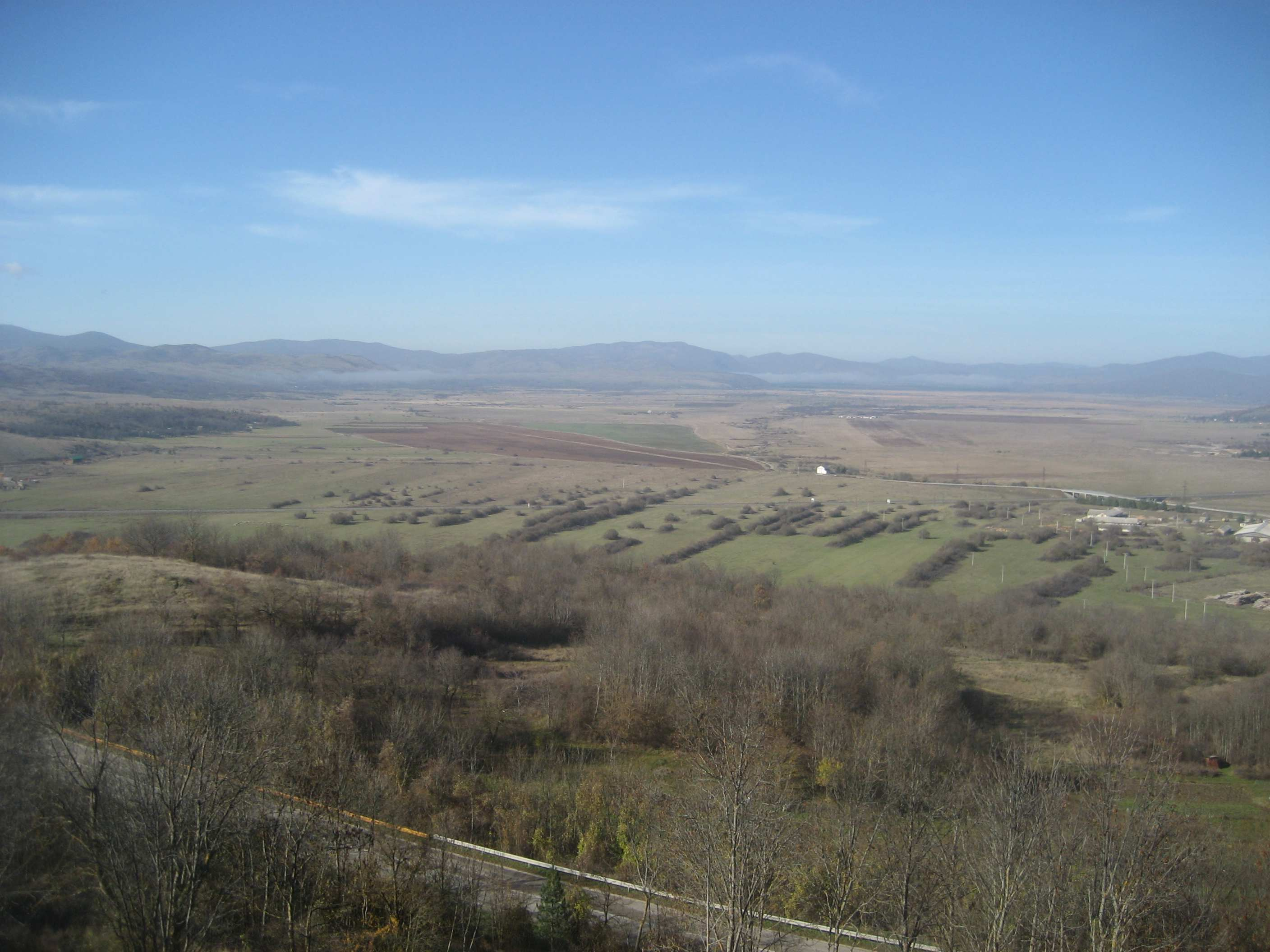
Krbava field

Krbava (pronounced [kř̩bav̞a]; Latin: Corbavia) is a historical region located in Mountainous Croatia and a former Catholic bishopric (1185–1460), precursor of the diocese of Modruš and present Latin titular see.

It can be considered either located east of Lika, or indeed as the eastern part of Lika. The town of Udbina is the central settlement of the Krbava karst field, the Krbavsko Polje.

== History ==
=== Overview ===
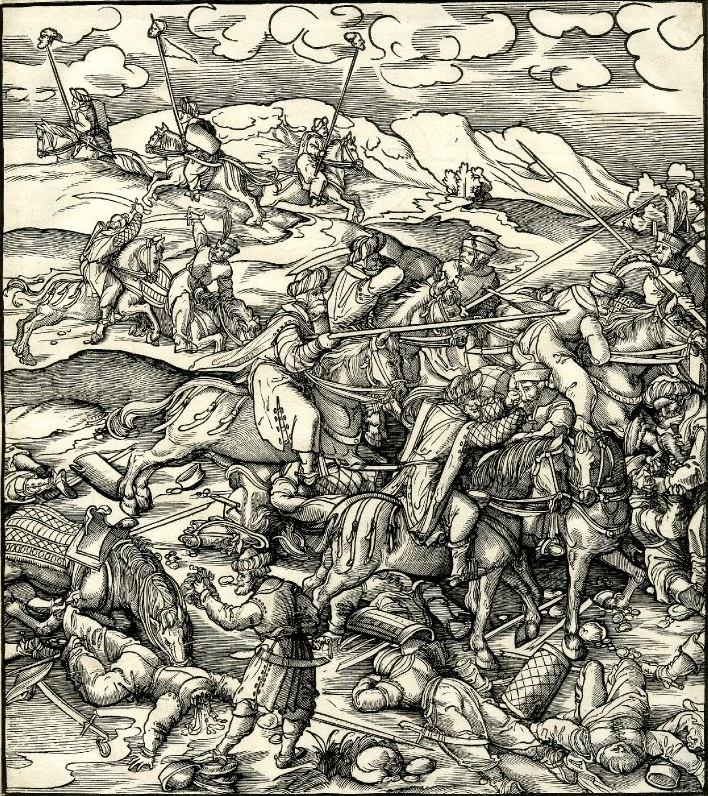
Battle of Krbava field by Leonhard Beck (ca. 1514)

Krbava was one of twelve medieval regions that later comprised the later Lika-Krbava County. Numerous historical sources, mainly in Latin, referred to toponyms within Krbava, most of which have been correlated with modern-day toponymy.

The most important historical event in Krbava was the Battle of Krbava Field in 1493.

During Croatia in the union with Hungary, nobility were given the title "of Krbava" (de Corbauia).

=== Ecclesiastical history ===
- Its capital Udbina became the seat of a Catholic bishopric of Corbavia (Latin = Curiate Italian) / Corbavien(sis) (Latin adjective) when the council of Split (Spalato) in 1185 detached a new suffragan see from the Archdiocese of Spalato (which became its Metropolitan). It comprised the county of Corbavia, part of the county of Lika and the territories of Modruš, Novigrad and Vinodol (Novi Vinodolski, Italian Novi in Valdivino), south-east of Rijeka (Italian: Fiume). Pope Urban III approved the erection and the nomination as first bishop of Matteo with the synodal acts.
- During the 1460s, due to the Ottoman (Turkish) advance in Dalmatia, the diocese of Corbavia was formally suppressed by Pope Pius II, but its territory immediately reassigned to establish as successor see the Diocese of Modruš (Croatian = Curiate Italian) / Modrussa / Modrussen(sis) (Latin), named after its new see, near Fiume (Rijeka), at the rock fortress of the Frankopan counts (now in the comune Josipdol). Again it was a suffragan of the Metropolitan Archdiocese of Spalato (Split).

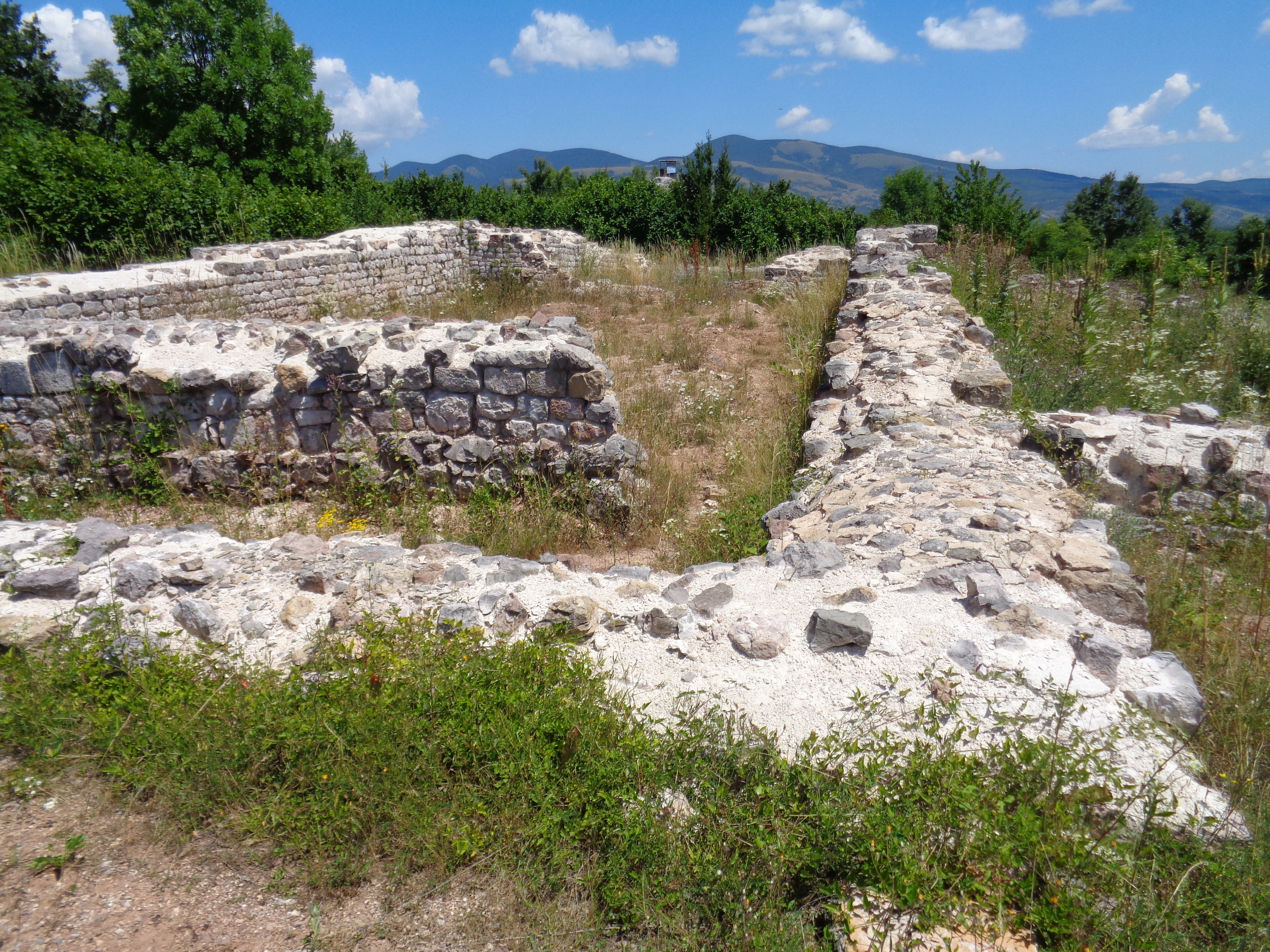
Ruins of the former Corbavian Cathedral of St. James in Udbina

Suffragan Bishops of Corbavia (Krbava), at Udbina
all Roman Rite; possibly incomplete

- Matteo (1185 - death 1220)
- Martino (mentioned circa 1224)
- Saraceno (in 1240)
- Pietro (1300? – ?)
- Bonifacio, Friars Minor (O.F.M.) (1332.06.03 – ?)
- Radoslav, O.F.M. (1341? – ?)
- Lupo (1349.02.07 – ?)
- Mauro (1351.03.23 – ?)
- Pietro Colda, Dominican Order (O.P.) (1361.02.15 – death 1375?)
- Tommaso Nicolai (1375.11.14 – ?)
- Miklós (1386? – 1401.04.20), next Bishop of Vác (Hungary) (1401.04.20 – 1405)
- Stefano da Fermo, Augustinians (O.E.S.A.) (1401.08.27 – 1406.02.01), next Bishop of Karpathus (Italian Scarpanto; insular Greece) (1406.02.01 – ?)
- Stefano Doimo de Blasi (1406.02.01 – 1408.10.15), next Bishop of Karpathus (insular Greece) (1408.10.15 – ?)
- Gimignano Useppi da San Gimignano (1408.10.15 – death ?)
- Petar Zoch (1418.10.07 – ?)
- Vito Ostoir Marinich (1431.06.22 – death ?)
- Francesco, O.F.M. (1456.10.29 – ?)

==== Titular see ====
The diocese was nominally restored in 2000 as Latin Titular bishopric of Krbava (Croatian) / Corbavia (Latin = Curiate Italian) / Corbavien(sis) (Latin adjective).

It has had the following incumbents, so far not of the fitting Episcopal (lowest) but of archiepiscopal (intermediary) rank:

- Titular Archbishop Ivan Jurkovič (2001.07.28 – ...) as papal diplomat : Apostolic Nuncio (ambassador) to Belarus (2001.07.28 – 2004.04.22), Apostolic Nuncio to Ukraine (2004.04.22 – 2011.02.19), Apostolic Nuncio to Russian Federation (2011.02.19 – 2016.02.13), Apostolic Nuncio to Uzbekistan (2011.07.22 – 2016.02.13), Permanent Observer to Office of the United Nations and Specialized Institutions in Geneva (UNOG) (2016.02.13 – ...), Permanent Observer to World Trade Organization (WTO) (2016.02.13 – ...), Representative to International Organization for Migration (IOM) (2016.02.13 – ...).

== Gallery ==
Berlin missal, written in Krbava

== See also ==
- Geography of Croatia
- List of Catholic dioceses in Croatia

== Bibliography ==
Ecclesiastical history

- Pius Bonifacius Gams, Series episcoporum Ecclesiae Catholicae, Leipzig 1931, pp. 388–389, 399
- Dictionnaire d'Histoire et de Géographie ecclésiastiques, vol. XIII, 1956, coll. 805-806
- K. Draganovic, Croazia sacra, Rome 1943, pp. 197–198
- Stato della diocesi a fine Ottocento in Acta Sanctae Sedis, 9 (1876), pp. 292–293
- Konrad Eubel, Hierarchia Catholica Medii Aevi, vol. 1, p. 208; vol. 2, p. 136; vol. 3, p. 247; vol. 4, p. 309
- Pius Bonifacius Gams, Series episcoporum Ecclesiae Catholicae, Leipzig 1931, pp. 388–389, 399
- Dictionnaire d'Histoire et de Géographie ecclésiastiques, vol. XIII, 1956, coll. 805-806
- K. Draganovic, Croazia sacra, Rome 1943, pp. 197–198
- Stato della diocesi a fine Ottocento in Acta Sanctae Sedis, 9 (1876), pp. 292–293
- Konrad Eubel, Hierarchia Catholica Medii Aevi, vol. 1, p. 208; vol. 2, p. 136; vol. 3, p. 247; vol. 4, p. 309
- Draganović, Krunoslav; Bezić, Srećko [in Croatian]; Crnković, Josip; Lešnik, Rafael; Mršo, Ivan [in Croatian]; Reven, Zdravko [in Slovenian]; Weber, Hinko (1975-05-05). Opći šematizam Katoličke Crkve u Jugoslaviji 1974 [General Directory of the Catholic Church in Yugoslavia 1974] (in Serbo-Croatian). Zagreb: Hrvatsko književno društvo sv. Ćirila i Metoda.
