= Stari Grad, Makole =

Stari Grad Sveta Ana (until 1955)
- Location in Slovenia
- Coordinates: 46°17′25.99″N 15°39′58.36″E
- Country: Slovenia
- Traditional region: Styria
- Statistical region: Drava
- Municipality: Makole

Area
  - Total: 10.22 km^{2} (3.95 sq mi)
- Elevation: 463.9 m (1,522 ft)

Population (2002)
  - Total: 251

Stari Grad (pronounced [ˈstaːɾi ˈɡɾaːt], German: Sct. Anna) is a settlement in the Municipality of Makole in northeastern Slovenia. It lies in the hills above the right bank of the Dravinja River. The area is part of the traditional region of Styria. It is now included with the rest of the municipality in the Drava Statistical Region.

== Name ==
The name of the settlement was changed from Sveta Ana (literally, 'Saint Anne') to Stari Grad (literally, 'old castle') in 1955. The name was changed on the basis of the 1948 Law on Names of Settlements and Designations of Squares, Streets, and Buildings as part of efforts by Slovenia's postwar communist government to remove religious elements from toponyms. The name Stari Grad is derived from the ruins of Štatenberg Castle, first mentioned in written documents dating to 1300. It was abandoned in the 17th century, when Štatenberg Mansion was built by its owners.

== Church ==
The local church is dedicated to Saint Anne and belongs to the Parish of Makole. It was built around 1300. It was restyled in the Baroque in the 17th century.
