= Strug, Slovenia =

Strug
- Location in Slovenia
- Coordinates: 46°20′13.5″N 15°41′39.07″E
- Country: Slovenia
- Traditional region: Styria
- Statistical region: Drava
- Municipality: Makole

Area
  - Total: 1.13 km^{2} (0.44 sq mi)
- Elevation: 275 m (902 ft)

Population (2002)
  - Total: 60

Strug (pronounced [ˈstɾuːk]) is a small settlement on the left bank of the Dravinja River in the Municipality of Makole in northeastern Slovenia. The area is part of the traditional region of Styria. It is now included with the rest of the municipality in the Drava Statistical Region.

A small chapel-shrine in the settlement dates to the 19th century.
