= Varoš, Makole =

Varoš
- Location in Slovenia
- Coordinates: 46°19′43.19″N 15°41′15.77″E
- Country: Slovenia
- Traditional region: Styria
- Statistical region: Drava
- Municipality: Makole

Area
  - Total: 1.12 km^{2} (0.43 sq mi)
- Elevation: 273.8 m (898 ft)

Population (2002)
  - Total: 90

Varoš (pronounced [ˈʋaːɾɔʃ], German: Warosch) is a settlement on the right bank of the Dravinja River in the Municipality of Makole in northeastern Slovenia. The area is part of the traditional region of Styria. It is now included with the rest of the municipality in the Drava Statistical Region.

== Name ==
Varoš was attested in historical records as Warissen in 1220–30 and Waressendorf in 1271. Locally, the village is also known as Varož and Varška vas. The name comes from the Slovene common noun varoš 'town', which was borrowed from Hungarian város 'town' (from Hungarian vár 'castle').
