= Stari Grad, Kragujevac =

Coordinates: 44°0′51″N 20°54′42″E

Stara Grad Стари Град Stara Varoš Стара Варош
- City municipality
- Interactive map of Stara Grad
- Country: Serbia
- Region: Šumadija and Western Serbia
- District: Šumadija
- Municipality: Kragujevac
- Founded: 31 May 2002
- Dissolved: 4 March 2008
- Settlements: 10

Area
  - Municipality: 16 km^{2} (6.2 sq mi)

Population (2002 census)
  - Municipality: 62,794
- Time zone: UTC+1 (CET)
  - Summer (DST): UTC+2 (CEST)
- Postal code: 34000
- Area code: +381(0)34
- Car plates: KG

Stari Grad (Serbian Cyrillic: Стари Град) or Stara Varoš (Serbian Cyrillic: Стара Варош), was one of five city municipalities which constituted the City of Kragujevac. It was the central city municipality and the most populous. The municipality was formed in May 2002, only to be dissolved in March 2008.

== Subdivisions ==
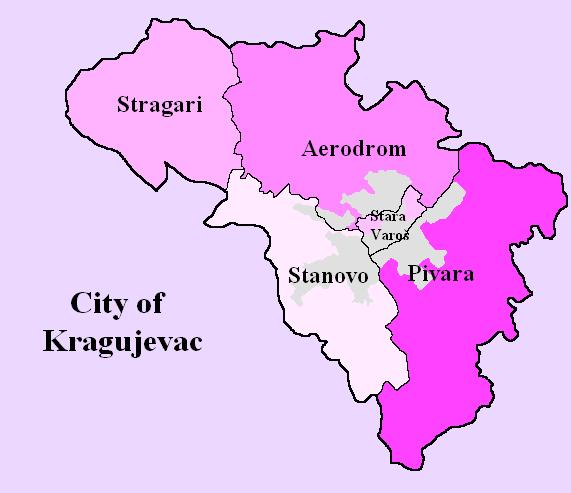
Map of the city municipalities which constituted the city of Kragujevac

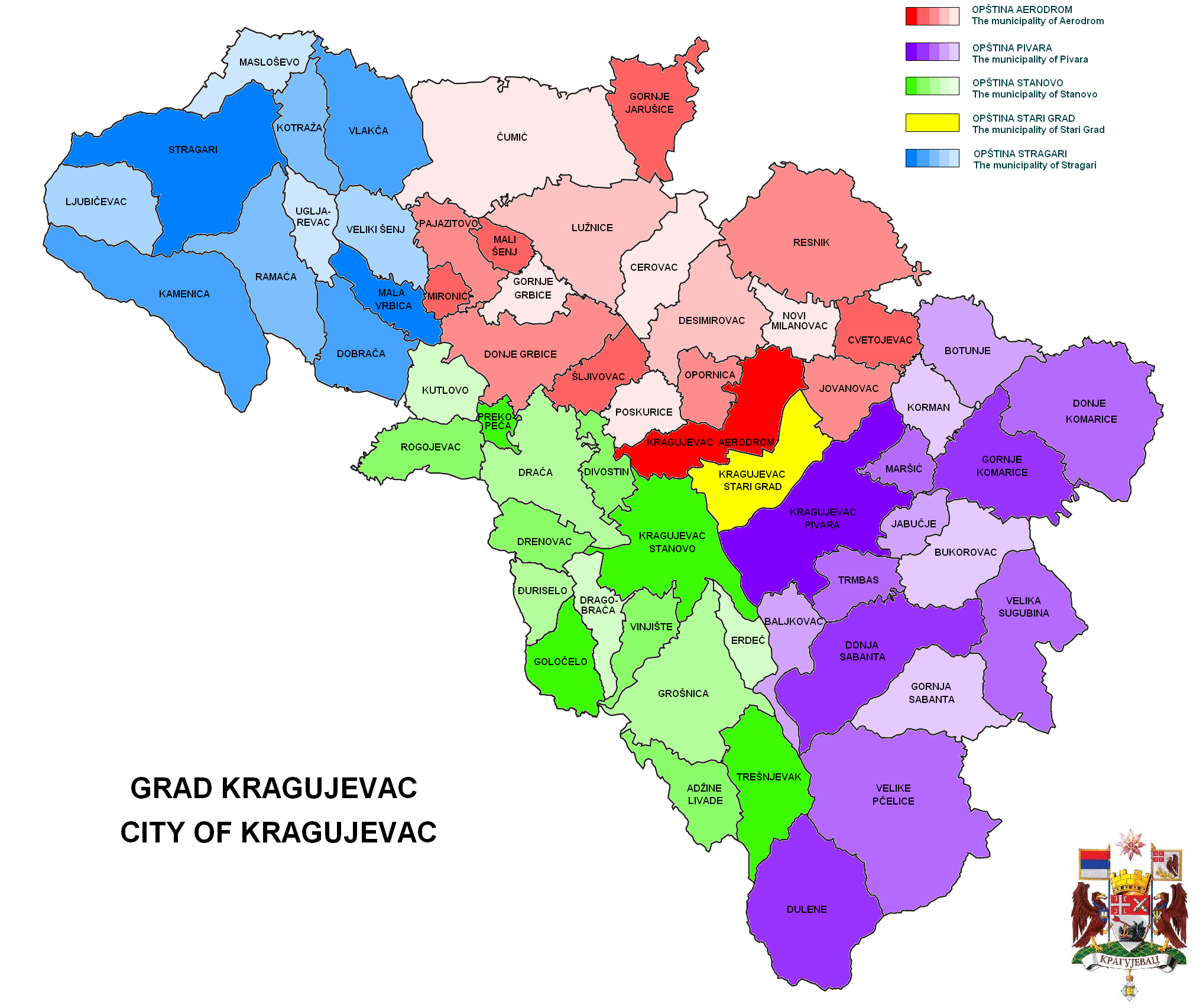
Map of the city municipalities with settlements

The Municipality of Stari Grad comprised 10 neighbourhoods:

- Aerodrom
- Bagremar
- 21. Oktobar
- Stara Radnička Kolonija
- 1 May
- Bubanj
- Sušica
- Vašarište
- City Center
- Palilula
- Erdoglija
