= Frankopan family tree =

Family tree of Croatian noble family

This is the family tree of the House of Frankopan (Counts of Krk, Senj and Modruš), a Croatian noble family, from 1115 to 1671.

Legend
Pink	Founder	Purple	Ban (Viceroy) of Croatia

Dujam I, knez Krčki (Doimus I, Conte of Krk), (floruit 1115 – †1163)
Bartol (Bartul) I Krčki (*? – †1198)	Vid (Gvido) I Krčki (*? – †1193)	Bartol II Krčki, (2.marriage), owner of Modruš since 1193
Vid II Krčki (fl. 1198–1232)	Henrik I Krčki (fl. 1198–1232)	Ivan I Krčki (fl. 1198–1232), owner of Modruš and Vinodol (s. 1225)	Martin I Krčki (fl. 1198–1232), priest
Ivan II K. (*? – †after 1241)	Bartol III K. (fl. 1240–1260)	Fridrik I K. (fl. 1241–1260)	Vid III K. (*? – †after 1231)
Škinela (Schinella) I K. (*? – †c. 1261)	Fridrik II K. (fl. 1241–1260; †after 1288)	Bartol IV K. (*? – †after 1261/70)	Vid IV K. (fl. 1241–1270), owner of Senj since 1271
Petar I K. (fl. 1261–1283)	Škinela II K. (†after 1261)	Bartol V K. (fl. 1261–1281)	Dujam II K. (fl. 1279–1317), owner of Modruš	Ivan III K. (fl. 1266–1290)	Leonard I K. (*? – †1308), owner of Vinodol
Marko I K. (*? – †1317)	Škinela III K. (fl. 1307–1314)	Nikola I K. (fl. 1307–1335; †after 1339)	Fridrik III K. (fl. 1306–1333) owner of Slunj and Drežnik	Bartol VI K. (fl. 1290–1310)	Vid V K. (*? – †after 1331)	Fridrik IV K. (*? – †after 1310)	Ivan IV K. (*? – †after 1310)
Bartol VII K. (fl. 1330–1343; †after 1385)	Nikola II K. (fl. 1335–1366; †after 1386)	Rigus I K. (*? – †after 1343)	Nikola III K. (fl. 1343–1377)	Marko II K.	Bartol VIII K. (fl. 1327–1361)	Dujam III K. (fl. 1323–1349), Zhupan (iupanus, count) of Požega	Elizabeta; Šubić, princess of Bribir, daughter of Mladen II, Ban of Croatia
Marko III K. (*? – †1384)	Stjepan II Krčki (fl. 1359 – †c. 1390), owner of Modruš	Margareta (fl. 1353 – †before 1390)	a daughter (fl. 1361–1390)	Ivan V (Anž) Krčki (*before 1343 – †1393), Ban (viceroy) of Croatia (1391–1393)	Ana of Gorizia (†1402), daughter of Meinhard VI, Princely Count of Gorizia	Stjepan I Krčki, Zhupan of Požega, signatory of the Peace-treaty of Zadar (1358)	Elizabeta (fl. 1346–1347), married Pavao II Šubić of Bribir
Elizabeta (murdered 1422), married Fridrik II, Count of Celje	Nikola IV Frankopan Krčki (*? – †1432), Ban (viceroy) of Croatia (1426–1432)	a daughter
Ivan VI (Anž) Frankopan Cetinski (*? – †1436), co-Ban of Croatia (1432–1436), owner of Cetin	Nikola V Frankopan Ozaljski (*? – †1456/58), owner of Ozalj	Juraj I Frankopan (fl. 1416–1434)	Martin II Frankopan Trsatski (*? – †1479), owner of Trsat, Vinodol and Bakar	Bartol IX Frankopan Tržački (*1416(?) – †1458/61), owner of Tržac	Katarina (fl. 1416)	Andrija I Frankopan (*? – †1439)	Stjepan III Frankopan Modruški (c. 1416 – c. †1481/84), co-Ban of Croatia (1432–1437 and 1463–1464)	Sigismund (Žikmund) Frankopan Otočki (*? – †1465), owner of Otočac	Dujam IV Frankopan Slunjski (*? – †1487), owner of Slunj	Ivan VII Frankopan Krčki (*1424(?) – †1486), sole owner of Krk (1451–1480)
Juraj II F. Cetinski (fl. 1437–1469)	Bartol X F. Ozaljski (*? – †1474)	Nikola VI F. Tržački (*? – 1523)	Ivan VIII (Anž) F. Tržački (Brinjski) (c. 1458 – c. † 1521), owner of Brinje	Jelena (fl. 1513)	Barbara (fl. 1475–1504), married Franjo Berislavić, Ban of Jajce (†c. 1519)	Doroteja (fl. 1475–1479), married Karlo Kurjaković; mother of I. Karlović, Ban of Croatia	Bernardin F. Modruški (Ozaljski) (*1453 – †1529/30)	Doroteja (fl. 1489), married Stjepan; Babonić Blagajski	Barbara	Ana (*? – †1498)	Mihovil (Michael) I F. Slunjski (fl. 1487–1514)	Doroteja	Nikola VII F. Krčki	Ivan (died young c. 1465)	Katarina (*? – †c. 1520)
Ivan IX F. Cetinski (*? – Krbava field, 1493)	Andrija (Andrew) II F. Cetinski (fl. 1466–1499)	Mihovil II F. Cetinski (fl. 1466–1498)	Grgur (Gregory) (*1459 – †1520), archbishop of Kalocsa (1503–1520)	Krsto (Christopher) II F. Tržački (*? – †1530), owner of Tržac	Vuk (Wolf) I F. Tržački (Brinjski) (*? – †1546) signatory of the Cetingrad Charter (1527)	Katarina (fl. 1535)	Ferdinand F. Ozaljski (*? – †c. 1525/27)	Beatrica (*1480 – †1510), married Ivaniš Korvin, Ban of Croatia	Krsto (Christopher) I F. Ozaljski (*1482 – †1527), Ban (viceroy) of Croatia	Matija (Matthew) I F. Ozaljski (*? – †1518)	Ivan X F. Ozaljski (*c. 1490 – †1543)	Juraj III F. Slunjski (*? – †1553), signatory of the Cetingrad Charter (1527)	Ana Babonić, princess of Blagaj	Matija II F. Slunjski (*? – †Mohács, 1526)	Petar II F. Slunjski (fl. 1514)
Ivan XI (Franjo) F. Cetinski (fl. 1503–1527; †1543)	Nikola VIII F. Tržački (*? – †1575/77) married Dora, princess of Blagaj	Elizabeta, married Ivan Alapić	Stjepan IV F. Ozaljski (*? – †1577)	Katarina (*? – †1561), married Nikola IV Zrinski, Ban of Croatia	Elizabeta (*1496/97 – †1508)	Krsto (*1499 – †1505)	Franjo I F. Slunjski (*1536 – †1572), co-Ban of Croatia (1567–1572)	Ana	Katarina (fl. 1555–1580)
Stjepan V F. Tržački	Uršula	Klara	Gašpar I F. Tržački (*? – †1578/88(?))	Katarina, daughter of Ivan Lenković
Juraj IV F. Tržački	Nikola IX F. Tržački (*? – †1647), Ban (viceroy) of Croatia (1617–1622)	Vuk II Krsto F. Tržački (c. 1578/88(?) – †1652)
Gašpar II F. Tržački (*? – †1653)	Juraj V F. Tržački (c. 1620 – †1661)	Ana Katarina (*1625 – †1673), married Petar Zrinski, Ban (viceroy) of Croatia	Fran II Krsto F. Tržački (*1643–1671), beheaded in Wiener Neustadt	Julia di Naro (*1647 – †?), niece of Cardinal; Francesco Barberini
Marija	Juliana (*? – †1693)	Nikola X F. Tržački (*? – †1659)

== See also ==
- House of Frankopan
- List of rulers of Croatia
- Šubić family tree
- Zrinski family tree
- Frangipani family

== Sources ==
- Fine, John V.A. (2006). "Appendix: Simplified genealogy of the Frankopans, Šubićs and Zrinskis". When ethnicity did not matter in the Balkans. Ann Arbor: The University of Michigan. ISBN 978-0-472-02560-2.
