= Skrad (castle) =

Coordinates: 45°20′44″N 15°30′10″E

- Croatia

Site information
- Type: Castle
- Open to the public: Yes
- Condition: Ruins

Location
- Location within Croatia

Site history
- Built: XIV
- Materials: Limestone

Skrad (pronounced [skraːd] is a medieval ruined castle located on the right bank of the Korana river in modern Karlovac County, Croatia. It overlooks the river gorge from a small hill at the end of a larger hill, whose height above sea level is 430 m. It is roughly triangular in plan, and once included 6 towers, a church, and a number buildings, though today very little rises above grass-level. It was one of the larger castles in the region, though not quite as large as Modruše or Cetin.

== Geography ==
Apart from a small field on the opposite bank uphill from the village just downstream from the castle, the area is completely free of landmines, according to the interactive map on the website of the Croatian Mine Action Centre, as accessed July 2017.

== History ==
The first known owners of the castle were members of the House of Frankopan. Though soon after its first mention, by the daughter of Stjepan Frankopan († c. 1390), Elizabeth, it came into the hands of Frederick II, Count of Celje together with the lands belonging to Steničnjak. After the death of the last member of the House of Celje, Ulrich, king Ladislaus the Posthumous gave Skrad to Andreas Kreiger, the new Captain of Celje, who had acquired Kostel Castle on the river Kupa.

In 1461, it had a market and 70 residents.

About 1463, Skrad was bought by Martin Frankopan (†1479), who gave king Matthias Corvinus the castle of Krupa on the river Una, and promised to hold the castles of Lipovac, Steničnjak, and Kostajnica only for the duration of his lifetime, and that after his death they would belong to the crown. In recognition of Martin's services, king Matthias allowed in 1464 for Martin to hold all his possessions even after his death. He was then officially made the owner of Skrad, including the clan of Čević and two clans of Kolečani (Sv. Petar).

In 1466, Martin gave Skrad to Ivan Benvenjud, son of Toma Benvenjud Ostrožinski, lord of Okić and Cetin, as a friend in difficult times. At one time after this, Ivan rescued Martin from an imprisonment in the castle of Brinje at the hands of his nephew Anž († c. 1521), by giving up Skrad itself for Martin's freedom. Martin, out of gratitude, gave him Kostajnica on the Una for a very small price. King Matthias himself, in 1480, allowed Ivan Benvenjud to hold Kostajnica, on the condition that he give the king Skrad, Ostrožin, and Trsat, which he had received from Martin upon the death of the latter the previous year. Then the king changed his mind, and in 1481 demanded that Benvenjud surrender Kostajnica. When he refused, he was imprisoned, until at length he gave in, and Kostajnica was given to Blaise Magyar, Ban of Croatia. Later, king Matthias gave Kostajnica to Vuk Grgurević, Despot of Serbia, whose wife happened to be Martin's niece, and upon the latter's death, the king confirmed the transfer of Kostajnica into the hands of the deceased's sons, Đorđe and Jovan. King Matthias died, and Ivan Benvenjud and his brothers sought to win their possessions back. Even in 1492, when they sold the claim to Kostajnica to Ban Ladislav of Egervár, they kept the claim to Skrad until their house died out in 1504.

King Vladislaus II of Hungary tried to give Skrad and Ostrožin to his treasurer, but Bernardin Frankopan (†1529) held that he had the right of inheritance, because of his uncle Martin, and in 1505, he gathered an army of horsemen, foot soldiers, cannons, and guns, and conquered Skrad, capturing the wlidow of Benvenjud, Ana, whom he placed under house arrest, pillaging the city. Later, Ana settled with lord Bernardin, who was succeeded by his grandchild, Stjepan Frankopan (†1577), and then later, by a series of agreements, the sons of Stjepan's brother-in-law Nikola Šubić Zrinski (†1566), Juraj, Nikola, and Ivan. In the process of negotiation, the elder Nikola had, before his death, given Skrad to Stjepan in 1561, but in 1566 Stjepan renounced all his possessions in favour of the Zrinski family after they had helped him out of a political predicament. In 1569, Stjepan gave Skrad to Franjo Frankopan (†1572), who gave it later that year to the captain of the royal border forces, Juraj Babonožić of the Mogorović clan, who was unsuccessfully opposed by the descendants of the Benvenjud family.

Skrad suffered severe losses in the Turkish invasions. In the raids before the Battle of Krbava Field in 1493, the trg of Skrad lost two thirds of its population. In 1524, the Turks led a major raid that included the area surrounding Skrad and Dubovac. In 1557, Malkoč beg of the Sanjak of Bosnia laid waste to the region around the rivers Korana and Mrežnica, especially Skrad, Hoisić, and Ogulin. At the time, ban Péter Erdődy was at the christening of his child, which is a possible reason for the timing of the raid, as the ban was known for his military prowess. A document from 1558 shows that Skrad had been destroyed by the Turks, sustaining heavy damage in the process, and that the area had been almost completely depopulated. The inhabitants of the area had taken refuge, amongst other places, on an island of the Mrežnica near Janjče, which they had fortified for the purpose. In 1576, the Turks with a small army of 1500 raided the area around Skrad and Blagaj, capturing about 170 people. Skrad was held until 1585, when the Turks burned Skrad, where the widow of the Babonožić house lived. After that, there was a wooden fort on the opposite bank of the Korana, named Novi Skrad "New Skrad". After the reconquest, the surrounding area was resettled beginning in 1686, mostly by Serbs from Bosnia, though on the left bank, the descendants of the original inhabitants persist.

In 1620, Krištof Tadiolović was captain of Skrad.

In 1699–1865 it had a Military Frontier guard, after which it was left to ruins.

== See also ==
- Frankopan family tree
- List of castles in Croatia
- Military history of Croatia
- Zrinski family tree

== Bibliography ==
- Kruhek, Milan (1976). Stari gradovi između Kupe i Korane [Old Castles Between the Kupa and the Korana] (PDF) (in Croatian).
