= Ivan Frankopan Cetinski =

Ivan IX Frankopan Cetinski (English: John IX Frankopan of Cetin) was a Croatian nobleman. A member of Cetin branch of the Frankopan noble family and a grandson of Ivan VI (Anž) Frankopan, Cetinski was the knez (prince) of Cetin Castle.

Cetinski was one of the commanders of Croatian forces in the Battle of Krbava field, in which he died. His son, Franjo Frankopan, became archbishop of Kalocsa.

== See also ==
- Ivan VI (Anž) Frankopan
- Frankopan family tree
