= Franjo Frankopan =

Franjo Frankopan O.F.M. Obs.
- Archbishop of Kalocsa
- Church: Catholic Church
- Archdiocese: Archdiocese of Kalocsa
- In office: 1530 – 1543
- Predecessor: János Ország de Guth
- Successor: György Draskovich
- Other post: Bishop of Eger (1539-1543)

Orders
- Consecration: December 1540 by Gregor Angerer

Personal details
- Died: 1543

Count Franjo Frankopan Cetinski (Latin: Franciscus Frangepanus, Hungarian: Ferenc Frangepán, died 1543) was a Croatian nobleman, Latinist and diplomat.

Frankopan was the son of knez (prince) Ivan Frankopan Cetinski and the member of Cetin branch of the Frankopan family. His given name was Ivan, but after joining the Franciscan order he took the name Franjo. He followed the steps of his uncle Grgur and became archbishop of Kalocsa and bishop of Eger. He also served as diplomat on the court of Janos Zapolya. In 1541, he attended the Diet of Regensburg where he made a speech against the Turks (Oratio reverendissimi in Christo patris) which was soon printed.

== See also ==
- Frankopan family tree
- Skrad castle

== Sources ==
- Franjo Emanuel Hoško: Franjo Frankapan (Hrvatski biografski leksikon, Croatian)
