= Trsat Castle =

Castle in Trsat, Croatia

Coordinates: 45.332°N 14.455°E

Trsat Castle Gradina Trsat
- Rijeka; Croatia
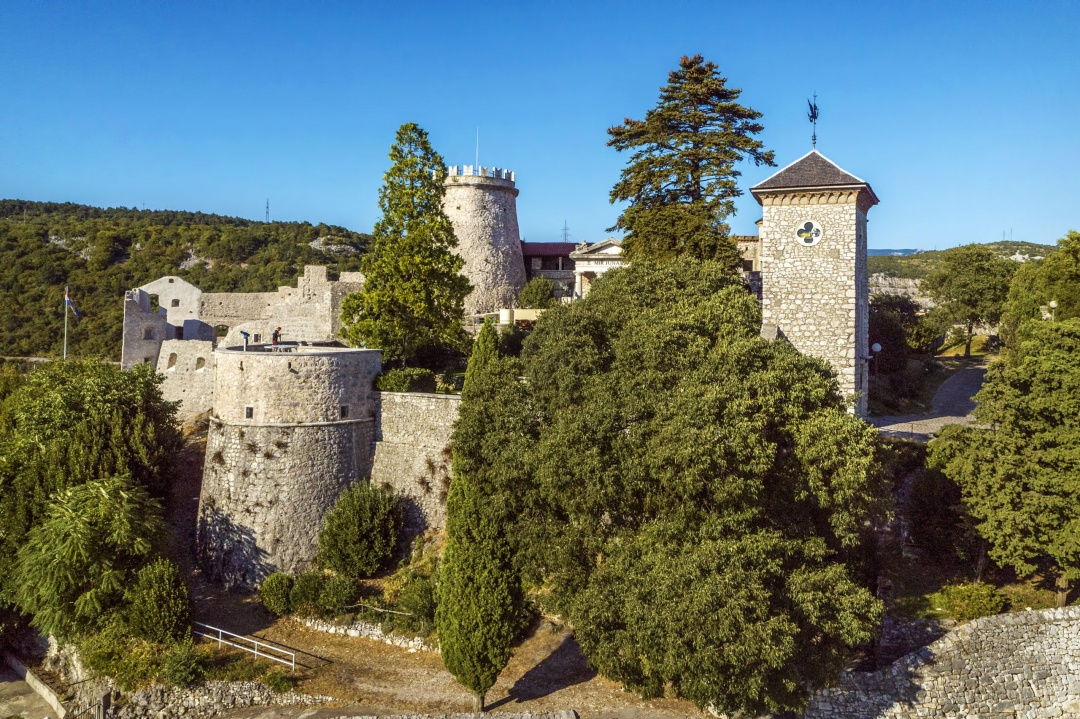
- Trsat Castle

Site information
- Type: Castle

Location
- Location in Croatia

Site history
- Materials: Stone

Trsat Castle (Croatian: Gradina Trsat) is a castle in Trsat, Croatia. It is thought that the castle lies at the exact spot of an ancient Illyrian and Roman fortress. The Croatian noble Vuk Krsto Frankopan is buried in one of the churches. The Trsat castle was completely reconstructed and renovated in the 19th century when the mausoleum of the military commander Laval Nugent was built in its interior. The courtyard of the castle has now been turned into a restaurant and many tourists visit the place during the summer months.

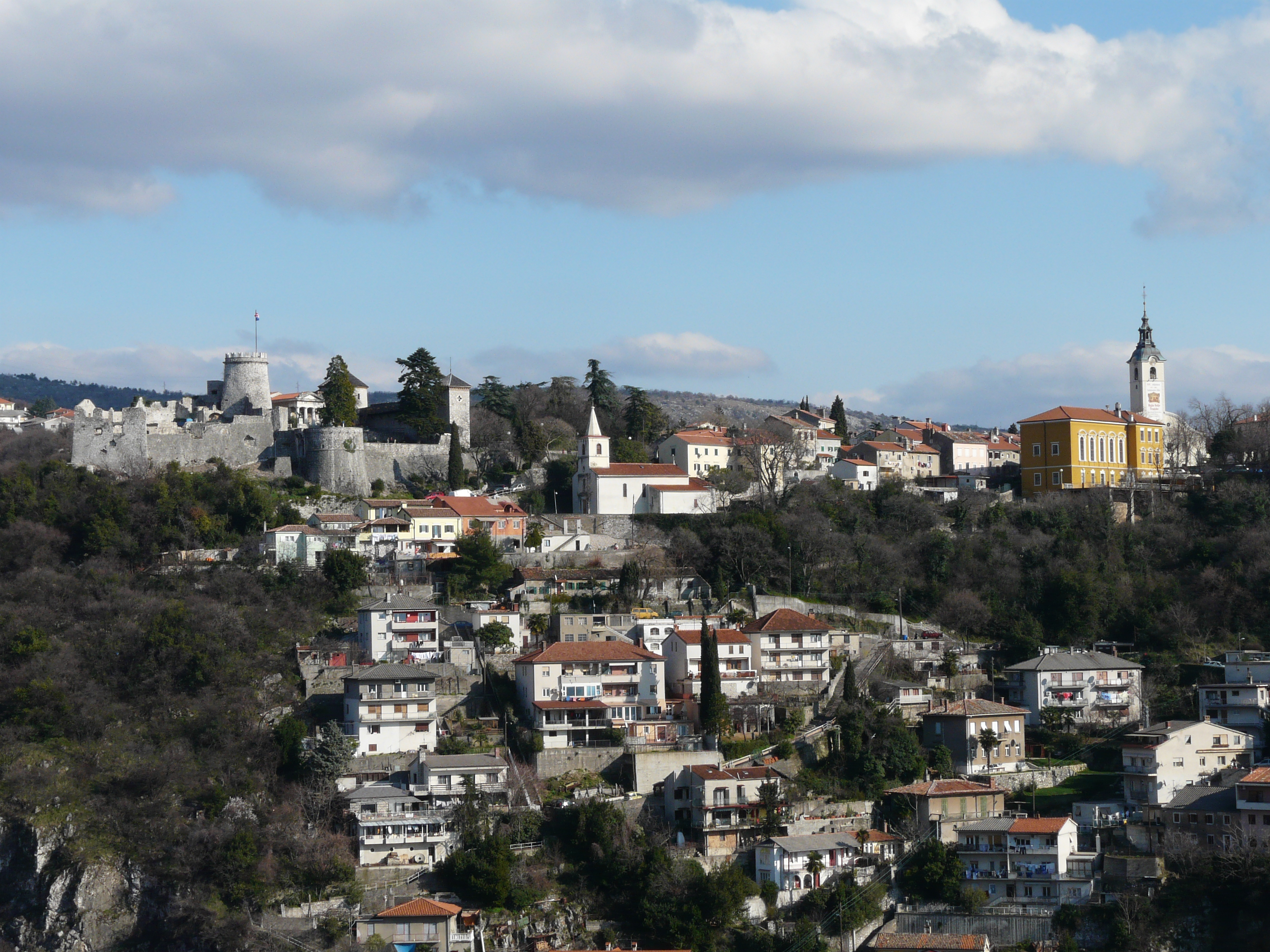
View of Trsat and Trsat Castle from WSW, from Rijeka mountain area.

== History ==
The thirteenth century Trsat castle, whose site has been in use from Roman days for being an easy place from which to control access to the sea along the Rječina River, is situated on the steep hill overlooking the Rječina gorge on its left bank, just above the town of Rijeka. It may be that a Iapodian hill-fort, Darsata, used to be there, after which the Roman fortification Tarsatica was named. This Roman fort was of vital importance on a road that connected Aquileia to Pannonia and Senia (Senj). It was owned by Frankopan family who built the present castle, on the site occupied by the Illirian Tarsatica, to protect their holdings in Vinodol.

The capture of the Castle of Trsat compelled the Ban of Croatia, Andrew Bot of Bajna (Bajna is a village in Hungary, near Esztergom), to intervene in the Austro-Venetian war, and in June 1509 he first recaptured Trsat with his Croatian army and then entered Rijeka after expelling the Venetians. In October 1509, the Venetians withdrew for good and Rijeka returned to the possessions of Maximilian of Habsburg. This notable episode is the sole event which links Rijeka with Venice, and consequently with Italy, during the whole of its history from the 7th century on.

In the 17th century the castle fell into decay due to the receding threats from Venice and the Ottoman Empire. Its decline was accelerated by the earthquake of 1750. In the year 1811, during the Napoleonic Wars, Captain Hoste in pursuit of the French, arrived with his frigate at Fiume where he made himself lieutenant-governor. The situation in Trieste soon drew him away, but in 1826 he had the satisfaction of handing the castle over to Field-Marshal Laval Nugent von Westmeath, an Irishman then commanding the Austrian troops in the vicinity, for the purpose of conferring on him the rank of an Austrian noble. The general was later honoured by the Austrians and presented with the castle at Trsat as his residence. He had it restored in Neo-Gothic style and built a mausoleum adorned with the coat of arms of the Nugent family. It remained in the Nugent family until nearly the end of the Second World War when the general's great-granddaughter, Countess Nugent, died at the age of 82.

== Gallery ==
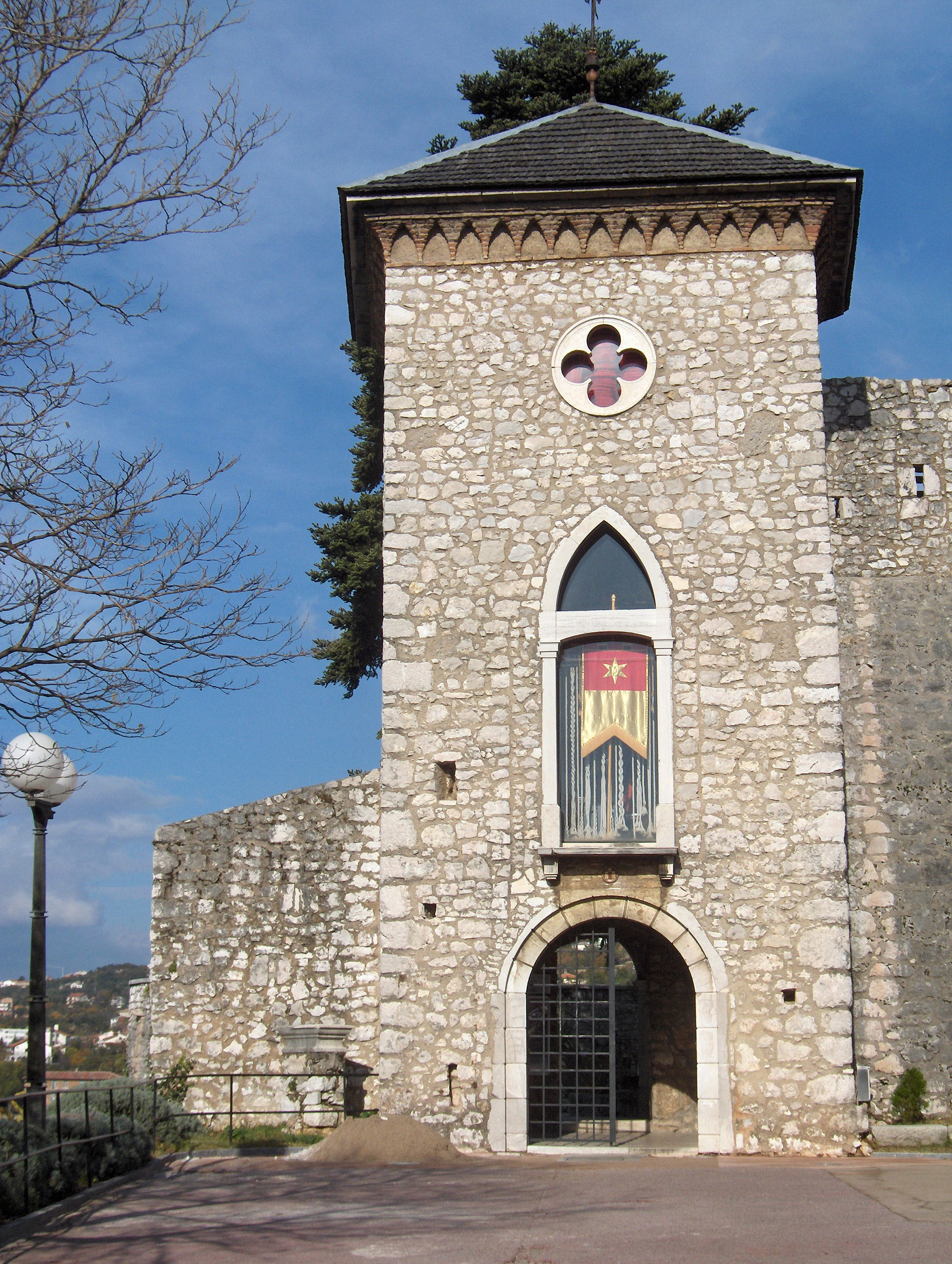
Entrance of Trsat Castle, Rijeka, Croatia

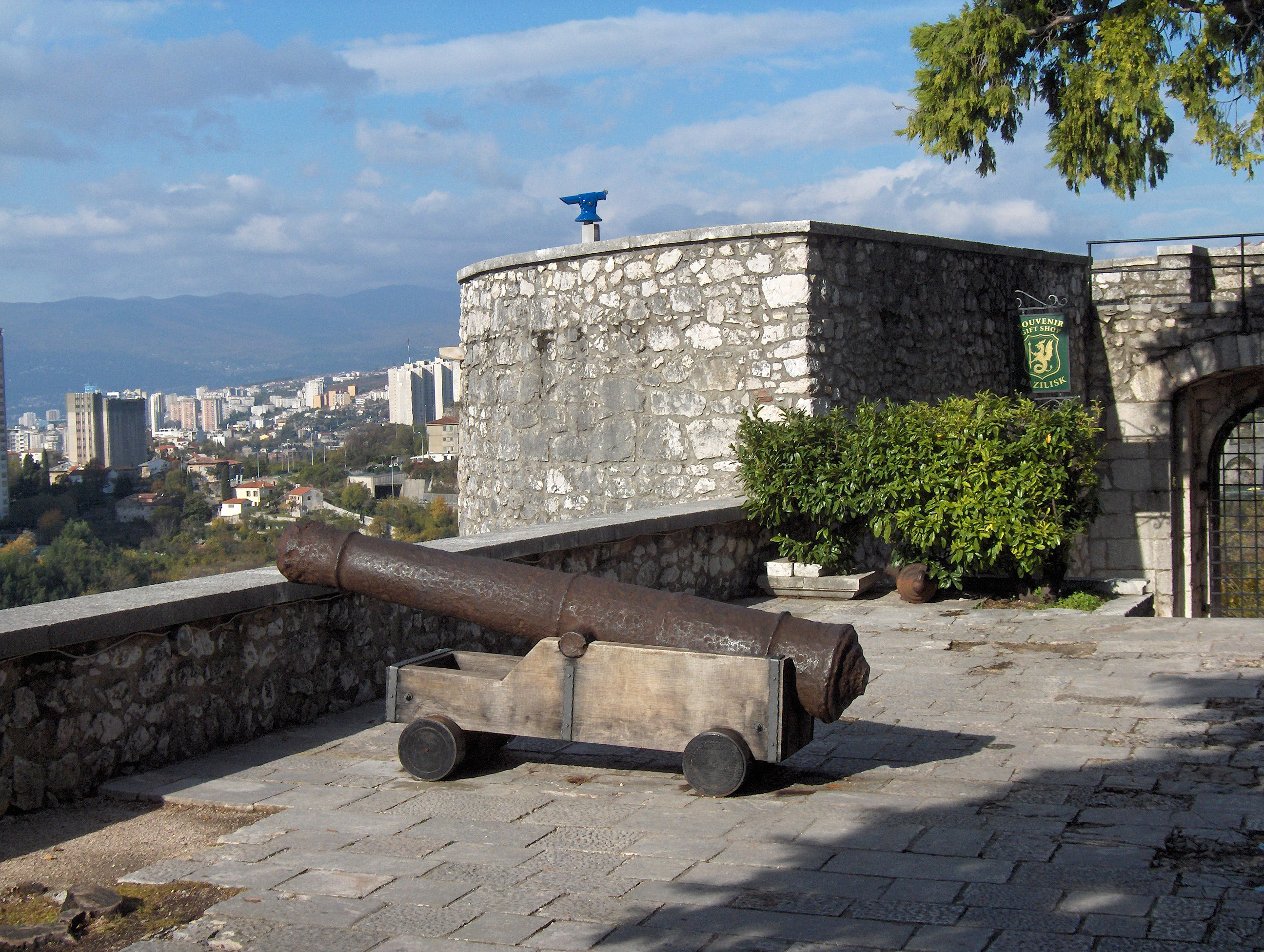
Old muzzle-loading gun

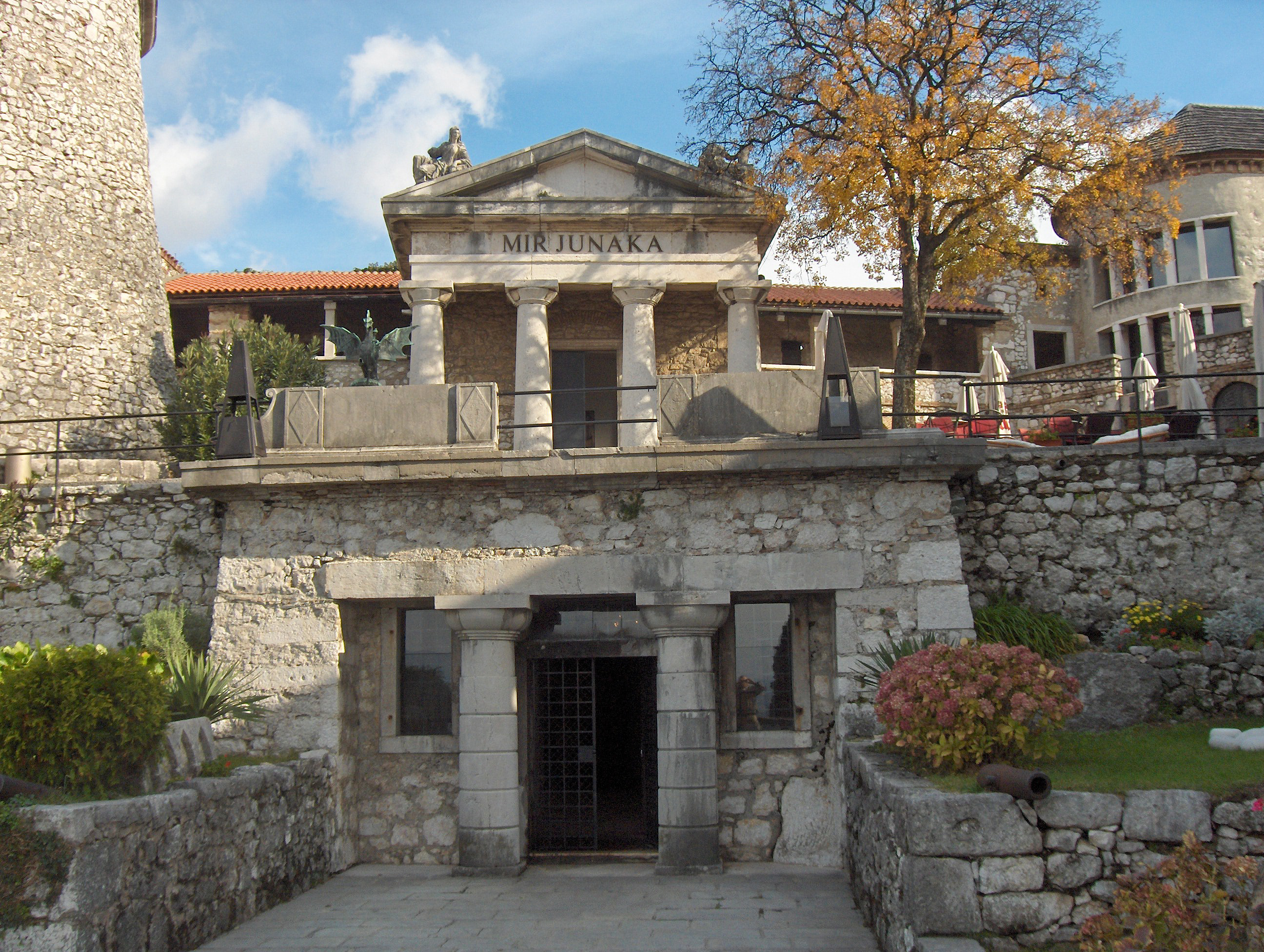
Former mausoleum (Mir junaka) and the dungeon underneath

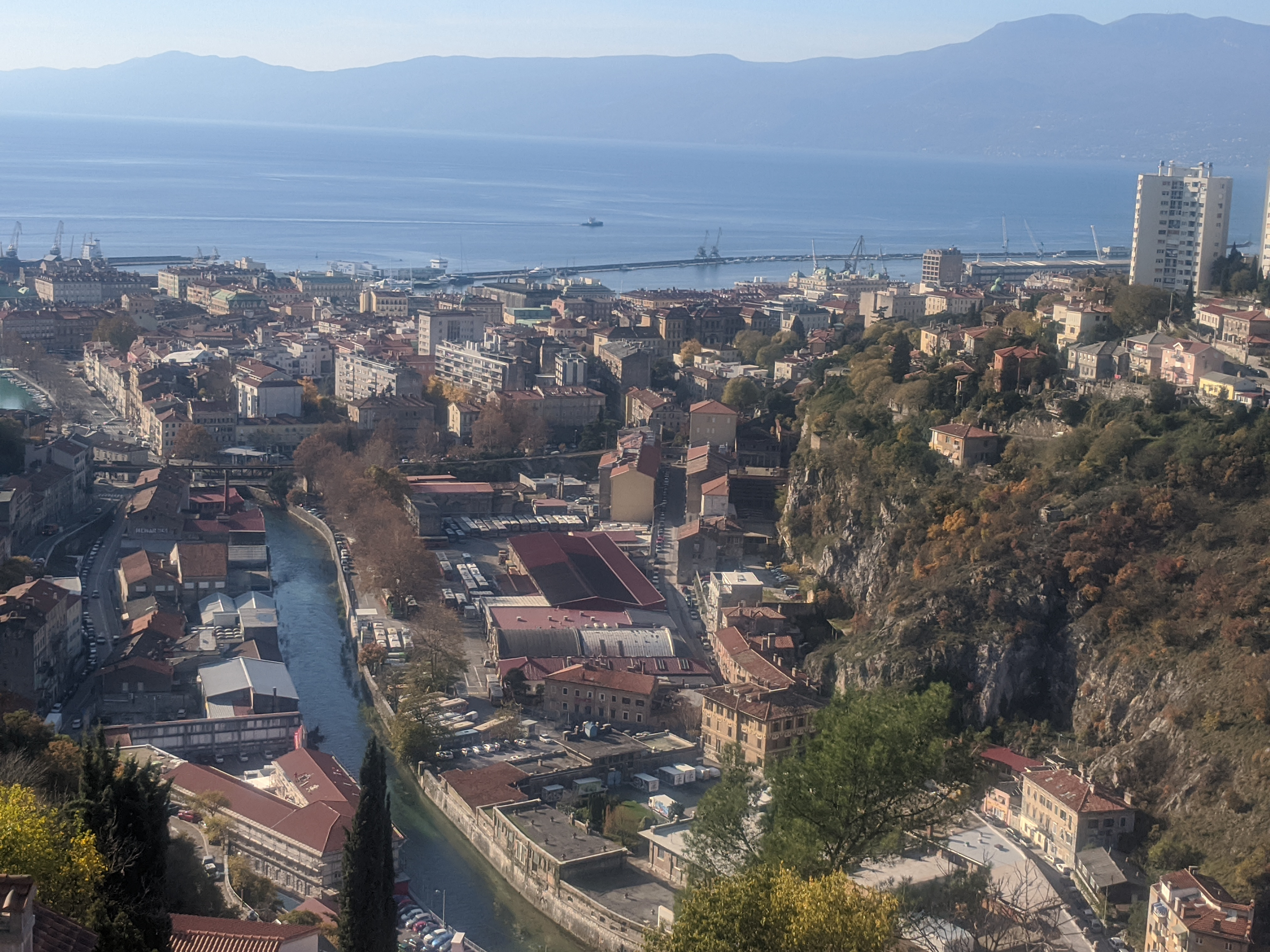
Rijeka as seen from Trsat Castle

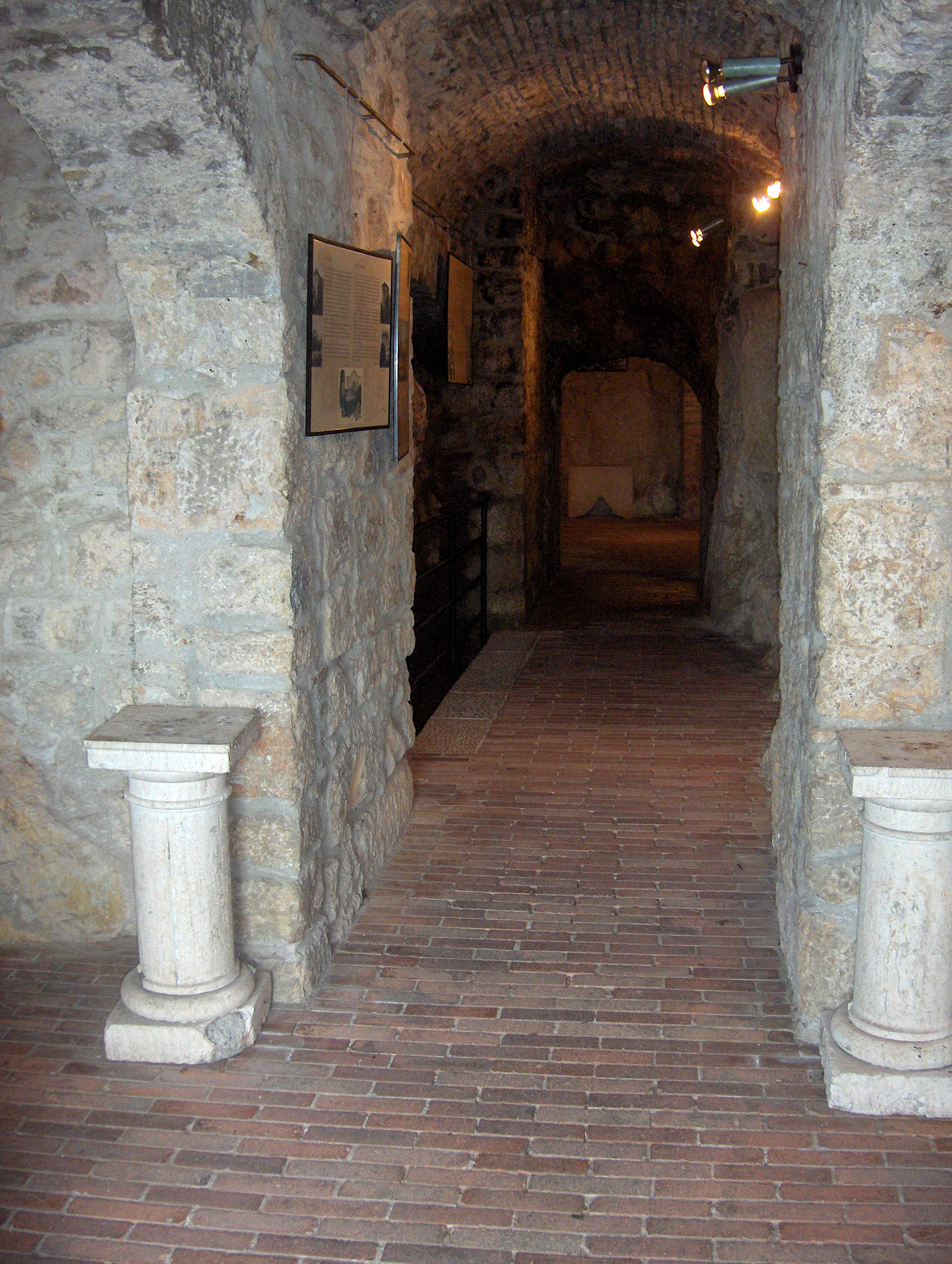
Castle dungeon

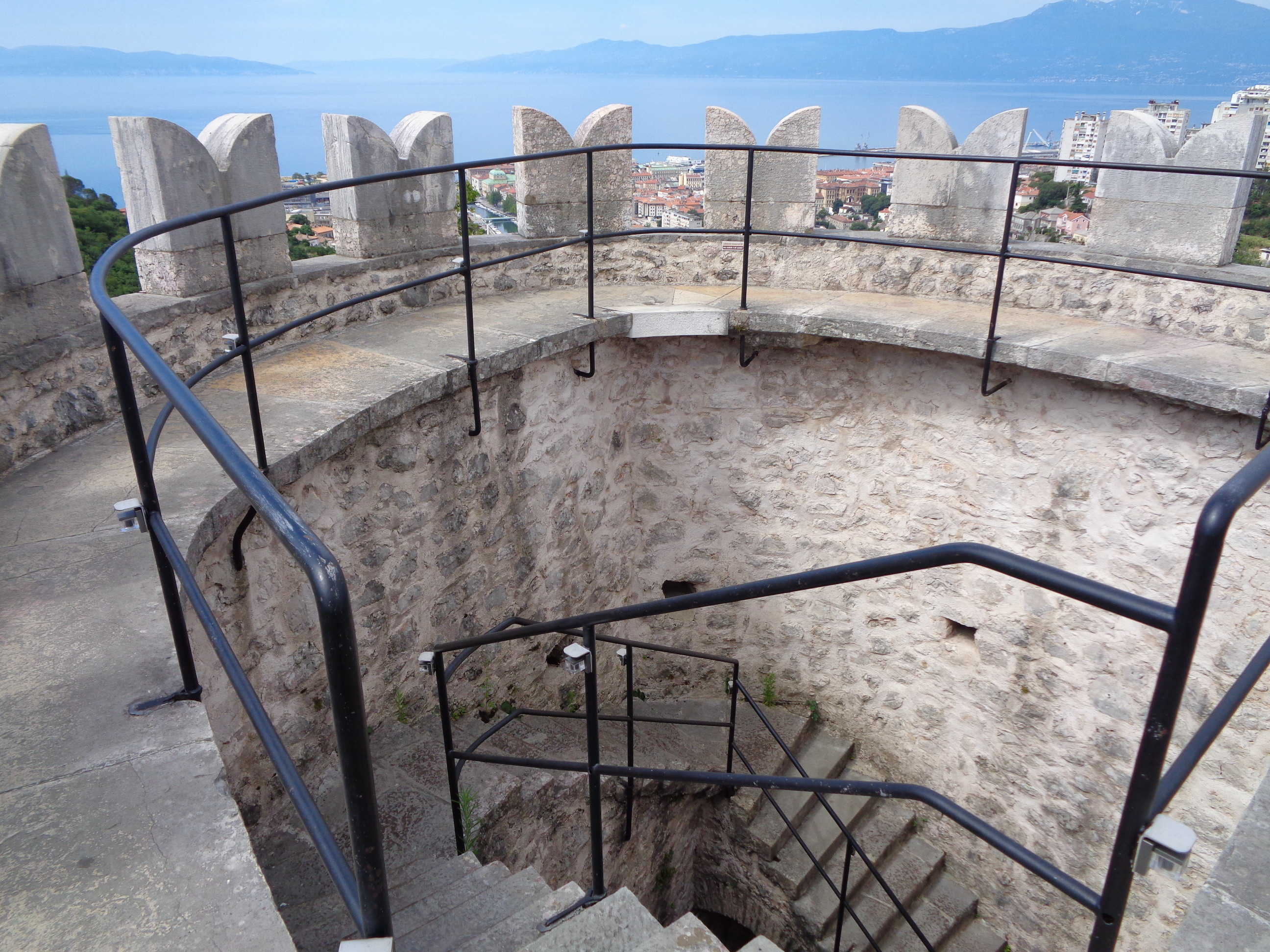
Round tower interior

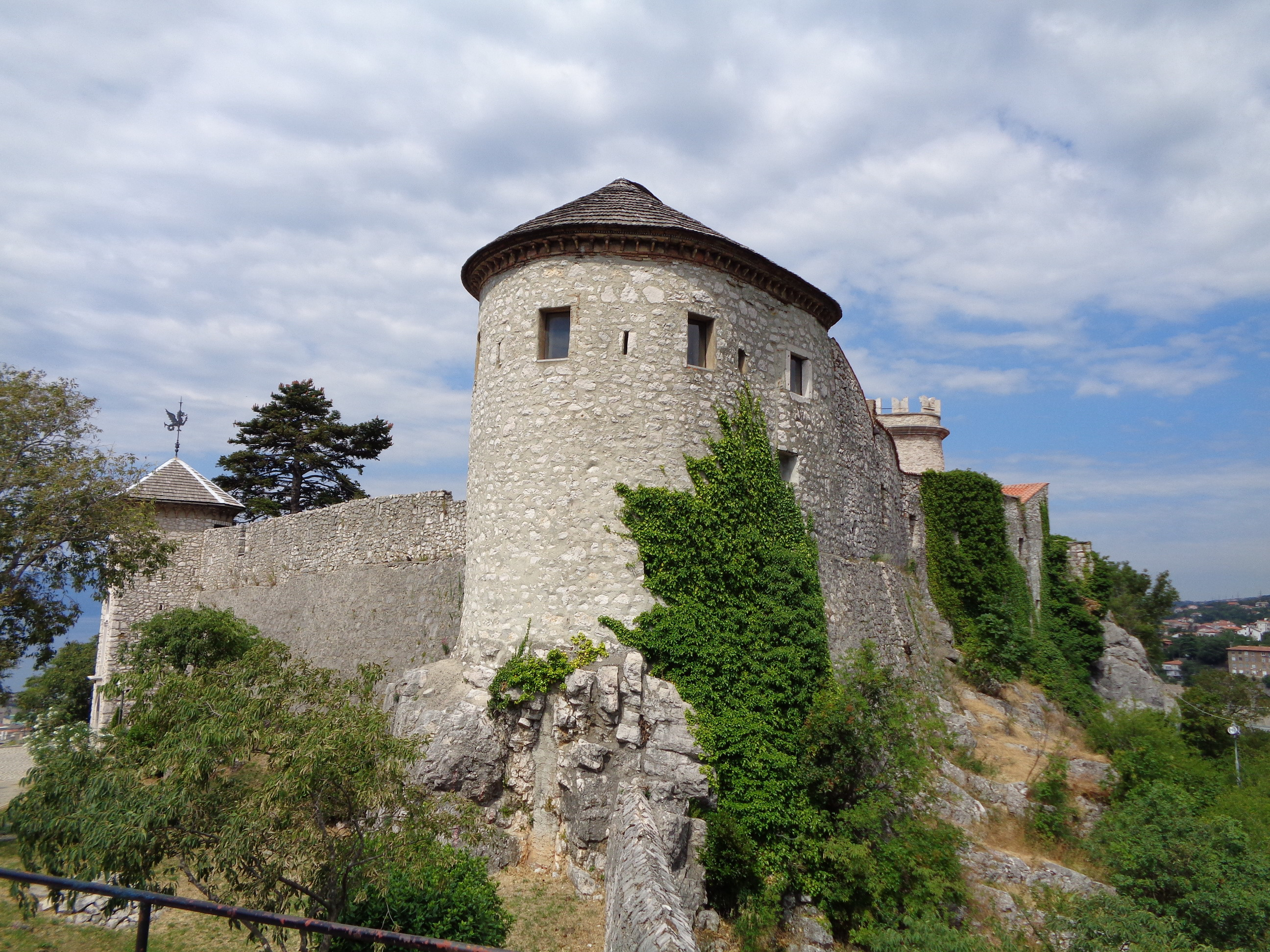
Oval tower
