= Bartholomew of Krk =

Croatian nobleman

Bartholomew of Krk was a Croatian nobleman, a member of the Frankopan family, who received the hereditary title of Count of Modruš from King Béla III (r. 1172–1196) in 1193. This is the earliest certain example of an office being granted as a hereditary dignity by a Hungarian king.

== Sources ==
- Curta, Florin (2019). Eastern Europe in the Middle Ages (500–1300), Volume I. Brill's Companion to European History. Vol. 19. Leiden, NL: Brill. ISBN 978-90-04-41534-8.
- Rady, Martyn (2000). Nobility, Land and Service in Medieval Hungary. Palgrave. ISBN 0-333-80085-0.
