= Vuk II Krsto Frankopan =

Croatian nobleman and soldier

Vuk Krsto Frankopan
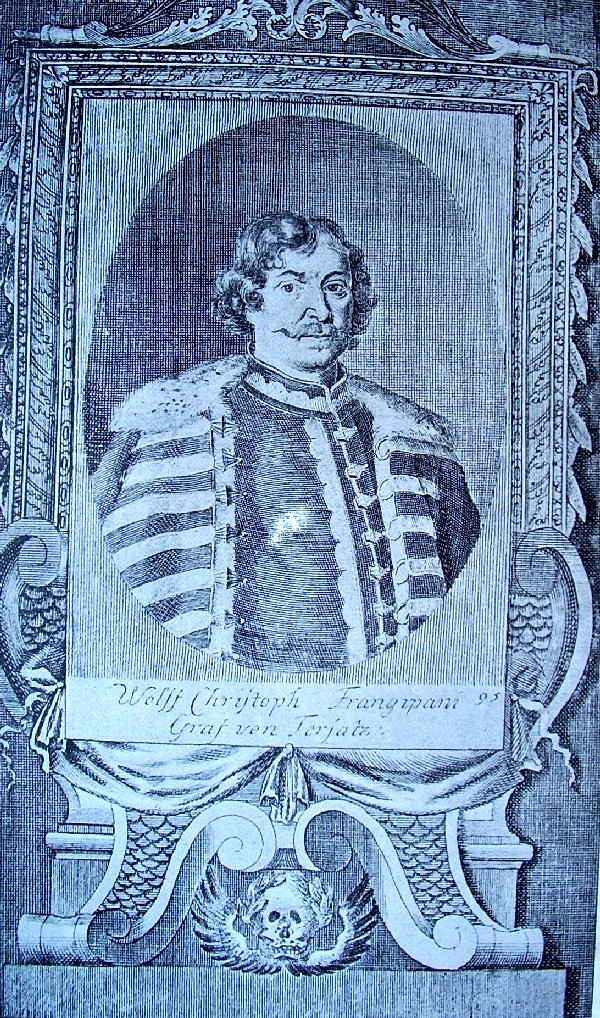
- Full name: Vuk II Krsto Frankopan Tržički
- Born: c. 1578
- Died: c. 1652 (aged 73–74)
- Buried: Trsat
- Noble family: House of Frankopan
- Spouses: Jelena Berislavić; Uršula Inhofer; Dora Haller
- Issue: Gašpar Frankopan; Juraj Frankopan; Katarina Zrinska; Fran Krsto Frankopan
- Father: Gašpar Frankopan
- Mother: Katarina Lenković
- Occupation: General

Vuk II Krsto Frankopan Tržački (English: Wolf II Christopher Frankopan of Tržac) was a Croatian nobleman and soldier of the Frankopan family, father of noted poet and politician Fran Krsto Frankopan. He was born about 1588.

He was the son of Gašpar I Frankopan Tržački, captain of Ogulin, and his wife Katarina née Lenković, daughter of Ivan Lenković, Uskoks leader. Educated in Ljubljana and in Italy, he started his military career as officer on the Croatian Military Frontier, later becoming a commander of Tržan Castle in Modruš (1612), captain of Ogulin (1618) and lieutenant colonel of Senj (1620).

Vuk is most well known as head of the Karlovac generalate. During his reign, many fortresses were constructed and some expanded. Same thing happened in the area with many churches, some of which have survived to this day. He died in 1652. Vuk Krsto Frankopan is buried in the Franciscan church at Trsat, now a part of Croatian city Rijeka.

== Sources ==
- "FRANKAPAN, Vuk II. Krsto Tržački". Croatian Biographical Lexicon (in Croatian). Miroslav Krleža Institute of Lexicography.
