= Dujam II Frankopan =

Dujam (II) Frankopan
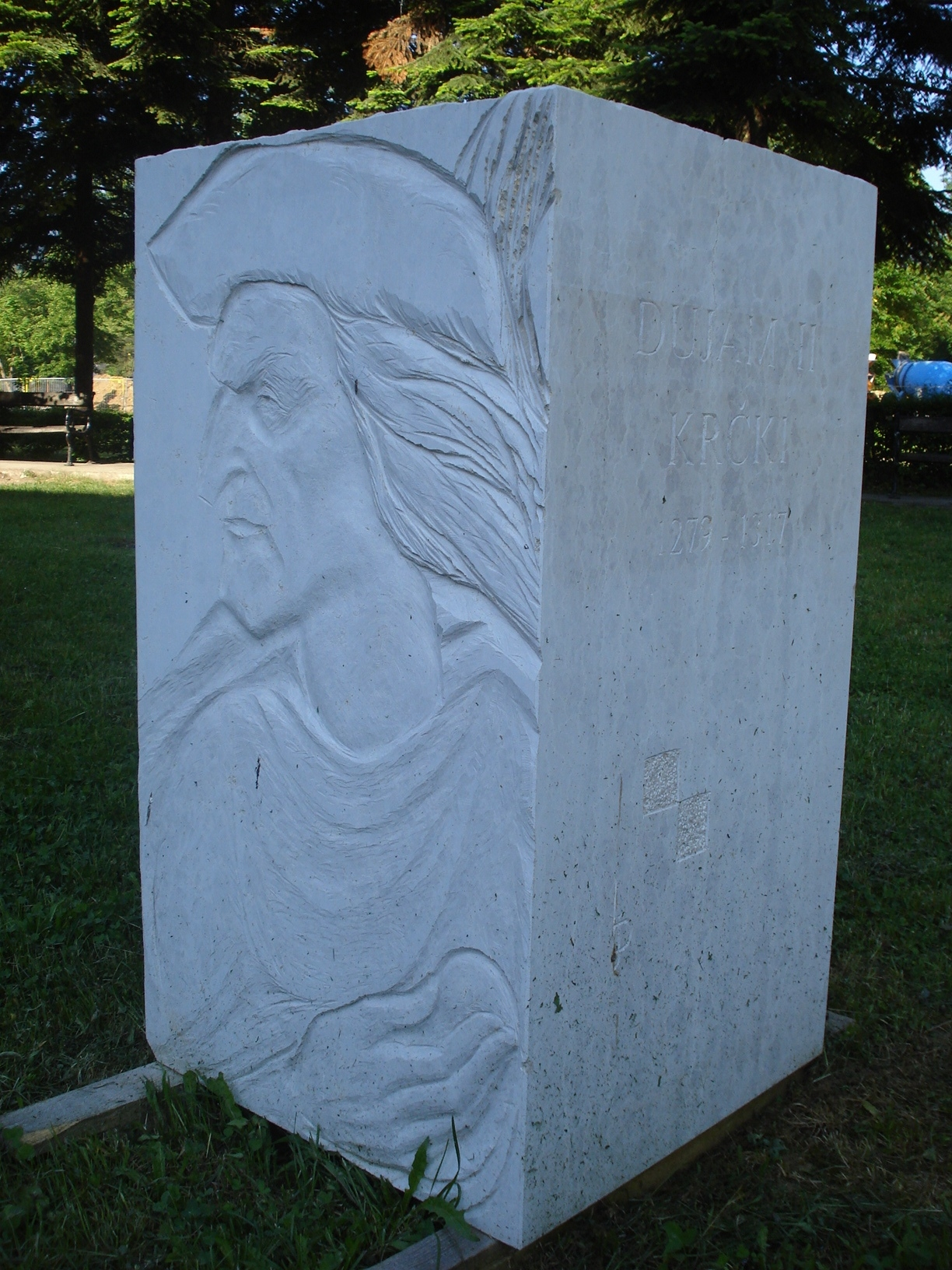

Count of Krk
- Reign: c. 1288–1317
- Predecessor: Frederick II
- Successor: Frederick III
- Died: 1317
- Noble family: House of Frankopan
- Spouse: Ursia Ursini
- Issue: Frederick III
- Father: Frederick II

Dujam (II) Frankopan (Hungarian: Frangepán (II.) Duim; Italian: Doimo (II) Frangipani; died 1317), also Dujam II of Krk (Croatian: Dujam II. Krčki), was a Croatian noble, an early member of the illustrious House of Frankopan, who took control of the Adriatic Sea's western coast in Croatia, which had been in a personal union with Hungary since 1102. As Count of Krk (or Veglia), he also ruled the area of Modruš and Senj.

== Lord of Krk ==
Dujam Frankopan's province among the oligarchs in early 14th century

Dujam II was born into the family, which after 1430 was known as the House of Frankopan, in the middle of the 13th century as the only son of Frederick II, Count of Krk. He was first mentioned by contemporary records in 1279. His father died sometime after 1288, since then Dujam became Lord of Krk and its surrounding areas. He married Ursia from the noble family Ursini. He had a son, Frederick III.

Following Ladislaus IV's accession to the throne in 1272, Hungary and Croatia were in a state of constant anarchy and several influential lords could manage to govern their territory autonomously by usurping royal prerogatives in their dominion, even after the death of Andrew III (r. 1290–1301) and extinction of the Árpád dynasty. Historian Gyula Kristó listed Dujam among these powerful "oligarchs" or "provincial lords". In 1300, a Venetian source, Liber Pactorum refers to comes Dujam as "hereditary lord of Krk". He also inherited the title podesta of Senj from his father Frederick II.

Already since 1290, he had supported the power aspirations of the Capetian House of Anjou – Charles Martel, then his son Charles Robert – along with the Šubići and Babonići kindreds. In June 1291, Dujam Frankopan and Radoslav Babonić visited the Neapolitan court at the first time. In May 1300, Dujam, among others, personally accompanied Charles Robert from Naples to Hungary, while received land donations (the three littoral counties of Modruš-Rijeka, Vinodol and Gacka župa, where he also owned Otočac Castle after this) by Charles II of Naples, grandfather of the young prince. They arrived to Split (Spalato) in August 1300, where Paul Šubić greeted them. From Split, Šubić escorted Charles to Zagreb where Ugrin Csák also swore loyalty to the prince. After the sudden death of Andrew in early 1301, Charles had to face rival pretenders for the Hungarian throne. The Croatian and Dalmatian lords have assured the continuous contact between Naples and Hungary during the war of succession. According to Ottokar aus der Gaal's Steirische Reimchronik ("Styrian Rhyming Chronicle"), Dujam and the Babonići met with Frederick the Fair in Maribor (Marburg) in 1308, where they promised to join a campaign against Bohemia the following year.

Dujam and his son Frederick III were the only provincial lords, who remained faithful to Charles I, when the King started his unification war against the oligarchs after 1310. Dujam, who died in 1317, and his son successfully avoided open conflict with Charles, who has defeated all provincial domains by 1323.

== Relations with Venice ==
Dujam's relation with the Republic of Venice was more complicated despite the vassal and family relationships between the Frankopans and the Venetian aristocracy. In 1308, Doge Pietro Gradenigo prevented Dujam's plan to get a husband in Hungary for his niece, the orphan Zanetta (daughter of the late Leonard Frankopan, Dujam's cousin), who was also a niece of Gradenigo. The doge referred to the "insufferable and perilous conditions in Hungary and its connected territories", when adopted the child himself.

== Sources ==
- Engel, Pál (1988). "Az ország újraegyesítése. I. Károly küzdelmei az oligarchák ellen (1310–1323) [Reunification of the Realm. The Struggles of Charles I Against the Oligarchs (1310–1323)]". Századok (in Hungarian). 122 (1–2). Magyar Történelmi Társulat: 89–146. ISSN 0039-8098.
- Jászay, Magda (1990). Velence és Magyarország [Venice and Hungary] (in Hungarian). Gondolat Könyvkiadó. ISBN 963-28-2349-4.
- Kristó, Gyula (1979). A feudális széttagolódás Magyarországon [Feudal Anarchy in Hungary] (in Hungarian). Akadémiai Kiadó. ISBN 963-05-1595-4.
- Kristó, Gyula; Makk, Ferenc (1988). Károly Róbert emlékezete [The Memory of Charles Robert] (in Hungarian). Európa. ISBN 963-0743-94-9.
- Kristó, Gyula (2003). "I. Károly király harcai a tartományurak ellen (1310–1323) [The Struggles of Charles I Against the Oligarchs (1310–1323)]". Századok (in Hungarian). 137 (2). Magyar Történelmi Társulat: 297–347. ISSN 0039-8098.
- Rudolf, Veronika (2023). Közép-Európa a hosszú 13. században [Central Europe in the Long 13th Century] (in Hungarian). Arpadiana XV., Research Centre for the Humanities. ISBN 978-963-416-406-7.
