= Ivan VII Frankopan =

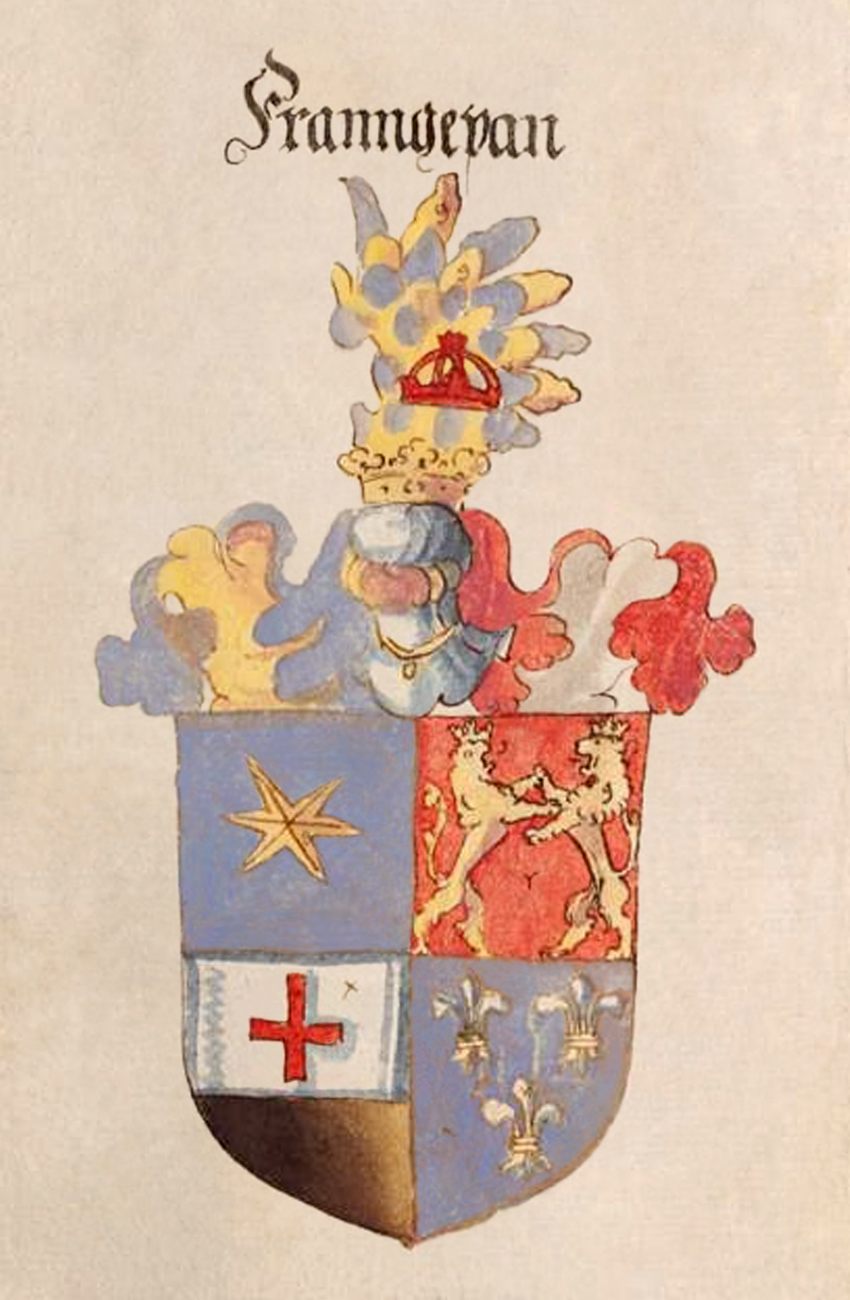
Coat of arms of the Frankopan (Franngepan) family

Ivan VII or Ivan Krčki (of Krk) was the only prince of the semi-independent united Krk (the Principality of Krk) from 1451 to 1480. He was a prince of the House of Frankopan.

As he needed more manpower, Frankopan settled Morlachs and Vlachs (Romanians, later Istro-Romanians) in the western parts of the island, namely in the areas in and around Dubašnica and Poljica and between the castles of Dobrinj and Omišal. This community survived until the death of the last speaker of the Istro-Romanian dialect of Krk in 1875.
