= Principality of Krk =

Medieval European polity

The Principality of Krk was a semi-independent principality on the Croatian-Adriatic island of Krk that existed from 1451 to 1480 during the Late Middle Ages. Previous to the principality's foundation, Krk and the surrounding lands were ruled by several Frangipani (Frankopan) counts. In 1451, count Ivan VII, who ruled parts of Krk and parts of the nearby mainland, in a dispute with his brother, traded all his land on the mainland for his brother's land on the rest of the island, forming a Krk under the single ruler Ivan VII. During Ivan's reign (1451–1480) many religious structures and monuments were formed, improving the towns on the island greatly. The island's semi-independence came to an end when the Republic of Venice invaded in 1480, when they tricked Ivan VII into leaving the island. The Frangipani family never had the title of Prince but only of Counts. During Ivan VII Frankopan's reign, a group of Romanians who later diverged into Istro-Romanians settled in the island and survived until 1875, when the last speaker of the Istro-Romanian dialect of Krk, which has been referred to as "Krko-Romanian" by some Croatian scholars, died.

== Sources ==
- Denis Lešić (2003). Otok Krk [The Island of Krk]. ISBN 953-7122-00-X.
- Damir Tulić. "Frankopani Knezovi Krčki 1115–1480" (PDF) (in Croatian).
