= Tržac, Cazin =

Tržac
- Village
- Location of Tržac (Cazin) within Bosnia and Herzegovina.

- Location within Bosnia and Herzegovina
- Coordinates: 45°02′02″N 15°47′18″E
- Country: Bosnia and Herzegovina
- Entity: Federation of Bosnia and Herzegovina
- Canton: Una-Sana
- Municipality: Cazin

Area
  - Total: 0.13 sq mi (0.33 km^{2})

Population (2013)
  - Total: 318
  - Density: 2,500/sq mi (960/km^{2})
- Time zone: UTC+1 (CET)
  - Summer (DST): UTC+2 (CEST)
- Area code: +387 37

Tržac is a village in the municipality of Cazin, Una-Sana Canton, Bosanska Krajina region, western Bosnia and Herzegovina.

== Geography ==
It is located close to the border with Croatia, lying on hillside terrain above the Korana river and its right tributary Mutnica. The climate is medium continental, with cold winters and warm summers.

== History ==
Throughout its history, Tržac appeared for the first time in the 11th century as a settlement in the central part of medieval Kingdom of Croatia. From the 13th century the village and its surrounding area (including Tržac Castle) were owned by members of the prominent Croatian Frankopan family, even giving the name to one of the family branches (Tržački). The Ottoman Empire under Hasan Predojević conquered it by the end of the 16th century, pushing the Croatian defenders to the west, and converting the local population to Islam thus populating the area with Muslim inhabitants. In the following centuries this area was called Turkish Croatia and finally renamed to Bosanska Krajina in the 19th century.

== Demographics ==
According to the 2013 census, its population was 318.

Ethnicity in 2013
Ethnicity	Number	Percentage
Bosniaks	308	96.9%
other/undeclared	10	3.1%
Total	318	100%

== See also ==
- Cazin
- Una-Sana Canton
- Frankopan family tree
