= Kurjaković family =

Croatian noble family

Kurjaković
- Croatian & Hungarian noble family
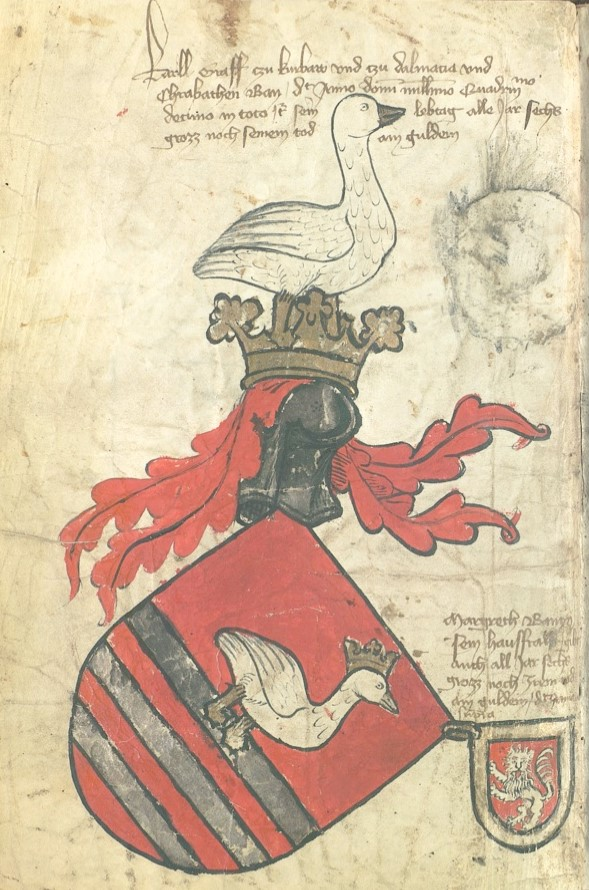
- Coat of arms from Wiener handschrift (1410)
- Parent house: Gusić
- Country: Vassal to Kingdom of Croatia (1102–1526); Vassal to Kingdom of Hungary (1102–1526)
- Founded: c. 1298
- Founder: Kurjak Gusić
- Final ruler: Ivan Karlović
- Seat: Udbina Castle
- Titles: Count, Ban, Master of the stewards, Master of the treasury, Master of the cupbearers, Court's Palatine
- Dissolution: 1531
- Cadet branches: Gradački, Zakanjski, Gračenički, Čekliški, Bužanski, Humljanski, Lički, Mrsinjski, Grof, Karlović

The Kurjaković family (de Coriach, de Curiaco, de Curiaci, Curiacovich), also known as the Counts of Krbava (comes de Corbavia, Hungarian: korbáviai grófok), were a Croatian noble family that originated from the noble tribe of Gusić. It formed at the end of the 13th century, as descendants of Kurjak. They reached their peak as magnates between mid-14th and mid-15th century, having tight connections and high official positions at the Hungarian royal court, and dissolution in 1531 when the estates of magnate Ivan Karlović went to Nikola III Zrinski. Two members were Ban of Croatia, as well two were founding members of Order of the Dragon.

== Coat of arms ==
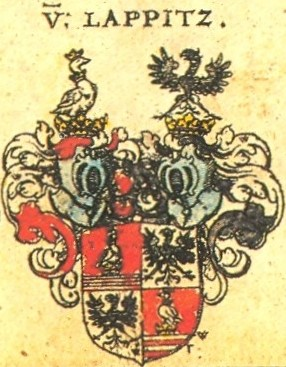
The Kurjaković (left) and Lapčan (right) joint coat of arms, from Siebmachers Wappenbuch in 1605.

Due to this marriage relationships, the coat of arms of both Kurjaković and Lapčan family by female line became part of the Austrian-Bavarian noble family of Sinzendorf. This happened by marriage of Ivan Lapčanin and Klara Torkvat Kurjaković, sister of Ivan Karlović, whose daughter Amalia de Lapitz married into Trauttmansdorff noble family, whose granddaughter Susanna married Pilgram II. von Sinzendorf. During the time of grand-grandson Georg Ludwig von Sinzendorf (1616–1681), by a 1648 decree of Ferdinand III, Holy Roman Emperor, the coat of arms of Kurjaković and Lapčan family got officially united and mostly in this form were used by the Sinzendorf's family on many portraits, engravings, and money coins.

== History ==
The branch's founder Kurjak was mentioned for the first time in 1298 as comes Curiacus de genere Gussich, whose descendants in the 14th century started calling themselves as "Kurjaković" (de Coriach, de Curiaco, Curiacovich). In 1334 regarded Slovinja as the predecessor of the Krbava's branch, but it is probably wrong. Kurjak's name could mean "wolf", be a variation of Kirijakos (Dominicus), with the latter supported by heraldry, or Cyriacus. It is unknown to which part of the Gusić's tribe he belonged. Kurjak tried in 1298 to deprive possessions of Gvid, Desina and Pribislav sons of Ladislav Gusić, but their possessions were returned by Paul I Šubić of Bribir, his cousin. Kurjak is mentioned for the last time in 1307, although already in 1304 is disputably mentioned as deceased. The genus branched by his sons Budislav, Pavle and Grgur, who during the 14th century were vassals of Paul and Mladen II Šubić of Bribir, and during Kurjak's lifetime they acquired Krbava županija as heirdom. Due to estates region, they were commonly known as comes de Corbavia. From the family of Budislav branched Čekliški, Bužanski, Humljanski, Lički, Mrsinjski named after the property, Grof, and Karlović after Karlo Kurjaković. About Pavle is little known except a certain individual was called Gradački, while Grgur's branch moved out of Krbava and after donated estates were called Zakanjski and Gračenički.

Between 1316 and 1322, during the time of several revolts between noble families of Šubić, Frankopan, Babonić, Nelipić, as well Stephen II, Ban of Bosnia and some Dalmatian coastal towns, they allied with Nelipić against Šubić from Bribir and others. The strategic alliance with voivode Nelipac lasted for three decades and even afterwards the families had close strategic and matrimonial connections. Budislav managed to be Podestà of Šibenik (1320–21). Although are not mentioned, they probably did participate at the Battle of Bliska (1322) against Mladen II Šubić of Bribir. At least since 1324, Grgur Kurjaković was in royal service, as knight of the court, župan of Fejér County and castellan of Hasznos. Between 1324–1326 they were successful allies of Ivan Nelipić who defended Knin Fortress, and with Juraj Mihovilović, cities of Šibenik and Trogir, against forces of George II Šubić of Bribir, Counts of Krk, city of Zadar, Stephen II, as well as Ban of Slavonia Mikac Mihaljević who was sent by King Charles I of Hungary to centralize royal authority. Their power at the time substantially rose, seen from being intermediaries between Republic of Venice, coastal cities, Nelipić and Šubić noblemen in 1332–1333, or 1337 when Pope Benedict XII asked them to help the investigation of heresy in Bosnia, and help Nelipić against Stephen II who supported the Bosnian Church. Since 1330 until 1360, led by Budislav and Grgur, they played a very complex policy of neutral alliance with conflicting Hungarian kings and the Republic of Venice. They only conventionally accepted the supreme authority of King Charles I, but it became official in 1345 after Louis I of Hungary temporary imprisoned Grgur. The alliance was particularly insisted upon by Venice, who was apologetic and even prevented Mladen III Šubić raiding and own generals attacking them. They, especially Grgur, were constantly active on repeated reconciliations between Louis I and Venice, and were even neutral in 1356–1358 when Louis I conquered Venetian holdings in Dalmatia resulting with Treaty of Zadar. However, because of that Grgur was imprisoned in Levice, with a part of his estate confiscated. His descendants would continue gathering foreign estates, but direct male line ended with Ladislav Zakanjski in the 15th century.

In 1382, Budislav's son Butko or Budislav swore in the name of all family relatives to fidelity to the queens Elizabeth and Mary. They, led by Butko, helped Sigismund in fighting against court conspiracy by John of Palisna, and restore from captivity Queen Mary in 1387, because of which Butko was named Court's Palatine. In the same year Butko, Toma, Pavao and Karlo were titled as Counts of Krbava, Lika, Bužani and Bag, while Karlo was named Queen's main messenger. Ivan of Nikola performed the duties of the Master of the Queen's and King's steward irregularly between 1388–1418. In 1400, Butko paid Hrvoje Vukčić Hrvatinić to not attack Pavao I Zrinski, whose sister Elizabeth I was married to Toma. Between 1401–1402, they tried to sell Bužane županija to Pavao I, but it was halted by King Sigismund. Due to their support to Sigismund, later crown pretender to the Hungarian-Croatian throne, Ladislaus of Naples took them away Ostrovica županija, fortress of Novigrad, and then all possessions giving to Sandalj Hranić Kosača between 1403–1406, but they maintained a very significant influence in the Hungarian-Croatian Kingdom. In 1408 became Master of the treasury, and with Ivan was among the founding members of Sigismund's Order of the Dragon. When became a Ban of Croatia (1409–1411), he was active during Venetians conquest of Dalmatia, trying to instigate a resistance of coastal cities against Venice. He fought around Ostrovica Fortress, Vrana, capturing Skradin. Since then, the Republic of Venice impeded regular traffic along the coast which negatively influenced their main seats at Obrovac and Karlobag.

In 1430, royal knight Karlo of Pavle, in the name of Ivánka, Juraj, Nikola, and Franko has founded with Ivaniš Nelipić a fraternitatem of Croatian nobility to defend the old customs and liberties of the Croatian kingdom. In 1441, Karlo with brother and royal knight Toma is mentioned regarding Ban's authority over their Vlachs. In the mid 15h century, Toma built fortress Ripač on the river Una in 1442, and his son Grgur fort Kličevac near Benkovac in 1453. However, besides dealing with Venetian and Hungarian interests, their activity and estates were in conflict with Frankopan's, and on the way of Ottoman Empire conquest. In 1454, Grgur of Toma entered the service of Ulrich II, Count of Celje, which was not welcomed by Venice, and the next year asked in vain for a truce and to be their mercenaries. In 1457, interested in Ostrovica Fortress, near which built a smaller one, Grgur plundered hinterland of the city of Zadar and warned about the danger of Ottomans, but Venetians ignored his warning. Due to conflicts with Frankopan's, in mid-1462 they imprisoned bishop Nicholas of Modruš and asked Pope Paul II to return the seat of Diocese from Modruš (1460) to Krbava or formation of own Diocese of Krbava, but they gave up on demand.

In the late 1460s, Venetians tried to reconcile Kurjaković and Frankopan families for defence against the Ottomans. Their estates then and 1472–1477 were raided by the Ottomans. In 1481, King Matthias Corvinus complained that the Venetians military helped Karlo Kurjaković. In 1490, he was in contact with Maximilian I, Holy Roman Emperor, 1491 with Ban Ladislaus Egervári defeated Ottomans at Una River, opposed the coronation of Vladislaus II of Hungary, and in 1493 besieged Senj with Ivan VIII (Anž) Frankopan, while Obrovac in Venetian rule by his own. Karlo died before or during the devastating Battle of Krbava Field (1493), when Ban Emerik Derenčin and others were captured and killed by Ottoman forces. In 1494, Karlo's widow Dorothea Frankopan probably paid a yearly tribute to the Ottomans. Their son, Ivan Karlović who was the Ban of Croatia between 1521–1524 and 1527–1531, was the last male descendant of the family. He was present at the Election in Cetin (1527) when Croatian nobles elected Ferdinand I Habsburg as new King of Croatia. By inheritance contract from 1509 with Nikola III Zrinski, who married his sister Jelena, the vast estates went to the Zrinski family.

== Estates and status ==
Besides Krbava županija where they built Kurjak-grad, their initial seat was in Turan, then in Počitelj and Komić, and in the 15th century in Krbava (Udbina). By marriage, they got fortress of Zvonigrad near Knin, and Obrovac near river Zrmanja, which was important for the control of trade routes between Lika and Dalmatia. By mid-15th century they spread influence over župa of Hum, Nebljuh, Bužane, Odorje, Hotuča, Luka, and Lika. They also built and had a fort Mrsinj-grad on the hill above Korenica, Prozor above Vrelo Koreničko and several others. By fortification of Zelengrad, Kličevac and Otavac in the 15th century they controlled upper Bukovica and central part of the županija of Luka. From there got estates around Nin, Zadar and Novigrad district, and had houses in Zadar. The coastal city of Bag (Karlobag), which governed since 1324 and initially divided with count Petar Disislavić, was used as an important trade port and when they lost it in 1481, Karlo III even negotiated with the Ottomans. In the interior, Lika was completely controlled only since 1505 when its forts were conquered by Ivan Karlović. They also had some forts in the area of Pounje, where were stationed the last forces when Krbava fell to the Ottomans until Karlović's death in Medvedgrad (1531). At the time, Karlović had 22 forts and cities in three županijas and two župas, of which most prominent were Udbina, Krbava, Kurjak-grad, Turan, Počitelj, Podlapčec (Podlapac), Mrsinj-grad, Lovinac, Gradac (Gračac), Novigrad, Zvonigrad, Zelengrad, Kličevac (Kličevica), Bag, Obrovac and Stari Obrovac.

Specifically, the branch of Budislav of Kurjak which predominantly stayed in the county of Krbava until its dissolution, at the time of his grandson Karlo II, castellan of Visegrád and Ban of Croatia, also lived in Upper Hungary. From 1393, he governed over Fort Bernolákovo estate as well had a house in Bratislava. Subsequent descendants acquired Castle Dobrá Niva, Ľupča Castle, and Brezno, which were taken away by John Corvinus. As for the branch of Grgur of Kurjak, they immediately permanently emigrated from Krbava. They as castellans served at Dobra Kuća in Slavonia, Rašpor near Buzet in Istria, Klis in Croatia, then Greben, Kozar and Mrin on the boundary between Slavonia and Kingdom of Bosnia, while with trade business with the Republic of Venice and political connections in Hungary managed to get Zákány in Somogy County and Gračenica district of Bjelovar-Križevci County, because of which were called as Zakanjski and Gračenički.

The counts continuously supported the Hungarian King's and Queen's, with the exception of Grgur I and Pavle I at the very beginning. Seemingly the family members supported each other to climb on higher in status, like when Butko, who was a Vice-Ban, helped relatives Karlo II and Ivan II to get a function on the royal court. They were among the first in Croatian nobility to build close connections with Hungary, as well as first among the Croatian nobles to have the title of knight of the court, function of Queen's Master of the court (magister curiae, possibly Judge royal), Master of the Queen's and King's steward, Master of the treasury, Queen's Master of the cupbearers, Court's Palatine, and so on. They also were the breeders of racial horses which sold in Dubrovnik, the guardians of Holy Crown of Hungary, members of the first class of the Dragon Order, and the Roman confraternity of the Holy Spirit.

== Genealogy ==
- Kurjak Gusić (Latin: Curiaco de genere Gussich, fl. 1298–1304/1307), Count of Krbava.
  - Budislav (fl. 1304–1346), Count of Krbava, served the Šubić family until 1322, when revolted and allied with the Nelipić family.
    - Salamun (fl. 1312)
    - Butko Kurjaković (fl. 1377–dec. 1401), Count of Krbava, for help in saving Queen Mary named by her Court's Palatine in 1387, and possibly was Ban of Croatia between 1393 and 1394.
      - Petar (fl. 1401–1411)
      - Franko (fl. 1401–1436), among the nobles who accompanied King Sigismund at the Council of Constance (1414).
      - Daughter (fl. 1390)
    - Toma (fl. 1364–dec. 1401), m. Elizabeta I Zrinski.
    - Nikola (fl. 1364–1388)
      - Ivan (fl. 1388–1418), Master of the Queen's and King's steward irregularly between 1388–1418.
        - Marija (fl. 1431–1434), m. Šimun son of Marko Kladuški.
        - Katarina (fl. 1434), m. Dezső Bánfi
      - Ana (fl. 1431–1434), m. Baboneg Babonić Blagajski.
      - Magdalena (fl. 1431–1434), m. Marko Kladuški.
      - Marija (fl. 1434), m. Vukmir Zlatonosović.
    - Fredul (fl. 1364)
    - Karlo (fl. 1364–dec. 1377)
      - Pavao (fl. 1364–1402)
        - Karlo (fl. 1402–1453), m. Margareta Nelipić, royal knight.
          - Pavao (fl. 1451–1469),
          - Karlo (fl. 1451–dec. 1493), m. Dorothea Frankopan.
            - Bernardin (fl. 1485)
            - Ivan Karlović Torquatus (1478–dec. 1531), Ban of Croatia (1521–1524, 1527–1531), last direct male descendant.
            - Katarina (1498), m. Berbard Da Lezze.
            - Uršula, a nun in Dominican Monastery of St. Demetrije in Zadar.
            - Jelena (fl. 1507–1535), m. Juraj II Kaštelanović (1) Nikola III Zrinski (2), Maid of honour.
            - Klara (fl. dec. 1541), m. Ivan Lapčanin.
        - Toma (fl. 1402–1460), royal knight, witness and Vice-Ban (1435), count of Hum and Nebljuhi (1447).
          - Ivan (fl. 1446–1493), m. Katarina Újlaki.
          - Grgur (fl. 1446–1468), served Ulrich II, Count of Celje.
          - Jelena (fl. 1439–1449), m. János Bánfi.
    - Grgur (fl. 1360–1364), m. Ana, worked on legal affairs with Queen Elizabeth of Bosnia in Zadar.
      - Karlo (fl. 1364–dec. 1422), m. Katarina Hrvatinić (1) Margarita (2), received fort Čekliš in 1393 from King Sigismund, secular administrator of Roman Catholic Diocese of Vác (1405), Master of the treasury (1408), Ban of Croatia (1409–1411), permanent member of the supreme royal court (1417).
        - Juraj (fl. 1414–1439), m. Agata Zrinski, King's agent and witness (1426), župan of Zólyom County (1427–1430), official of Queen Barbara of Cilli (1427–1430), received fort Tátika in Zala County (1435), Queen's Master of the court (1439).
          - Pavao (fl. 1442), owner of Castle Dobrá Niva.
            - Grgur (fl. 1468), lord of Mrsinj-grad.
              - Nikola (fl. 1486–1489)
                - Petar (fl. 1486–early 16th century), lord of Mrsinj-grad.
                - Juraj (fl. 1486–1509), lord of Ľupča Castle, present in the Hungarian parliament (1504), and was King's envoy (1504–1507).
                - Nikola (fl. 1486–1489)
          - Nikola (fl. 1442–1450), owner of Castle Dobrá Niva.
        - Ivanka (1430–1439), received fort Tátika in Zala County (1435), Queen's Master of the court and envoy (1434), castellan of Solymár (1438).
          - Grgur (fl. 1441–1461), m. Sofija Necpaly, captain of Ľupča Castle (1441–1460).
            - Kristofor (fl. 1460)
  - Grgur (fl. 1324–1360), Count of Krbava with brother Budislav, knight of the royal court with estates in Hungary.
    - Juraj (fl. 1352–1390), m. Elizabeth, castellan of Dobra Kuća (1352–1356, in pledge, received fort Rašpor in Istria from Meinhard VI of Gorizia (1358), envoy to Louis I, Duke of Orléans fiancé of Mary, Queen of Hungary (1385), envoy of King Tvrtko I of Bosnia to Split.
      - Grgur (fl. 1391–1413), m. Katarina Garai, Count of Garešnica.
    - Budislav (fl. 1379), m. Elizabeth, gifted Zákány in Somogy County by King Louis I.
      - Nikola Zakanjski (fl. 1380–1413), participated at Battle of Nicopolis (1396), had estates in Kakonya, Zenthtrinitas, Legrad, and Derze.
        - Katarina, m. Imre Szerdahelyi
        - Ladislav (fl. 1436)
          - Uršula (fl. 1436)
          - Jelena (fl. 1436)
          - Nesta (fl. 1436)
  - Pavao (dec. 1340)
    - Budislav (fl. 1364)
      - Nikola (fl. 1378), m. Ana Báthory.
        - Juraj (fl. 1393),
        - Katarina (fl. 1393), m. Andrew Liszkói from branch of Szente-Mágócs clan.
    - Ivan (fl. 1364)
    - Dujam (fl. 1364)
    - Grgur (fl. 1364)
  - Jelena (fl. 1344–1350), married Vukoslav Hrvatinić.
  - Vladislava (fl. 1326–1346), married Ivan Nelipić.

== See also ==
- Croatian nobility
- List of noble families of Croatia
- Twelve noble tribes of Croatia
- Udbina Castle
