= Battle of Belaj =

- Part of the Ottoman wars in Europe; Ottoman–Croatian Wars
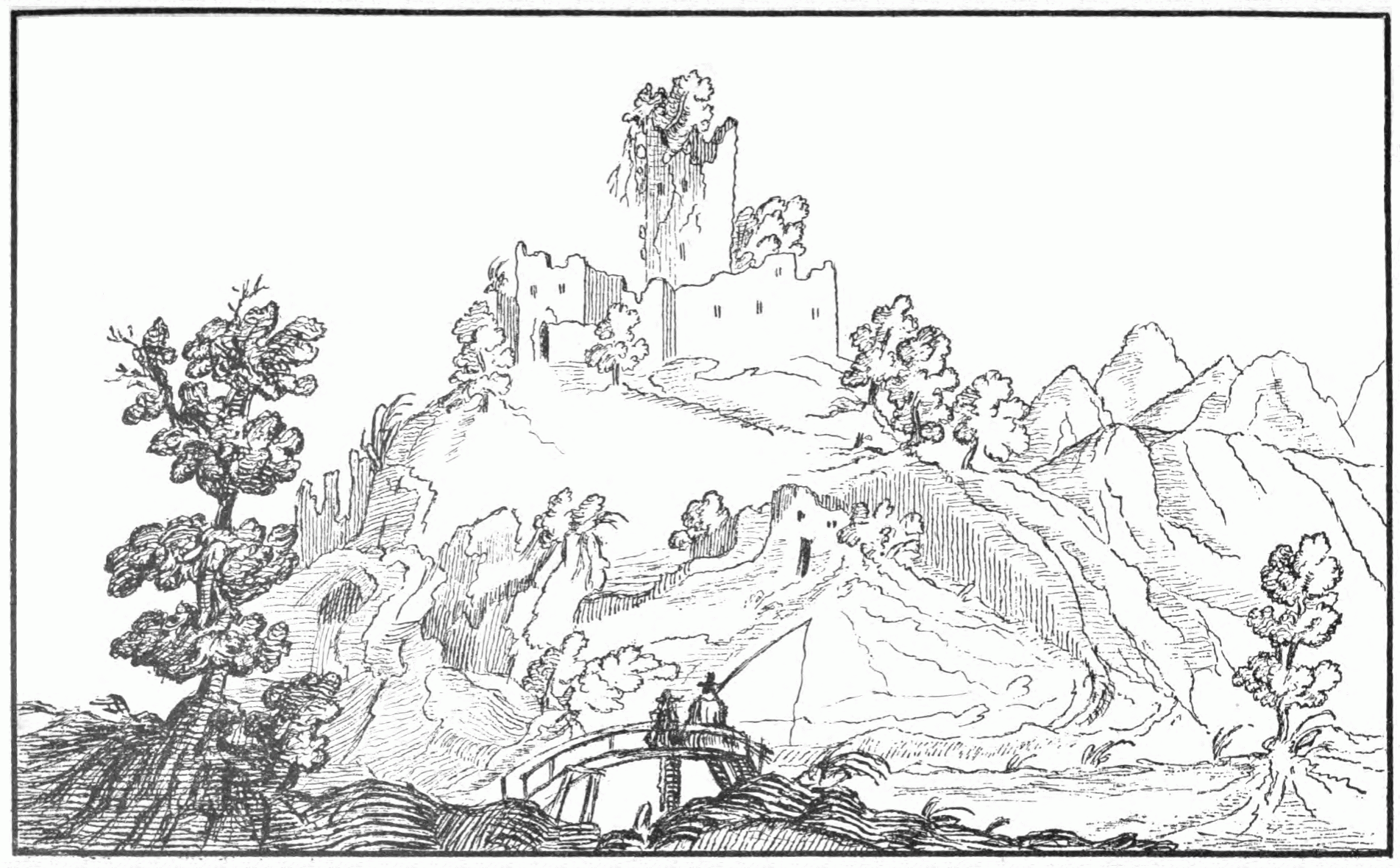
- Remains of Belaj castle on 1639 sketch
Date	4 October 1528
Location	near Belaj (present day Barilović), Kingdom of Croatia, Habsburg monarchy
Result	Christian victory

Belligerents
Ottoman Empire	Habsburg Monarchy: Kingdom of Croatia; Duchy of Styria; Duchy of Carniola

Commanders and leaders
Gazi Husrev Bey unnamed governor of Sanjak of Herzegovina †; Skender, vice pasha of Bosnia (WIA)	Bernardin Ričan; Ivan Karlović (WIA); Vuk Frankopan; Kristofor Frankopan

Strength
5,000 men	5,000 men

Casualties and losses
700	Unknown

Battle of Belaj was a battle between Ottoman army returning from their raid on Carniola and Croatia. It took place on 4 October 1528 under the castle of Belaj, in modern-day village of Barilović in Croatia.

== Prelude ==
In 1528, the Ottoman governor of sanjak bey of Bosnia Gazi Husrev Bey decided to launch series of raids on Carniola and Croatia. Slavonian nobleman Ivan Tahy, decided to retaliate by launching his own raids to Bosnia, during which he burnt down Kotor Varoš on Vrbanja river along with its outlying villages and plundered many people and cattle.

In response, Husrev bey in October decided to go to another raid on Croatia and Carniola. According to reports written by Petar Kružić from Senj to vicecaptain of Rijeka, the large Ottoman army reached Otočac by October 2 and continued their incursion towards Metlika. In his letter, Kružić also asked the men to spread the word about the presence of the Ottoman army. As Croatian and Carniolan nobility became aware of this, they assembled their own armies and the two armies eventually met each other near the castle of Belaj.

== Battle ==
Croatian historian Vjekoslav Klaić writes that the battle took place in the afternoon. The exact accounts of the battle differ in some details, however both Vjekoslav Klaić and Petar Grgec agree that battle lasted for two hours. According to Petar Grgec, the Ottoman commander Gazi Husrev Bey placed his most able men in the first rows. As battle started, it appeared that the Ottomans were gaining the upper hand since Germans in Christian ranks started to lose their faith. Grgec claims that they were stopped by ban of Croatia, Ivan Karlović, who then charged back onto the Turks and broke their ranks, causing them to flee. Klaić claims that the Turks were routed as night started to fall.

=== The role of Ivan Karlović ===
According historians Vjekoslav Klaić and Radoslav Lopašić, ban of Croatia Ivan Karlović was severely wounded in the battle by German soldiers who mistakened him for high-ranking Ottoman officer. Klaić claims that Karlović's rivals accused him for wanting to flee so Germans wounded him, but he also claims that Carniolan reports speak of Karlović's heroic chivalry and commend his valour for the emperor Ferdinand. Petar Grgec on the other hand, claims that the battle was "Karlović's most heroic moment" of his second mandate on position of ban of Croatia and that Klaić misinterpreted the text written by Venetian historian Sanuto which actually says that Karlović received 18 wounds while trying to stop Germans from fleeing the battlefield. Nonetheless, all sources agree that Karlović took 18 wounds in combat and that it was German soldiers who inflicted them.

== Aftermath ==
As the Ottomans fled the battlefield, some 700 dead and wounded Ottoman soldiers were lying dead or wounded on field of Belaj. Among them were also Bosnian pasha and captain of Udbina, who were severely wounded. On the Christian side, Ivan Karlović was also severely wounded. According to the letter written on 18 October, Karlović was still recovering from his wounds and it was "unknown whether he will remain alive or die". Karlović, eventually managed to recover.
