= Ivan Karlović =

Ban of Croatia

Ban of Croatia
- In office 1521–1524
- Preceded by: Petar Berislavić
- Succeeded by: Janos Tahy
- In office 1527–1531
- Preceded by: Ferenc Batthyány
- Succeeded by: Simeon Erdődy

Personal details
- Born: 1485 Udbina, Kingdom of Croatia
- Died: 9 August 1531 (aged 45–46) Medvedgrad, Kingdom of Croatia, Habsburg monarchy
- Resting place: Church of the Assumption of the Blessed Virgin Mary in Remete, Zagreb, Croatia
- Spouse: unnamed niece of Esztergom cardinal Tamás Bakócz
- Parent: Doroteja Frankopan (mother) Karlo Kurjaković (father)
- Nickname: Torquatus

Military service
- Allegiance: Kingdom of Hungary Republic of Venice Habsburg monarchy
- Battles/wars: Battle of Gračac (1500) Battle of Dubica (1513) Battle of Belaj

Ivan Karlović (c. 1485 – 9 August 1531), also known as by his Latin name Johannes Torquatus, was the Count of Krbava. His life during critical periods of Hundred Years' Croatian–Ottoman War was marked by constant efforts to stop Ottoman conquests of Croatia, during which he held position of Ban of Croatia twice: from 1521 to 1524 and again from 1527 to 1531. He was also one of the Croatian magnates who participated in 1527 Election in Cetin.

He was the last male descendant of the Kurjaković family from the noble tribe of Gusić, and after his death the estates were passed on to Nikola III Zrinski who married his sister Jelena Kurjaković. Karlović is also remembered in the folk poetry of Molise Croats.

== Early life ==
Ivan was born c. 1485 in Udbina, as the son of Karlo Kurjaković, and Dorothea Frankopan. After his father's death in 1493, he inherited vast estates of the family, including županijas Krbava, Odorje, Hotuča, Lapac, part of Lika and several fortified cities in near županijas, as well the title of the Count of Krbava. During his lifetime, in a similar fashion to other Croatian and European noblemen, he had an anachronistic tendency to trace his family ancestry to Roman patricians. In his case, to Titus Manlius Imperiosus Torquatus, a thesis which was also wrongly argued by Miklós Istvánffy and Pavao Ritter Vitezović,. He and his sister Klara therefore named themselves as "Torkvat".

== History ==
At the time, his estates were on the first front of the Ottoman Empire expansion. In struggle against the Ottomans, he tried to rely on the help of: Hungarian-Croatian King, the House of Habsburg, Republic of Venice (by serving as their Condottiero) or even agreements of paying tribute with the Ottomans in 1506 and 1511. In 1500, he defeated Ottoman army near Gradac (today Gračac). In the Hungarian succession crisis, he supported Maximilian I, Holy Roman Emperor against Hungarian-Croatian King Vladislaus II of Hungary in 1506. Between 1505 and 1509 he owned town Mutnik and market town Belaj (today village Bilaj near Gospić). In 1508, he temporary fought against Maximilian I's army in the hinterland of Venice, when on return he successfully defended Mutnik from Croatian noblemen, and was possibly helped by the Ottoman forces. Between 1509 and 1524, he made several Condottieri contracts with Venice to defend the Republic's estates in Dalmatia. In 1510, refused to be one the military commanders in a campaign to free Dalmatia from Venetian authority, but due to lack of finances the war did not happen.

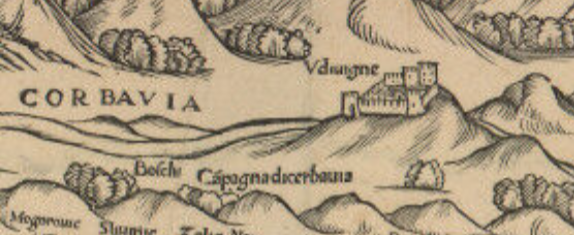
Udbina castle, Karlović's seat. A depiction from Venetian map, made around 1530

In 1513, as Vice-Ban and Captain of Croatia and Dalmatia (1512–1513), along with Petar Berislavić, then Ban of Croatia, and other noblemen he participated in the Battle of Dubica. However, in 1514 the Ottomans raided his estates in Krbava and Lika, as well fought against him in Bosnia. In 1517 and mid-1520s, as the situation for him was becoming ever more desperate, he tried to replace his fortified estates with others in Lombardy under Venetian authority. However, he was rejected with only a promise of financial help. In 1519, Stjepan Posedarski, a humanist, chaplain and envoy of Karlović from the Posedarski branch of the Gusić tribe, in the name of Karlović delivered the anti-Ottoman speech Oratio Stephani Possedarski habita apud Leonem decimum pontificem maximum pro domino Ioanne Torquato comite Corbauie defensore Crouacie to Pope Leo X. In it, Karlović was represented as a true defender of his and other lands, in the name of faith, freedom, and survival, who was losing faith in defending the Holy Church and was asking for help. The speech was noted in the West but had little success. In 1520, as Petar Berislavić got killed in fight against the Ottomans in Plješivica mountain, Karlović was informed by Berislavić's surviving soldiers about Berislavić's death. Upon learning this in Udbina, Karlović assembled his men and went to Plješivica, where they managed to find late ban's severed head and decapitated body. His remains were then taken to nearby Bihać and subsequently to Veszprem.

In 1521, in the name of a group of Croatian nobility, he unsuccessfully attempted to negotiate with the Ottomans. In the same year was named as Ban of Croatia, Slavonia, and Dalmatia. He was trying to organize a defense against the Ottomans and decided to only engage in field battles as could not get support for the defense of royal towns. In that sense, he was not able to prevent the fall of Knin, fall of Skradin and Ostrovica Fortress. He regularly received military and financial aid from Archduke Ferdinand I, but not from his real monarch Hungarian-Croatian King Louis II. As he steadily impoverished due to permanent warfare and noblemen did not accept new taxes in order to the increase revenues in 1523, he resigned from the position of Ban in 1524.

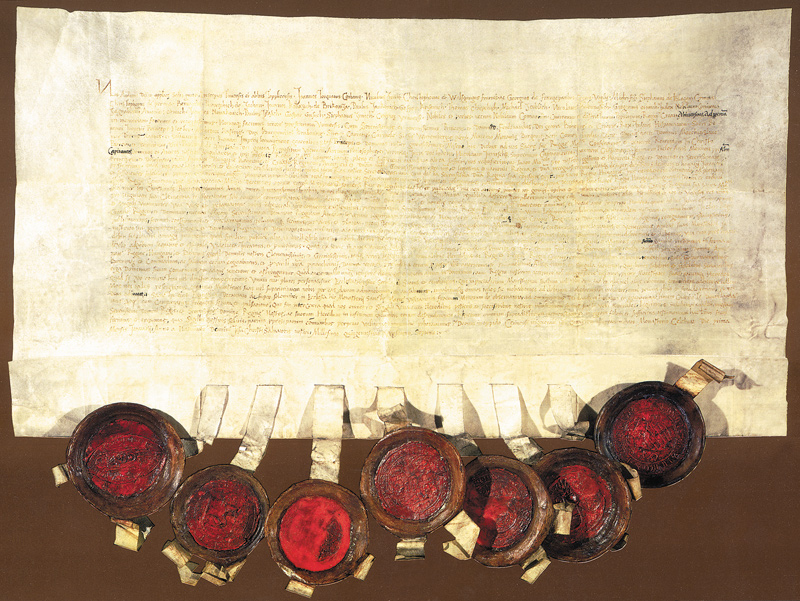
Cetin Charter (1527), with the second seal from left belonging to Karlović.

In December 1526, he took part in Croatian Election in Cetin along with several other most important Croatian noble magnates. There, on 1 January 1527 Croatian nobility signed a charter by which they elected Ferdinand I from the House of Habsburg for a new King of Croatia, as they regarded him the only possible option which could help Croatians defend against the Ottoman invasions. The election was part of a succession crisis and civil war as lower nobility in Hungary and Slavonia chose to support John Zápolya. Karlović mostly remained neutral during the war, and after the death of Christoph Frankopan, he attempted to reconcile the former conflicting parties in 1530.

In 1527, along Ferenc Batthyány, was again appointed Ban of Croatia, Slavonia, and Dalmatia, which he remained until his death in 1531. As Ottomans conquered his forts of Obrovac, Udbina, Komić, and Mrsinj-grad, he received substitute estates of Medvedgrad, Lukavec and Rakovec in Turopolje from Ferdinand I. In 1528, near Belaj he commanded Croatian army with reinforced by Carniolan forces, which defeated several thousand Ottoman troops preparing to raid Carniola. In the next year, he led Croatian forces to help at 1529 Siege of Vienna.

== Death ==
Ivan Karlović died on 9 August 1531, in Medvedgrad. He was placed to rest in the Church of the Assumption of the Blessed Virgin Mary in Remete, Zagreb, under the great altar. As he did not have any descendants in marriage with the niece of cardinal Tamás Bakócz, according to the inheritance contract with Nikola III Zrinski from 1509, who married his sister Jelena Kurjaković, the estates were inherited by Zrinski family. At the time, Karlović had 22 forts and cities in three županijas and two župas. The most prominent of those were Udbina, Krbava, Kurjak-grad, Turan, Počitelj, Podlapčec (Podlapac), Mrsinj-grad, Lovinac, Gradac (Gračac), Novigrad, Zvonigrad, Zelengrad, Kličevac (Kličevica), Bag, Obrovac and Stari Obrovac.

His sister Jelena was mother of the future Ban of Croatia and Szigetvár hero, Nikola IV Zrinski. Karlović nephews Nikola and Ivan Zrinski in 1541 arranged to carve the inscription on his tombstone, saying "Sepultus genere Spectabilis militiaque praeditus magnificus dominus Torquatus, comes Corbaviae regnorumque Croatiae et Sclavoniae banus mole sub hac tegitur". This inscription, along with the coat of arms got lost over the centuries. In a 16th century Glagolithic document about his seal and coats of arms, described it to depict a goose on a shield, above them letters I. C., meaning Joannes Caroli. In 1736, Hungarian polymath Samuel Timon described the alleged coat of arms on the tombstone, and according to it, in 1802 Károly Wagner described the color, but they were inspired by 17th-century armorials like Opus Insignium Armorumque (1687–1688) by Johann Weikhard von Valvasor.

== Legacy ==
In the folk tradition, the fortified towns in ruin like Komić, Kozja Draga, and Mazin are still called as Karlovića dvori ("Karlović's palaces"). Karlović is the main character of the novel Ivan Hrvaćanin (1926) by Fran Binički.

=== Folk poetry ===
Karlović is also remembered in the folk poetry including bugarštica (for example Kad se Ivan Karlović vjerio za kćer kralja Budimskoga), and of the Molise Croats in Southern Italy, Burgenland Croats in Austria, and Bosniaks, probably the descendants of his former subjects. He is mentioned as Ivan or Jivan Karlović, Ive Karlovićev, Ivan Dovice, did Karlović, Karlo Vića, and Ivan Hrvaćanin. In Molise are preserved several fragmented variations of an old song in Shtokavian-Chakavian with Ikavian accent, while longer variation can be found in Chakavian with Ekavian-Ikavian accent.

He is generally featured as a noble and good master, tireless warrior against the Ottomans. On the other hand, in Molise has a negative connotation, depicted as being feared by girls picking flowers in a meadow. The story about girls being feared of intercourse with heroes is a common folk theme where heroes identity is less significant as the songs were preserved and performed in wedding customs. There his true identity was forgotten and possibly was related to the fear and danger during the Ottomans conquest, but his mention is indicative for the date of migration and ethnic identity of the community in Molise.

=== Comparison with Job ===
Due to the fact that he lost most of his personal holdings in defending Croatia, as well as inscription on his tombstone which quoted the biblical Book of Job, he is sometimes called "Job of Croatia".

== See also ==
- Croatian nobility
- List of noble families of Croatia
- Twelve noble tribes of Croatia

Preceded by Petar Berislavić	Ban of Croatia; 1521–1524	Succeeded by Janos Tahy
Preceded by Ferenc Batthyány	Ban of Croatia; 1527–1531	Succeeded by Simeon Erdődy
