= Kingdom of Croatia (Habsburg) =

Division of the Habsburg Monarchy

Kingdom of Croatia Kraljevina Hrvatska (Croatian) Regnum Croatiae (Latin) Horvát Királyság (Hungarian) Königreich Kroatien (German)
- 1527–1868
- Flag variants Top (1848–1852; 1860–1868); Bottom (1852–1860) Coat of arms (by H. G. Ströhl) Coat of arms (Fojnica Armorial)
- Anthem: Carevka
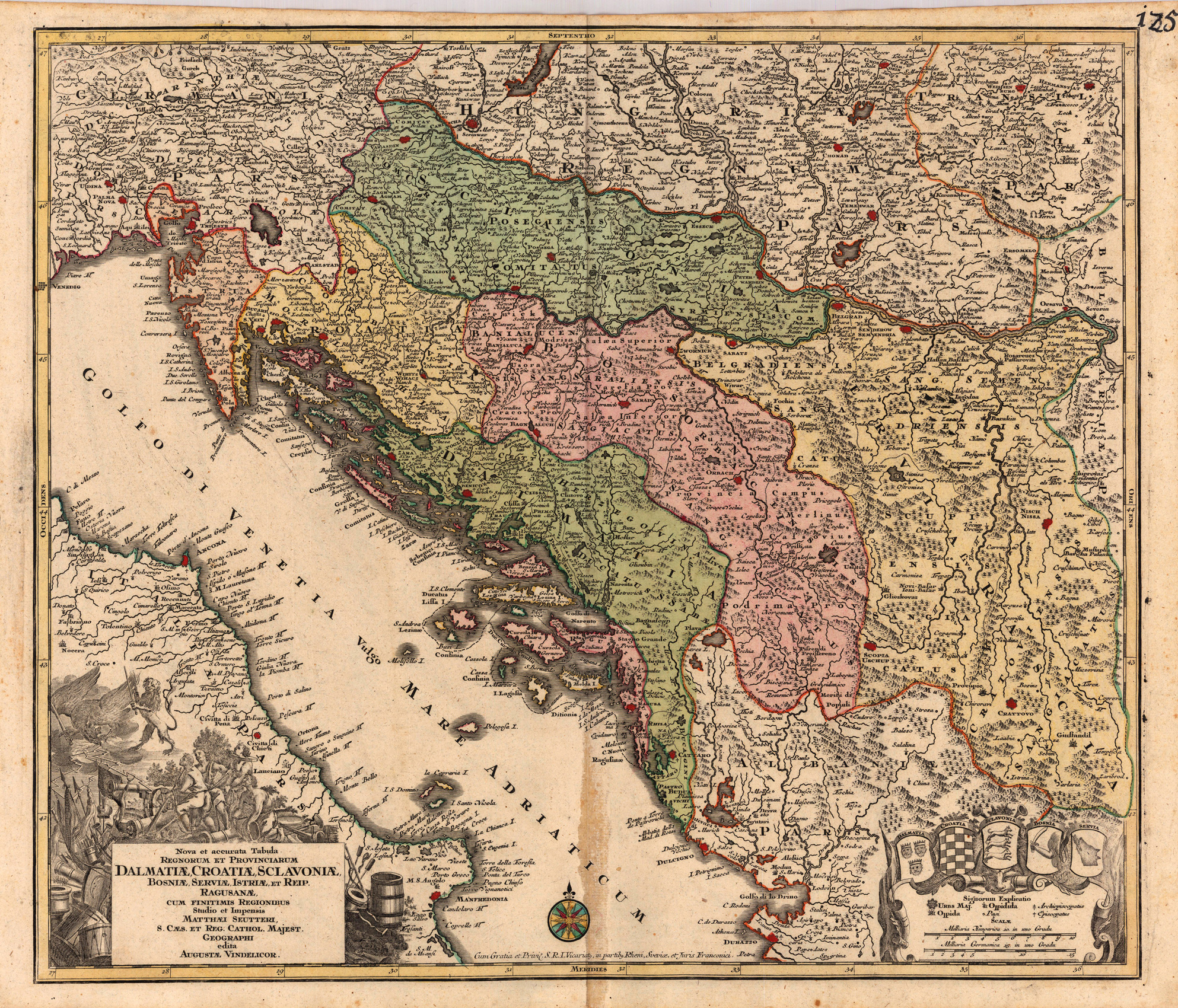
- Map of Croatia, Dalmatia, Slavonia, Bosnia, Serbia, Istria and the Republic of Ragusa in the 18th century
- Status: In personal union with Kingdom of Hungary (within Habsburg monarchy, Austrian Empire and Austria-Hungary)
- Capital: Zagreb (1557–1756); Varaždin (1756–1776); Zagreb (1776–1868)
- Common languages: Official: Latin (until 1784; 1790–1847); German (1784–1790); Croatian (1847–1868)
- Religion: Catholic Church
- Demonym: Croats
- Government: Monarchy
- King
  - 1527–1564 (first): Ferdinand I
  - 1848–1868 (last): Franz Joseph I
- Ban
  - 1527–1531 (first): Ivan Karlović
  - 1867–1868 (last): Levin Rauch de Nyék
- Legislature: Sabor
- Historical era: Early Modern period
  - Election of Ferdinand I: 1 January 1527
  - Treaty of Karlowitz: 26 January 1699
  - Pragmatic Sanction: 11 March 1712
  - Hungarian Revolution: 15 March 1848
  - 1867 Compromise: 30 March 1867
  - 1868 Settlement: 26 September 1868
- Currency: Florin
Preceded by	Succeeded by
Kingdom of Croatia	Kingdom of Croatia-Slavonia; City of Fiume
- Today part of: Croatia; Bosnia and Herzegovina

The Kingdom of Croatia (Note: (Croatian: Kraljevina Hrvatska; Latin: Regnum Croatiae; Hungarian: Horvát Királyság, German: Königreich Kroatien)) was part of the Lands of the Hungarian Crown, but was subject to direct Imperial Austrian rule for significant periods of time, including its final years. Its capital was Zagreb. It was also a part of the lands of the Habsburg monarchy from 1527, following the Election in Cetin, and the Austrian Empire from 1804 to 1867.

The Kingdom of Croatia had large territorial losses in wars with the Ottoman Empire in the 16th century. Until the 18th century, the kingdom included only a small north-western part of present-day Croatia around Zagreb, and a small strip of coastland around Rijeka, that were not part of the Ottoman Empire or part of the Croatian Military Frontier. Between 1744 and 1868, the Kingdom of Croatia included a subordinate autonomous kingdom, the Kingdom of Slavonia. The territory of the Slavonian kingdom was recovered from the Ottoman Empire, and was subsequently part of the Military Frontier for a short period. In 1744, these territories were organized as the Kingdom of Slavonia and included within the Kingdom of Croatia as an autonomous part. In 1868, they were merged into the newly formed Kingdom of Croatia-Slavonia.

== History and government ==
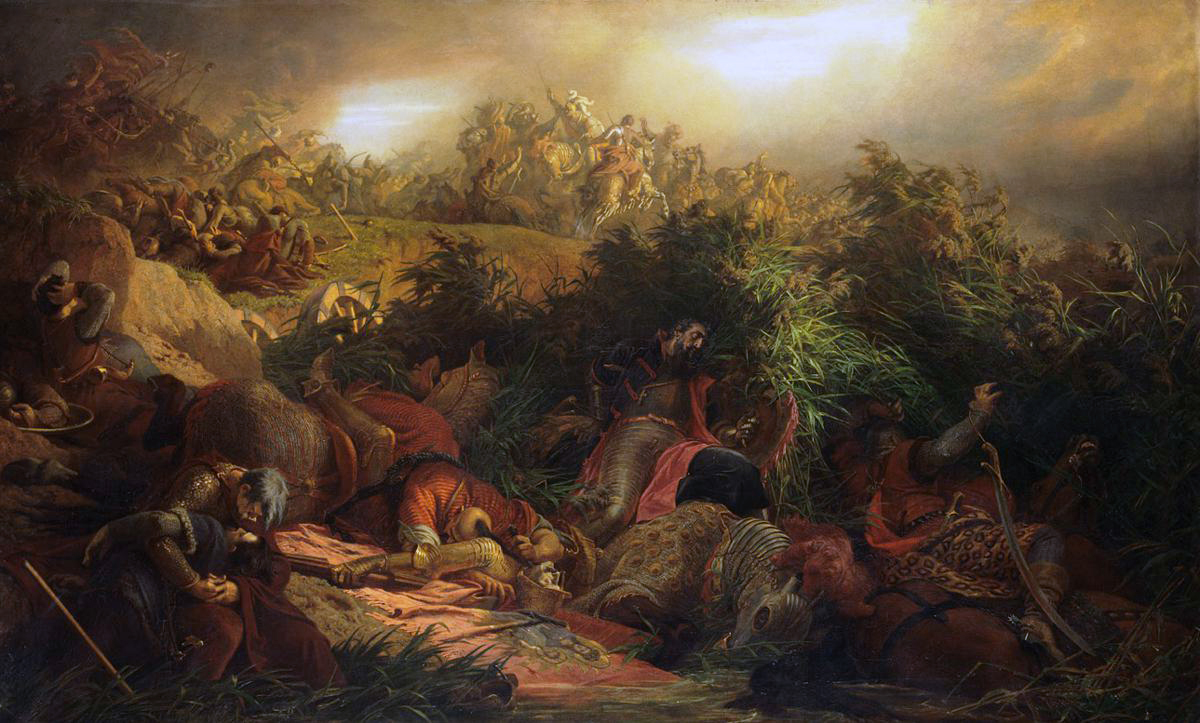
Battle of Mohács 1526 by Bertalan Székely

=== Habsburg rule ===
Following the fall of the medieval Kingdom of Hungary at the Battle of Mohács, in 1527 the Croatian and Hungarian nobles needed to decide on a new king. The bulk of the Croatian nobility convened the Croatian Parliament in Cetin and chose to join the Habsburg monarchy under the Austrian king Ferdinand I of Habsburg. Some nobles dissented and supported John Zápolya, but the Habsburg option fully prevailed in 1540, when John Zápolya died.

Territory recovered by the Austrians from the Ottoman Empire was formed in 1745 as the Kingdom of Slavonia, subordinate to the Croatian Kingdom. In 1804 the Habsburg monarchy became the Austrian Empire which annexed the Venetian Republic in 1814 and established the Kingdom of Dalmatia. After the Austro-Hungarian Compromise of 1867 (by which the Austrian Empire became the Austro-Hungarian Empire) and the Croatian–Hungarian Settlement (Nagodba) of 1868, the Kingdom of Croatia and Kingdom of Slavonia were joined to create the Kingdom of Croatia-Slavonia within the Hungarian part of the empire, while the Kingdom of Dalmatia remained a crown land in the Austrian part of the empire.

=== Croatian-Ottoman Wars ===
The change of leadership was far from a solution to the war with the Ottomans, in fact, the Ottoman Empire gradually expanded in the 16th century to include most of Slavonia, western Bosnia and Lika. After many battles against the Turkish invaders in which Croatian troops participated (Battle of Gorjani, Siege of Klis, Siege of Krupa, Battle of Belaj, Siege of Kőszeg, Battle of Otočac etc.), Croatian territory under Habsburg rule was 25 years later reduced to about 20,000 km^{2} (7,700 sq mi). In 1558, the parliaments of Croatia and Slavonia were united after many centuries into one. The centre of the Croatian state moved northward from coastal Dalmatia, as these lands were conquered by the Ottomans. The town of Zagreb gained importance, as did nearby Varaždin.

Taking advantage of the growing conflict between King Sigismund II of Poland and Maximilian II, Holy Roman Emperor, Suleiman the Magnificent started his sixth raid of Hungary in 1565 with 100,000 troops. They successfully progressed northwards until 1566 when they took a small detour to capture the outpost of Siget (Szigetvár) which they failed to capture ten years previously. The small fort was defended by Count Nikola IV Zrinski and 2,300–3,000 men. They were able to hold their ground for a month, and decimated the Ottoman army before being wiped out themselves. This siege, now known as the Battle of Szigetvár, bought enough time to allow Austrian troops to regroup before the Ottomans could reach Vienna.

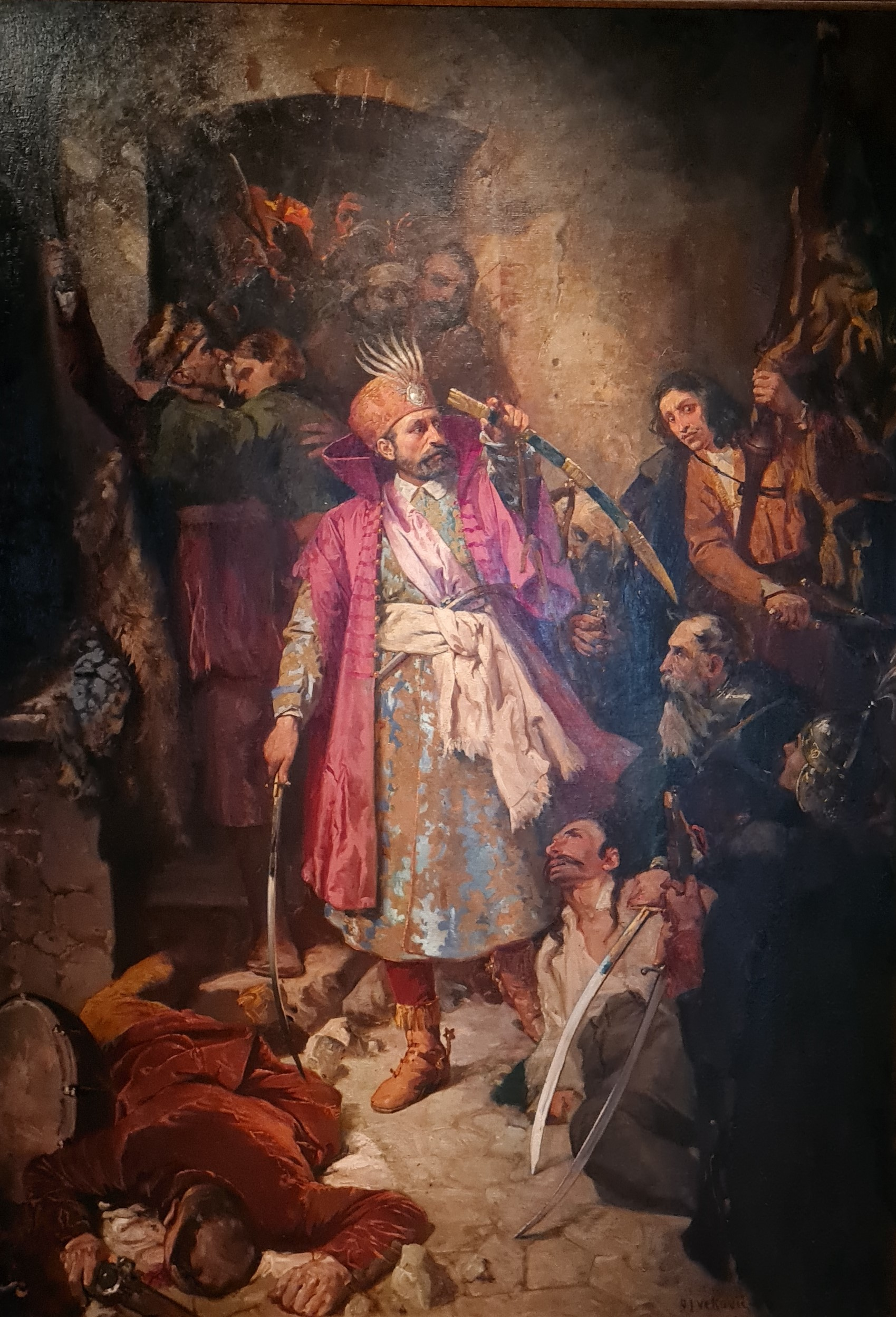
Nikola Šubić Zrinski by Oton Iveković. The work depicts Croatian Ban Nikola IV Zrinski defending against the Ottomans at the Battle of Szigetvár

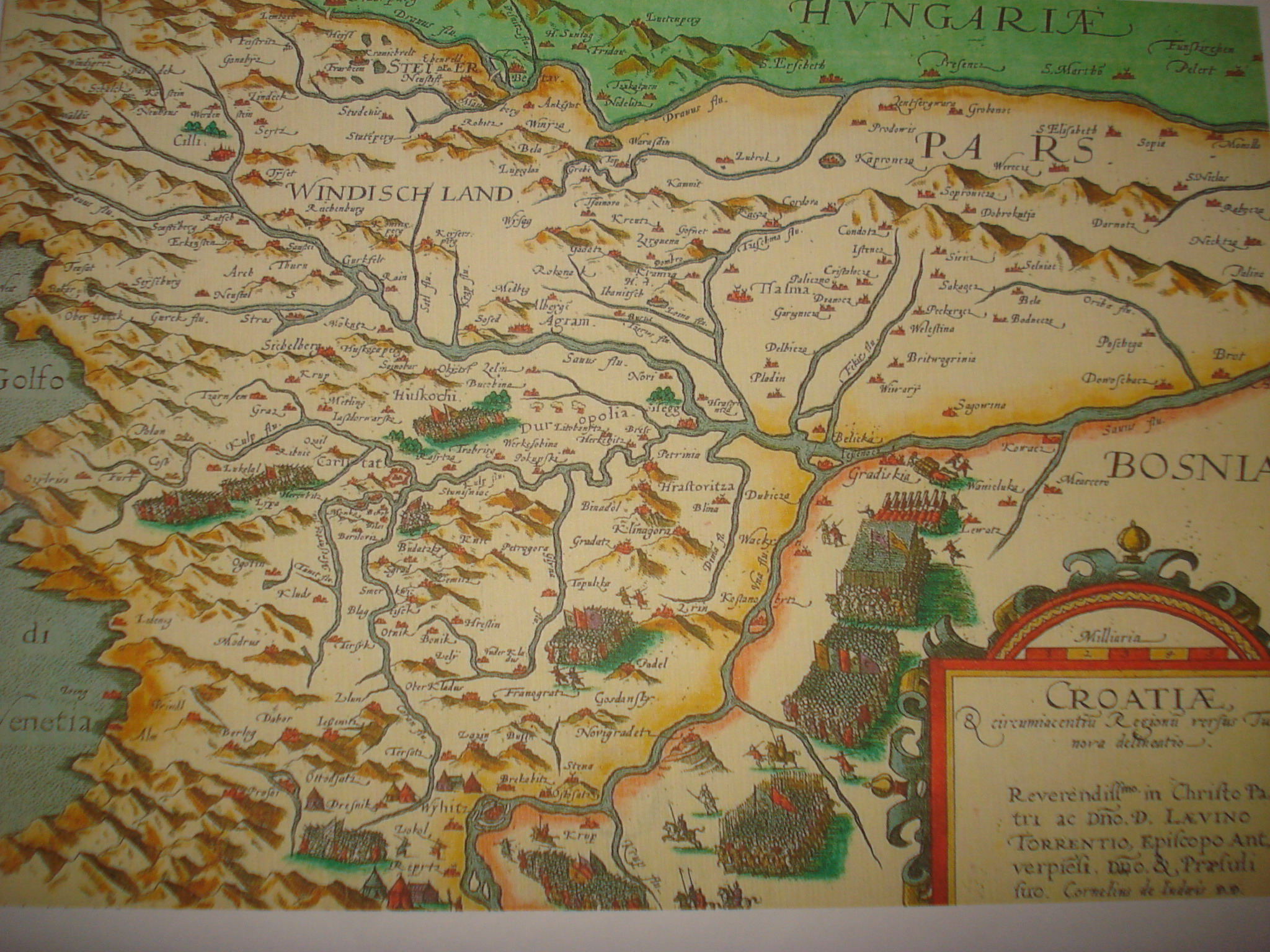
An old map of Croatia from the end of the 16th century (1593)

Flag of Croatia from 1848 until it was banned in 1852. It was during that time replaced with the Red-White flag, but was allowed again in 1860.

By orders of the king in 1553 and 1578, large areas of Croatia and Slavonia adjacent to the Ottoman Empire were carved out into the Military Frontier (Vojna krajina or Vojna granica) and ruled directly from Vienna's military headquarters. Due to the dangerous proximity to the Ottoman armies, the area became rather deserted, so Austria encouraged the settlement of Serbs, Germans, Hungarians, Czechs, Slovaks and Rusyns/Ukrainians and other Slavs in the Military Frontier, creating an ethnic patchwork. The negative effects of feudalism escalated in 1573 when the peasants in northern Croatia and Slovenia rebelled against their feudal lords over various injustices such as unreasonable taxation or abuse of women in the Croatian and Slovenian peasant revolt. Matija Gubec and other leaders of the mutiny raised peasants to arms in over sixty fiefs throughout the country in January 1573, but their uprising was crushed by early February. Matija Gubec and thousands of others were publicly executed shortly thereafter, in a rather brutal manner in order to set an example for others.

After the Bihać fort finally fell to the army of the Bosnian pasha Hasan Pasha Predojević in 1592, only small parts of Croatia remained unconquered. The remaining 16,800 km^{2} (6,500 sq mi) where around 400,000 inhabitants lived were referred to as the "remnants of remnants of the once great and renowned Kingdom of Croatia" (Latin: reliquiae reliquiarum olim magni et inclyti regni Croatiae).

=== The Revived Croatia ===
By 1699, the Ottoman Empire was driven out of Ottoman Hungary and Croatia, throughout the course of Great Turkish War, and Austria brought the territory back under central control.

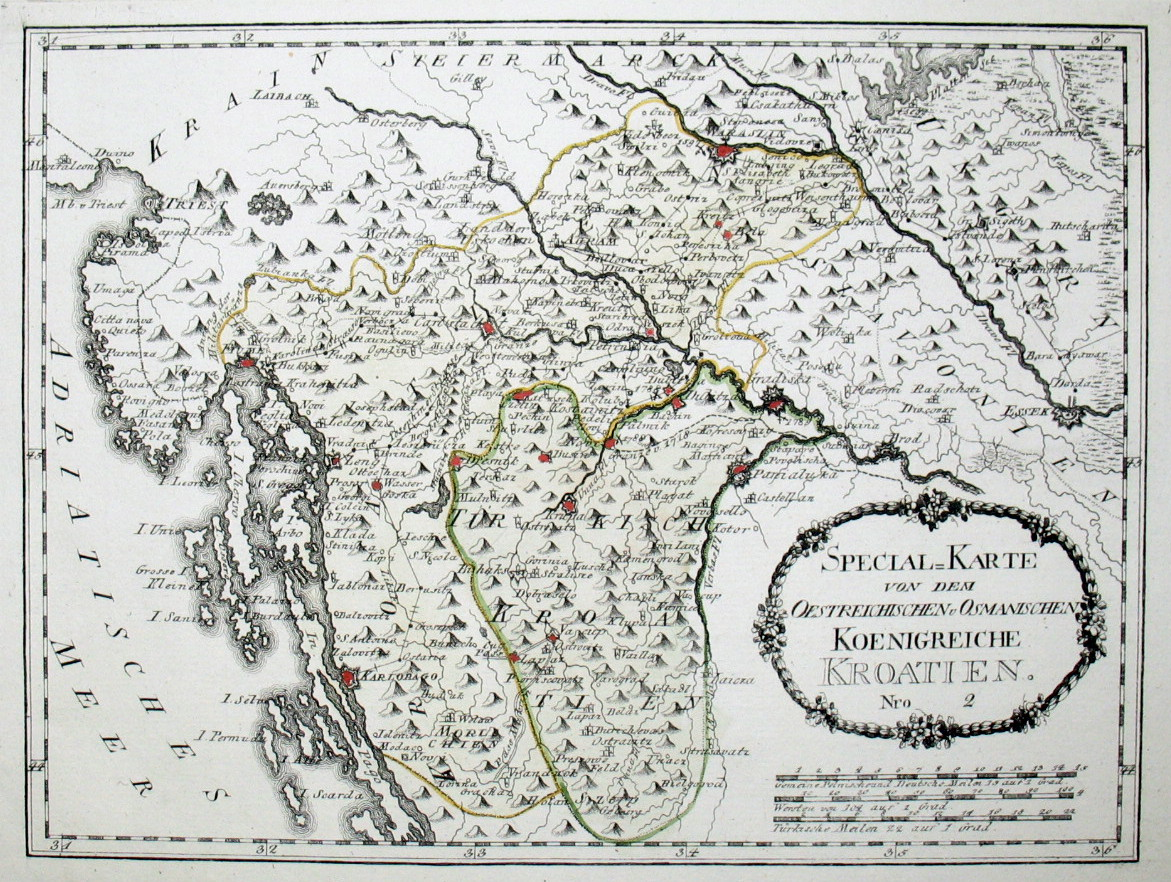
Kingdom of Croatia (including the so-called Turkish Croatia (Türkisch Kroatien), a green marked territory occupied by the Ottomans) on a 1791 map by Austrian cartographer Franz J.J. von Reilly

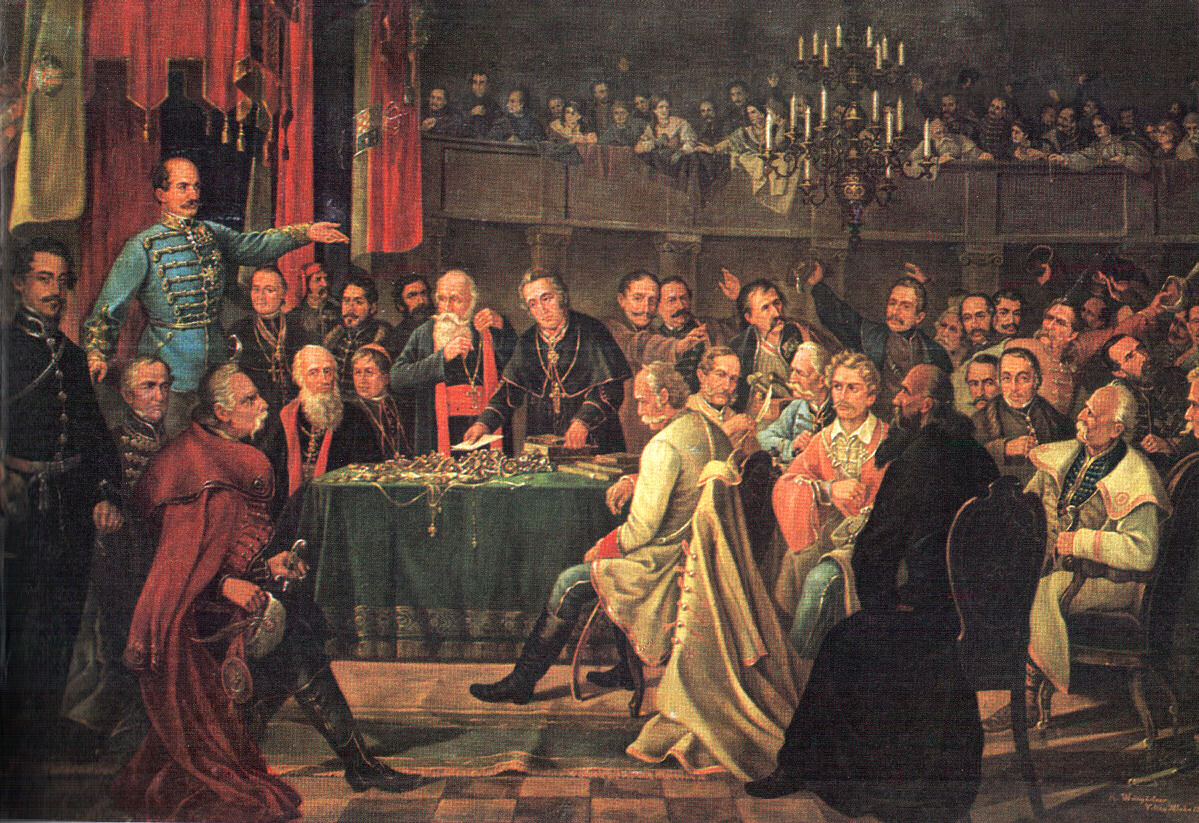
The Croatian Parliament (Sabor) in 1848. The tricolour flag can be seen in the background.

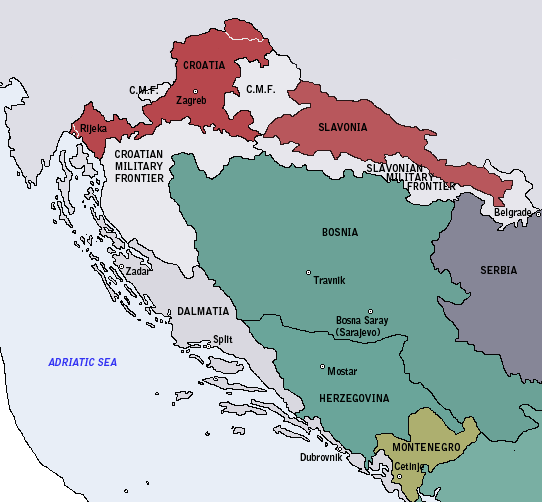
The Habsburg Kingdom of Croatia (red) at its largest territorial extent in late 1848. The Kingdom of Slavonia (light red) was at the time an autonomous Kingdom subordinate to the Kingdom of Croatia.

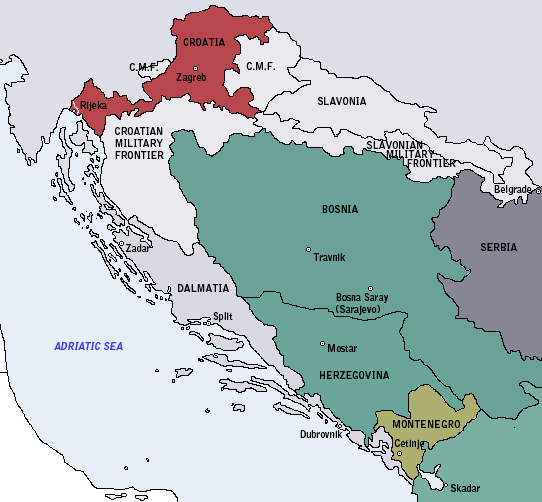
Map of the Kingdom of Croatia (red) in late 1867 and early 1868, before the Nagodba. Other lands of the Austrian Empire are in light grey.

=== The Enlightened Absolutism Period ===
Croatia was one of the crown lands that supported Emperor Charles VI's Pragmatic Sanction of 1713 and supported Empress Maria Theresa in the War of the Austrian Succession of 1741–48 and the Croatian Parliament signed their own Pragmatic Sanction of 1712. Subsequently, the empress made significant contributions to Croatian matters, by making several reforms in the administrative control of the Military Frontier, the feudal and tax system. In 1767 she founded the Croatian Royal Council (Croatian: Hrvatsko kraljevinsko vijeće) as royal government of Croatia and Slavonia, with its seat in Varaždin, later in Zagreb, presided by the ban, but it was abolished in 1779 when Croatia was relegated to just one seat in the governing council of Hungary (the Royal Hungarian Council of Lieutenancy, also known as the Hungarian Vice-regency Council, headed by the palatine), held by the ban of Croatia. The empress also gave the independent port of Rijeka to Croatia in 1776. However, she also ignored the Croatian Parliament.

==== Napoleonic Wars ====
With the fall of the Venetian Republic in 1797, its possessions in the eastern Adriatic mostly came under the authority of France which passed its rights to Austria the same year. Eight years later they were restored to France as the Illyrian Provinces, but won back to the Austrian crown by 1815.

=== 19th century ===
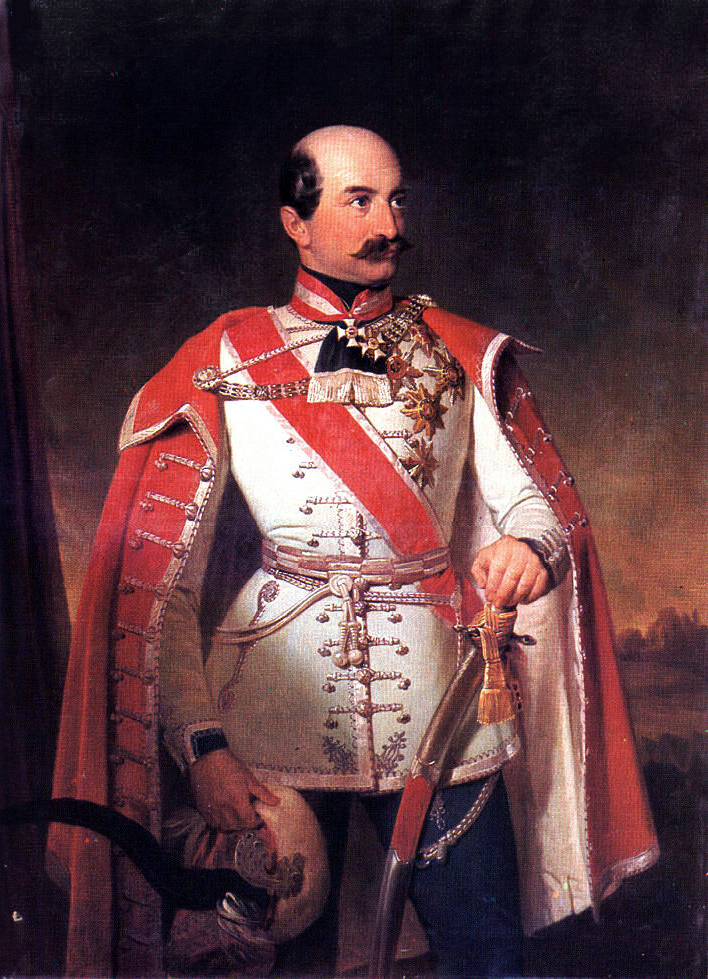
Field Marshal count Josip Jelačić, Ban of the Kingdom of Croatia-Slavonia and Commander of the Croatian Military Frontier.

In the 19th century Croatian romantic nationalism emerged to counteract the non-violent but apparent Germanization and Magyarization. The Croatian national revival began in the 1830s with the Illyrian movement. The movement attracted a number of influential figures and produced some important advances in the Croatian language and culture. The champion of the Illyrian movement was Ljudevit Gaj who also reformed and standardized Croatian. The official language in Croatia was Latin until 1847 when it became Croatian.

By the 1840s, the movement had moved from cultural goals to resisting Hungarian political demands. By the royal order of January 11, 1843, originating from the chancellor Metternich, the use of the Illyrian name and insignia in public was forbidden. This deterred the movement's progress but it couldn't stop the changes in the society that had already started.

Springtime of Nations - 1848

In the revolutions of 1848 in the Austrian Empire, the Croatian Ban Josip Jelačić cooperated with the Austrians in suppressing the Hungarian Revolution of 1848 by leading a military campaign into Hungary, successful until the Battle of Pákozd. Despite this contribution, Croatia was later subject to Baron Alexander von Bach's absolutism as well as Hungarian hegemony under Ban Levin Rauch when the Austrian Empire was transformed into a dual monarchy of Austria-Hungary in 1867.

From 1848 to 1850 Croatia was governed by the Ban's Council (Croatian: Bansko vijeće) appointed by the Ban and the Parliament or the Croatian-Slavonian Diet (Croatian: Sabor; in 1848 first Diet with the elected representatives was summoned). In 1850 the Ban's Council was transformed into Ban's Government (Croatian: Banska vlada) which, after the introduction of the absolutism (31 December 1851), was under the direct control of the Austrian Imperial Government in Vienna. From 1854 to 1861 the Imperial-Royal Croatian-Slavonian Lieutenancy (presided by the ban) in Zagreb (Croatian: Carsko-kraljevsko namjesništvo za Hrvatsku i Slavoniju), under the Austrian Ministry of Interior, was the main governing body of the Croatian-Slavonian crown land (Kronland). After the fall of Bach's absolutism (the October Diploma of 1860 and the February Patent of 1861), the Royal Croatian-Slavonian Court Chancellery (Croatian: Kraljevska hrvatsko-slavonska dvorska kancelarija) in Vienna - from 1861 to 1862 "courtly (aulic) department for Croatia and Slavonia" (ministry) - and the Croatian-Slavonian-Dalmatian Royal Council of Lieutenancy (also known as the Croatian-Slavonian-Dalmatian Vice-regency Council, it was headed by the ban; Croatian: Kraljevsko namjesničko vijeće) in Zagreb were founded. These remained Croatian-Slavonian government until 1868.

Ban Jelačić had succeeded in the abolition of serfdom in Croatia, which eventually brought about massive changes in society: the power of the major landowners was reduced and arable land became increasingly subdivided, to the extent of risking famine. Many Croatians started emigrating to the New World countries in this period, a trend that would continue throughout the next hundred years and create a large Croatian diaspora.

The Illyrian movement was rather broad in scope, both nationalist and pan-Slavist. It eventually developed into two major causes:

- a Croatian national cause aimed primarily at the unification and independence of the people of Croatia, headed by people like the parliamentarian Ante Starčević, who formed the Party of Rights in 1861
- a pan-South-Slavic, Yugoslav cause also oriented towards the integration of the neighboring South Slavic nations, organized through the People's Party, and headed by people like bishop Josip Juraj Strossmayer, who founded the Yugoslav Academy of Sciences and Arts in 1867 and re-founded the University of Zagreb in 1874.

==== Dual Monarchy Period ====
The loss of Croatian domestic autonomy was rectified a year after the Austro-Hungarian Compromise of 1867, when in 1868 the Croatian–Hungarian Settlement was negotiated, which combined Croatia and Slavonia into the autonomous Kingdom of Croatia-Slavonia. With this agreement, the Kingdom of Croatia received autonomy in administrative, educational, religious and judicial affairs. However, the governor (ban) was still appointed by Hungary, 55% percent of all tax money went to Budapest, and Hungary had authority over the biggest sea port of Rijeka (something that was reportedly not part of the Settlement actually agreed upon).

== Subdivisions ==
The Kingdom of Croatia was divided into counties (Croatian: županije; German: Comitate (modern spelling Komitate) or Gespanschaften; Hungarian: vármegyék; Latin (also in other languages): comitatus).

=== Until 1848 ===
For most of the period of Habsburg rule the Kingdom of Croatia was divided into three counties:

- Zagreb County (German: Agramer Comitat, Latin: Comitatus Zagrabiensis), including Zagreb, the Turopolje, Karlovac and Sissek (c. 1842)
- Varaždin County (Warasdiner Comitat, Comitatus Varasdiniensis), including Varaždin and Toplice (c. 1842)
- Križevci County (Kreuzer Comitat, Comitatus Crisiensis), including Križevci and Koprivnica (c. 1842)

These were direct continuations of the medieval counties of Croatia. (The remainder had fallen to the Ottomans, and when conquered by the Habsburgs had become part of either the Military Frontier or the Kingdom of Slavonia.) In the late 18th century a fourth – Severin County – existed, carved out of the part of Zagreb County west of the Kupa, but it lasted for less than a decade before being reintegrated; however, the coastal area was instead attached to the Corpus separatum of Fiume (Rijeka) as the Hungarian or Croatian Littoral.

The Littoral and most of Zagreb County, although not Zagreb itself or anything north of the Sava, was annexed to the Napoleonic Illyrian Provinces in the 1809 Treaty of Schönbrunn. After the Napoleonic wars in 1815 this territory was returned to Austria but initially formed part of the Kingdom of Illyria (as the Karlstädter Kreis and part of the Fiumaner Kreis); it was returned to Zagreb County and the Littoral in 1822. As of 1842 the Littoral included (in addition to Fiume) the settlements of Bakar (Buccari), Kraljevica (Porto-Rè) and Novi Vinodolski (Novi). The counties remained more-or-less unchanged until the revolutions of 1848.

=== From 1848 ===
In the period following the revolutions of 1848 substantial changes took place in the region. The Slavonian Syrmia County de facto became part of the self-declared Serbian Vojvodina in 1848; the eastern half of Syrmia officially became part of the Voivodeship of Serbia and Banat of Temeschwar crown land in 1849. Međimurje, Fiume and the Littoral became part of Croatia. Croatia and Slavonia were formally a single crown land in 1853. The counties were restructured in 1850 and again in 1854. In 1850 the counties were formally referred to in German as Gespanschaften and were divided into political districts akin to those of modern Austria, much like most of the rest of the Empire. In 1854 they were referred to as Comitate and a different system of Bezirke subordinate to the counties was introduced, which mirrored the structure introduced to the re-established Kreise in other crown lands. The city of Zagreb/Agram was also made directly subordinate to the kingdom and several other cities were directly subordinate to their counties (rather than a Bezirk).

In 1850 the Slavonian Virovitica County became Osijek (Essek) County and it absorbed the rump of Syrmia. In 1854 the western exclave of Požega County (Kutina) went to Zagreb (Agram) and western parts of Osijek County (the area around Virovitica) went to Požega County.

In 1850 Varaždin (Varasdin) County absorbed Međimurje (die Murinsel), except for the area around Legrad, which went to Križevci (Kreutz) County. Fiume (Rijeka), the Hungarian/Croatian Littoral and western parts of Zagreb (the Processus Montanus) became the new Rijeka (Fiume) County. Križevci County was dissolved in 1854 and partitioned between Zagreb and Varaždin counties.

Croatian and Slavonian counties 1850–54:

- Zagreb County (Agramer Gespanschaft), comprising the districts (Bezirke):
  - Agram
  - Samobor
  - St. Ivan
  - Sissek
  - Jaska
  - Karlstadt
- Rijeka County (Fiumer Gespanschaft), comprising the districts:
  - Fiume
  - Buccari
- Varaždin County (Warasdiner Gespanschaft), comprising the districts:
  - Warasdin
  - Klanjec
  - Krapina
  - Csakaturn
- Križevci County (Kreutzer Gespanschaft), comprising the districts:
  - Kreutz
  - Kopreinitz
- Požega County (Požeganer Gespanschaft), comprising the districts:
  - Požeg [sic]
  - Pakrac
- Osijek County (Esseker Gespanschaft), comprising the districts:
  - Essek
  - Verőcze [sic]
  - Diakovar
  - Vukovar

Croatian and Slavonian counties from 1854:

- City of Agram (Zagreb)
- Zagreb County (Comitat Agram), comprising the districts (Bezirke):
  1. Bosiljevo
  2. Modrušpotok (village in Netretić)
  3. Karlstadt (Karlovac; environs)
  4. Jaska
  5. Pisarovina
  6. Sissek
  7. Moslavina
  8. Gorica velika
  9. Samobor
  10. Stubica
  11. Agram (Zagreb; environs)
  12. Dugoselo
  13. St. Ivan
  14. Vèrbovec
  - City of Karlstadt (Karlovac)
- Varaždin County (Comitat Varasdin), comprising the districts:
  1. Kreutz (environs)
  2. Kopreinitz (environs)
  3. Ludbreg
  4. Toplice
  5. Varasdin (environs)
  6. Ivanec
  7. Krapina
  8. Zlatar
  9. Pregrada
  10. Klanjec
  11. Čakathurn
  12. Prelog
  13. Štrigovo
  - City of Kreutz (Križevci)
  - City of Kopreinitz (Koprivnica)
  - City of Varasdin (Varaždin)
- Rijeka County (Comitat Fiume), comprising the districts:
  1. Fiume (environs)
  2. Buccari (environs)
  3. Cirkvenica
  4. Delnice
  5. Vèrbovsko
  6. Čubar
  - City of Fiume (Rijeka)
  - City of Buccari (Bakar)
- Požega County (Comitat Požega), comprising the districts:
  1. Verovitic
  2. Slatina
  3. Vučin
  4. Daruvar
  5. Pakrac
  6. Požega (environs)
  7. Kutjevo
  - City of Požega
- Osijek County (Comitat Essek), comprising the districts:
  1. Essek (environs)
  2. Valpo
  3. Miholjac dolnji
  4. Našice
  5. Djakovar
  6. Vukovar
  - City of Essek (Osijek)

The Zagreb, Varaždin and Rijeka counties constituted Croatia, while Požega and Osijek counties constituted Slavonia.

=== After 1860 ===
In 1860 the pre-1848 status quo was largely restored and the counties reverted to their pre-1848 state. However, Rijeka County was retained until the restructuring of the counties of Croatia-Slavonia in 1886, despite the restoration of the city itself to Hungary.

== Demographics ==
According to the 1802 data, the population of the Kingdom of Croatia included 400,000 (98.8%) Roman Catholics, 4,800 (1.2%) Eastern Orthodox Christians and 40 Protestants.

In 1840, a Hungarian statistician Fenyes Elek analyzed the ethnicity in the countries belonging to the Hungarian Crown. According to the data he collected and processed, 526,550 people lived in the Kingdom of Croatia, out of which 519,426 (98.64%) were Croats, 3,000 (0.56%) Germans, 2,900 (0.55%) Serbs and 1,037 (0.19%) Jews. Population data by counties:

Primorje County

- 40,390 Croats
- 2,000 Germans
- 200 Hungarians
- 105 Jews
- 67 Greeks

Varaždin County

- 130,678 Croats
- 153 Serbs
- 474 Jews

Zagreb County

- 279,991 Croats
- 1,000 Germans
- 978 Serbs
- 313 Jews

Križevci County

- 68,367 Croats
- 1,769 Serbs
- 145 Jews

The first modern population census was conducted in 1857 and it recorded religion of the citizens. Population by religion in the counties of Kingdom of Croatia:

- 592,702 Roman Catholics
- 6,048 Eastern Orthodox
- 2,511 Jews
- 394 Lutherans
- 24 Calvinists
- 14 Unitarians
- 4 Armenian Orthodox
- 2 Armenian Catholic Church

== Insignia ==
In 1848 the Kingdom of Croatia adopted a new official flag and coat of arms. The new flag was the Croatian tricolor of red, white, and blue, and it was to remain the symbol of Croatia up to the present day. The coat of arms adopted in 1848 was an amalgam of three coats of arms, one for Croatia, another for the Kingdom of Dalmatia, and another for the Kingdom of Slavonia. The Kingdom also used the name "Triune Kingdom of Croatia, Slavonia, and Dalmatia" during certain periods (though this was not recognized by the Empire). The Kingdom still controlled the Kingdom of Slavonia, but did not control the Kingdom of Dalmatia. In 1852 the imperial Austrian government, which never recognized the tricolor as official, banned its use, along with the coat of arms. Between 1852 and 1861 the Kingdom of Croatia used the red and white flag, and its old chequy coat of arms. The tricolor was used again after 1861 (October Diploma and February Patent) and became official after 1868.

== See also ==
- Bans of Croatia
- Croatian Military Frontier
- Croatian nobility
- History of Croatia
- Hundred Years' Croatian–Ottoman War
- Kingdom of Croatia (925–1102)
- Kingdom of Croatia-Slavonia
- Kingdom of Dalmatia
- Kingdom of Slavonia
- Kings of Croatia
- List of noble families of Croatia
- Turkish Croatia
- Twelve noble tribes of Croatia
