= Nikola III Zrinski =

16th-century Croatian nobleman

Nikola III Zrinski Zrínyi III. Miklós
- Knez
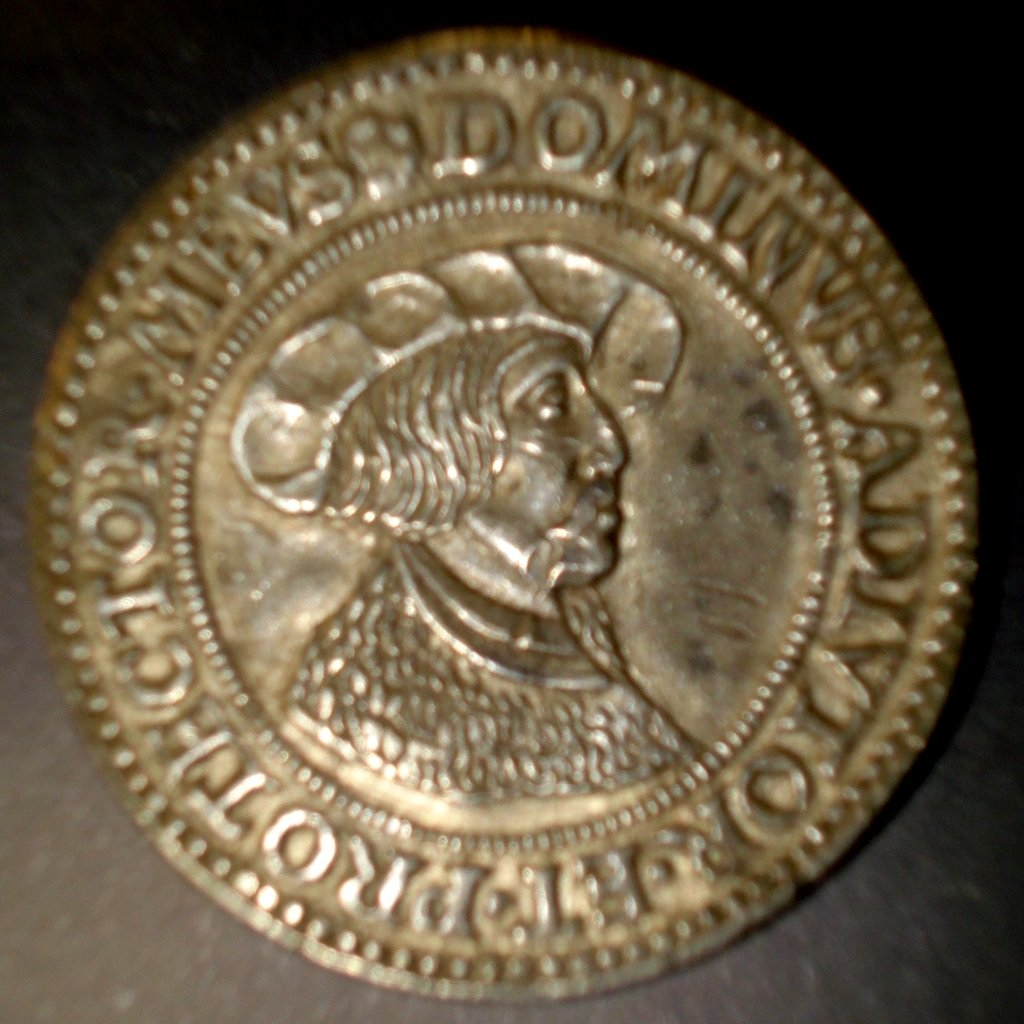
- Image of Nikola III Zrinski on a silver thaler minted in Gvozdansko
- Predecessor: Petar II Zrinski
- Successor: Nikola IV Zrinski
- Born: 1488 or 1489
- Died: 1534; Zrin, Kingdom of Croatia
- Buried: Franciscan church of St. Margaret
- Noble family: House of Zrinski
- Spouses: Jelena née Karlović, sister of Ivan Karlović
- Issue: Jelena (m. Ferenc Tahy); Margareta; Ivan I; Juraj III; Nikola IV; Petar III
- Father: Petar II Zrinski
- Mother: Jelena Babonić

Nikola III Zrinski (1488 or 1489? – 1534) was a Croatian nobleman, a member of the Zrinski noble family, influential in the Kingdom of Croatia.

== Life ==
Nikola was born as the son of Petar II Zrinski (1435–1493) and Jelena Babonić. His father had fallen in the battle of Krbava field, and as such Nikola lived on his large Zrin estate in central Croatia. He was married to Jelena Karlović, the princess of Krbava, a sister of Ivan Karlović, future Ban (Viceroy) of Croatia. They had six children, among them Nikola IV Zrinski, one of the greatest military leaders in Croatian history and a national hero both in Croatia and in Hungary.

Nikola is known for his attendance of the 1527 election in Cetin when Ferdinand I, Archduke of Austria was elected the new king of Croatia. Among the seals of six Croatian noblemen on the charter confirming the election, there is also his seal. Moreover, some historians believe that Zrinski was the one who played a crucial role in Ferdinand's choice.

In his Gvozdansko Castle, not far from Zrin, he had his own silver coins minted, as his father had done before. There were silver, gold, and lead ore mines, smelteries, foundries and mints in his property.

In the time of the threatening Ottoman danger, Nikola III Zrinski died in Zrin and was buried in the neighboring Franciscan church of St. Margaret (according to some historians: church of St. Mary Magdalene). He was succeeded by his son Nikola IV, future Ban of Croatia, and hero of the Siege of Szigetvár (1566).
