= Lukavec, Zagreb County =

Coordinates: 45°42′12″N 15°59′24″E

Lukavec
- Village
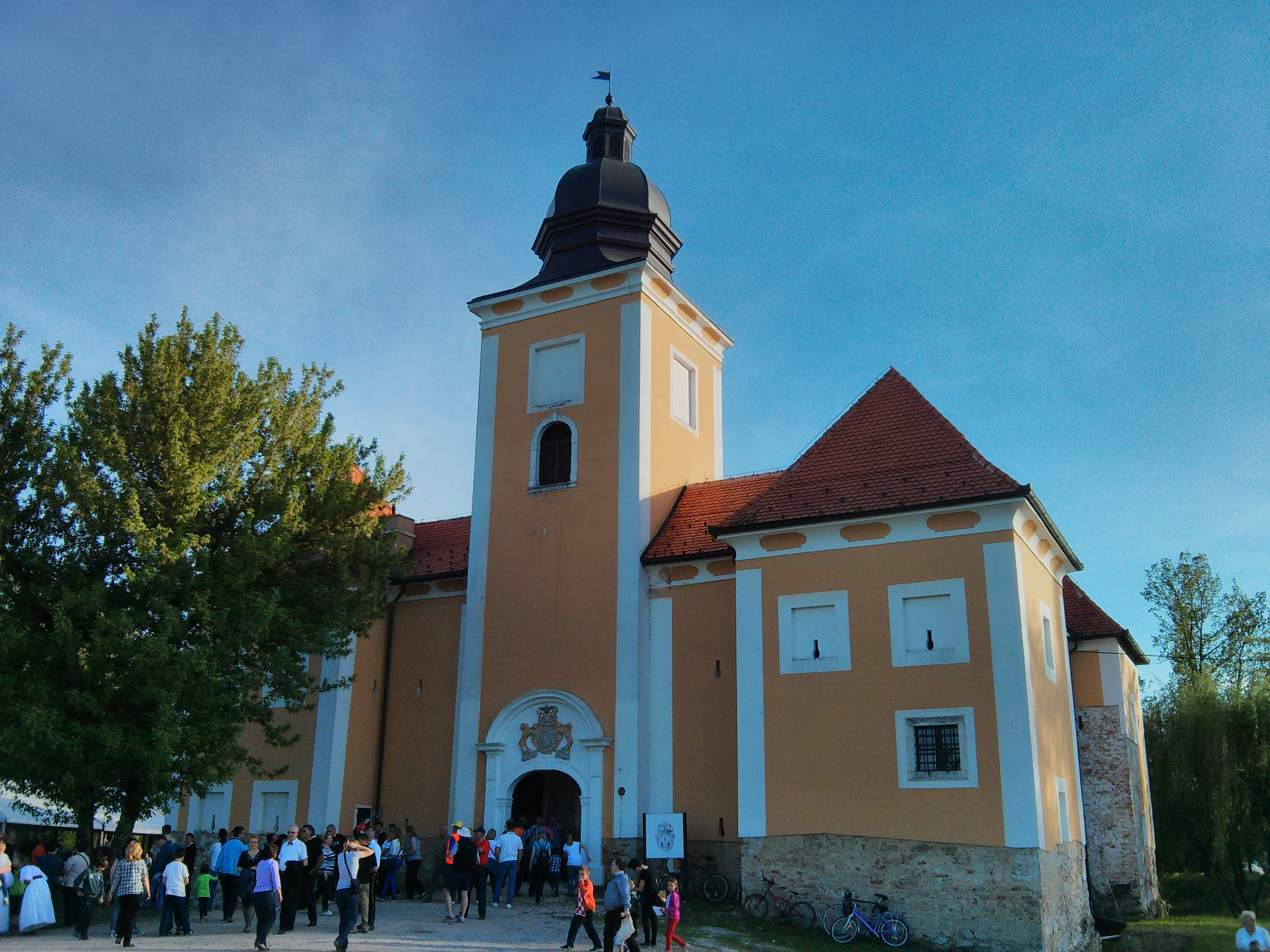
- Interactive map of Lukavec
- Country: Croatia
- Region: Central Croatia
- County: Zagreb County
- Municipality: Velika Gorica

Area
  - Total: 12.2 km^{2} (4.7 sq mi)

Population (2021)
  - Total: 1,260
  - Density: 103/km^{2} (267/sq mi)
- Time zone: UTC+1 (CET)
  - Summer (DST): UTC+2 (CEST)

Lukavec is a village in central Croatia, 20 km south of Zagreb. It is administratively part of the city of Velika Gorica, Zagreb County. The population is 1,140 (census 2011). A nearby fortification is well preserved.
