= Udbina Castle =

- Udbina, Lika-Senj County, Croatia
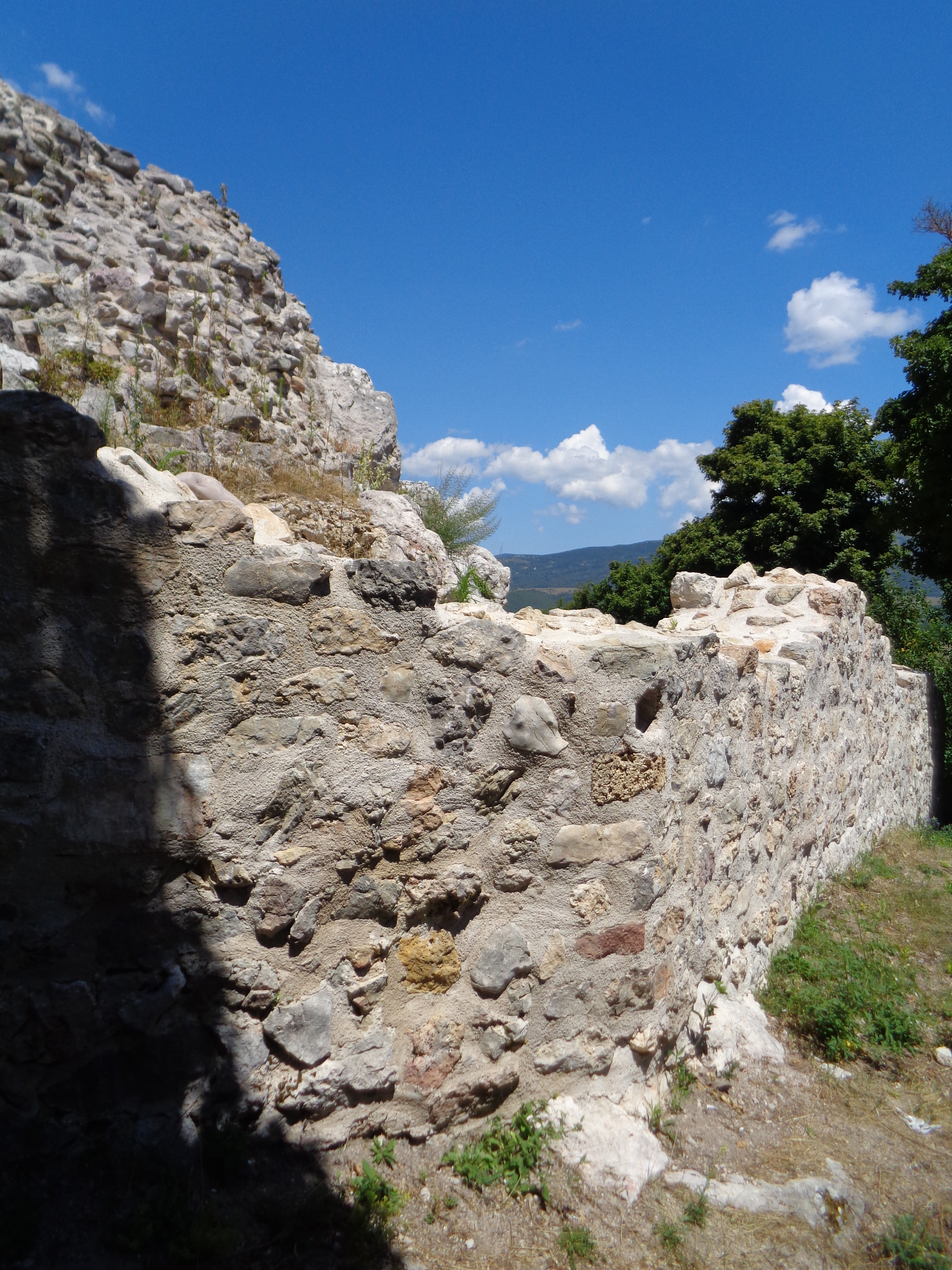
- Remains of the ruined castle

Site information
- Type: Hilltop castle
- Controlled by: Kurjaković family (until 1527), Ottoman Empire (1527-1689), Karlovac Generalate of the Croatian Military Frontier (from 1689)
- Condition: ruins

Location
- Coordinates: 44.53310°N 15.76780°E

Site history
- Built: 14th century (?)
- Built by: Kurjaković family
- Materials: rough-hewn stone

Cultural Good of Croatia
- Type: Protected cultural good
- Reference no.: Z-5938

Udbina Castle (Croatian: Utvrda Udbina) is a ruined medieval fortified structure in the town of Udbina, Lika-Senj County, Croatia. Built on the top of a hill at the northern end of the town, it overlooks a large part of the Krbava field, just above the place where the fierce and bloody Battle of Krbava between the army of the Kingdom of Croatia and the Ottoman Empire was fought in 1493. Once property of the powerful Kurjaković noble family, the castle was captured by the Ottomans in 1527. It was recaptured in 1689 by Habsburg-Croatian army, but later, by the end of the 19th century, uncared-for, the castle slowly turned into a ruin.

== History ==
=== Croatia in personal union with Hungary ===
The castle was first mentioned in 1364 in medieval documents as the name of a land district. Built from the cut stone, it was an important stronghold of Croatian troops during the Wars of Ottoman expansion in the 15th century.

At the time of the Battle of Krbava, it was owned by Croatian Kurjaković noble family, a.k.a. dukes of Krbava (Corbavia). Before the battle itself, Karlo Kurjaković, a distinguished Croatian nobleman, who possessed a large part of Lika, including Udbina, suddenly died, leaving his wife Dorotea Kurjaković née Frankopan and his little son, Ivan (* 1485; † 1531), future ban (Viceroy) of Croatia (who ruled 1521–1524 and 1527–1531) and the last male member of the Kurjaković family, in the castle. Both of them observed the course of the battle in the field below, without interfering. The castle wasn't involved in the battle at all, since the winning Ottoman akinjis left further for Bosnia, taking captives and loot along.

=== Ottoman Empire ===
Despite the Croatian defeat in 1493, it was only in 1527 that the castle fell into Ottoman hands and became their stronghold in the region. They expanded and enhanced the fortifications, making them harder to capture. However, Ottomans were routed from Udbina during the Great Turkish War in 1689, after Habsburg-Croatian army besieged the castle (following the lack of water in it, which led Turks to surrender).

=== Habsburg Monarchy ===
The Ottoman forces then withdrew back to Bosnia in 1689 and the whole area, including the Udbina Castle, became part of the Croatian Military Frontier. In the aftermath of Peace of Sistova, the castle lost its military significance as borders were moved further east. From that point on, it was used as a source of construction material for local people. During the course of 19th century it was left for a slow and continuing ruination.

== Architecture ==
Archaeological research has shown that there were several phases in the construction or reconstruction of the castle. In the middle of it there was a bergfried or donjon, a round and tall defensive tower. There is not much left of the walls of the bergfried, built of roughly carved stone. Recent excavations have shown that it was a rather spacious tower, having inner diameter close to about 7 metres, wall thickness ranging from 2–2,4 m and total diameter reaching approximately over 11 metres.

The ground plan of the castle shows that in the middle of the castle, around the tower, the three thick walls were built, which seem to correspond to the bastionic way of building to resist the fiery weapons, certainly in combination with earthen embankments. The remaining walls were thin and obviously more a fence than a serious obstacle to artillery. At the bottom, the castle was more open, which may have been due to an inaccessible slope and the impossibility of attacking from that side.

During the excavations, larger quantities of ceramics, iron and glass objects and, burnt wooden beams as well as two stone cannonballs were found. All that shows a continuity of life and the importance of Udbina, especially in the military-strategic sense, which lasted during the Ottoman rule, as well as later, during the Croatian Military Frontier period.

== Gallery ==
Illustration of Udbina castle from Matteo Pagano's map from around year 1530.	Ruins of the bergfried of the castle	Remains of outer walls	View to the Krbava field	Castle layout from year 1740

== See also ==
- List of castles in Croatia
- Timeline of Croatian history
- Military history of Croatia
- House of Kurjaković
