= Turkish Croatia =

Area of Ottoman Bosnia and Herzegovina

Turkish Croatia (German: Türkisch Croatien/Kroatien, Croatian: Turska Hrvatska) was a geopolitical term which appeared periodically during the Ottoman–Habsburg wars between the late 16th to late 18th century. Invented by Austrian military cartographers, it referred to a border area of Ottoman Bosnia and Herzegovina located across the Ottoman-Austrian border from the Croatian Military Frontier. It went out of use with the Austro-Hungarian rule in Bosnia and Herzegovina.

== Location ==
The name Turkish Croatia was used for the region of Bosanska Krajina (name in use since 1594), Krajina being a term for a frontier land. In Medieval Bosnia this territory was known as Donji Kraji (lit. 'Lower Ends') and Završje or Zapadne strane (lit. 'Westward Sides'). Donji Kraji included territories of former Croatian-Hungarian župas of Banica, Zemljanik, and Vrbanja. This territory was granted to Bosnian Ban Kulin by King Bela III for his assistance in the wars with the Byzantines. It was usually depicted as roughly comprising the land area between the river Vrbas in the east, the Sava in the northeast, the Una in the northwest, as well as Dinara mountain in the south, including the Cazinska krajina pocket in the far west. Parts of Croatian regions Lika, Banovina and northern Dalmatia were also mapped as part of "Turkish Croatia" when Ottoman borders went further west.

== History ==
The term was invented by Austrian military cartographers who worked for the Austro-Ottoman border commission set up by the peace treaties of 1699 (Treaty of Karlowitz) and 1718 (Treaty of Požarevac), which consisted of a number of Austrians and Venetians and one Croat, Pavao Ritter Vitezović. It was used more consistently immediately afterwards in maps produced for the part of the territory in present-day Bosnia and Herzegovina.

In Austrian military maps from the 16th to the 19th century, the so-called "Turkish Croatia" appeared as a borderland in the Croatian Military Frontier, whose Habsburg-controlled side, in present-day Croatia, was administered directly from Vienna. The term was similar to other borderland terms such as Morlacchia and Terrae desertae.

The term started appearing in colloquial usage among some Austrian military and political mapmakers, in correlation with Ottoman retreat and Austrian expansion, and subsequently in military and geostrategic maps. Croatian historian Mladen Ančić has referred to the term within the description of how medieval political and cultural boundaries were destroyed by the Ottoman wars and the establishment of early modern frontiers.

All these various borderland terms vanished by the end of the 18th century or by the beginning of the 19th century, with the change of the complex circumstances that had created them.

In the 19th century, following the conclusion of the Ottoman–Habsburg wars, and the transfer of power in the Bosnia Vilayet from the Ottomans to the Habsburg at the Berlin Congress of 1878, the term became redundant and disappeared from official usage completely. The entire territory of Bosnia and Herzegovina came under Austro-Hungarian rule, and in 1908 was annexed (see the Bosnian Crisis).

== Maps ==
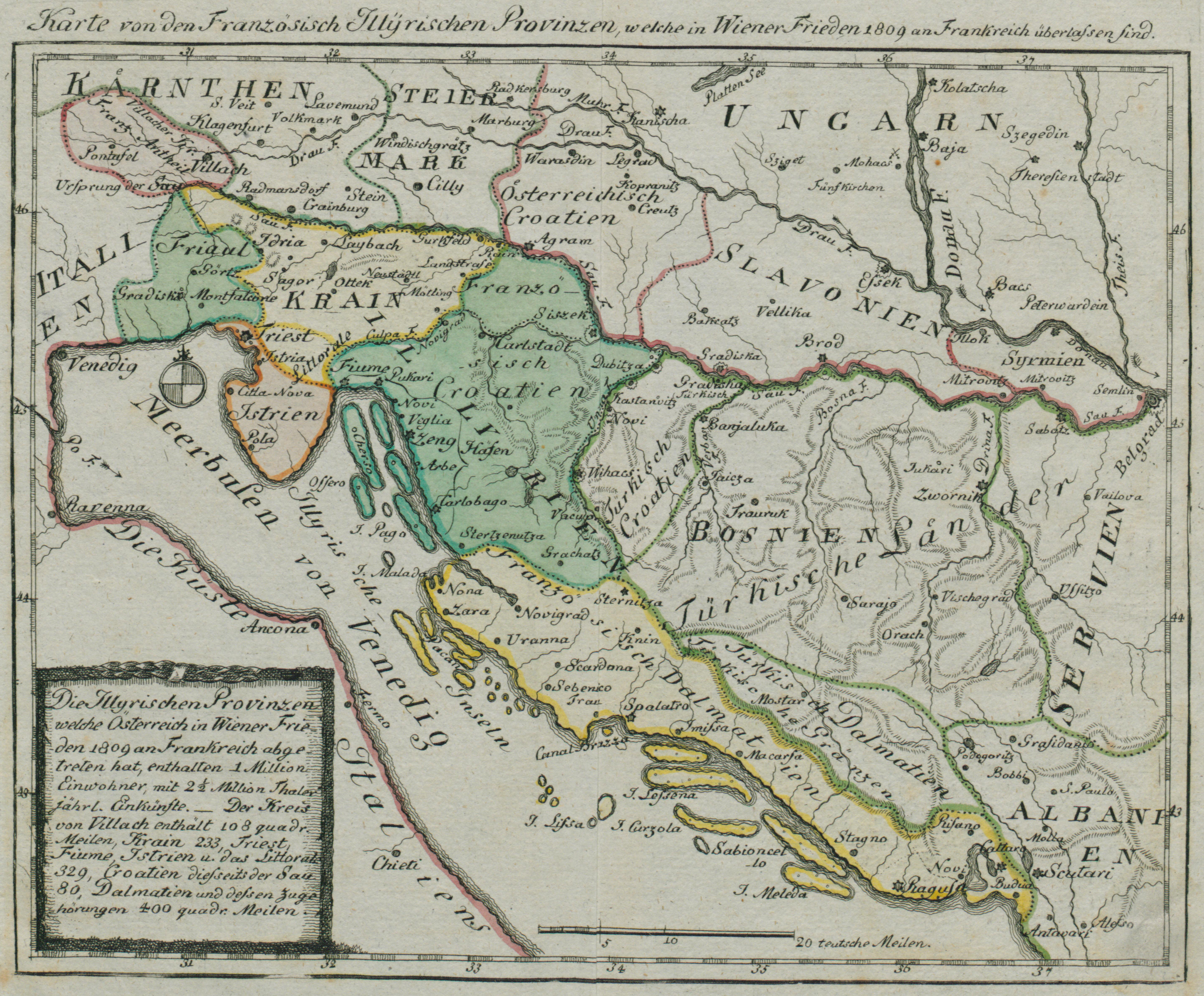
"Turkish Croatia" (Türkisch Croatien) and "Turkish Dalmatia" (Türkisch Dalmatien) on an Austro-Hungarian military map from 1813.

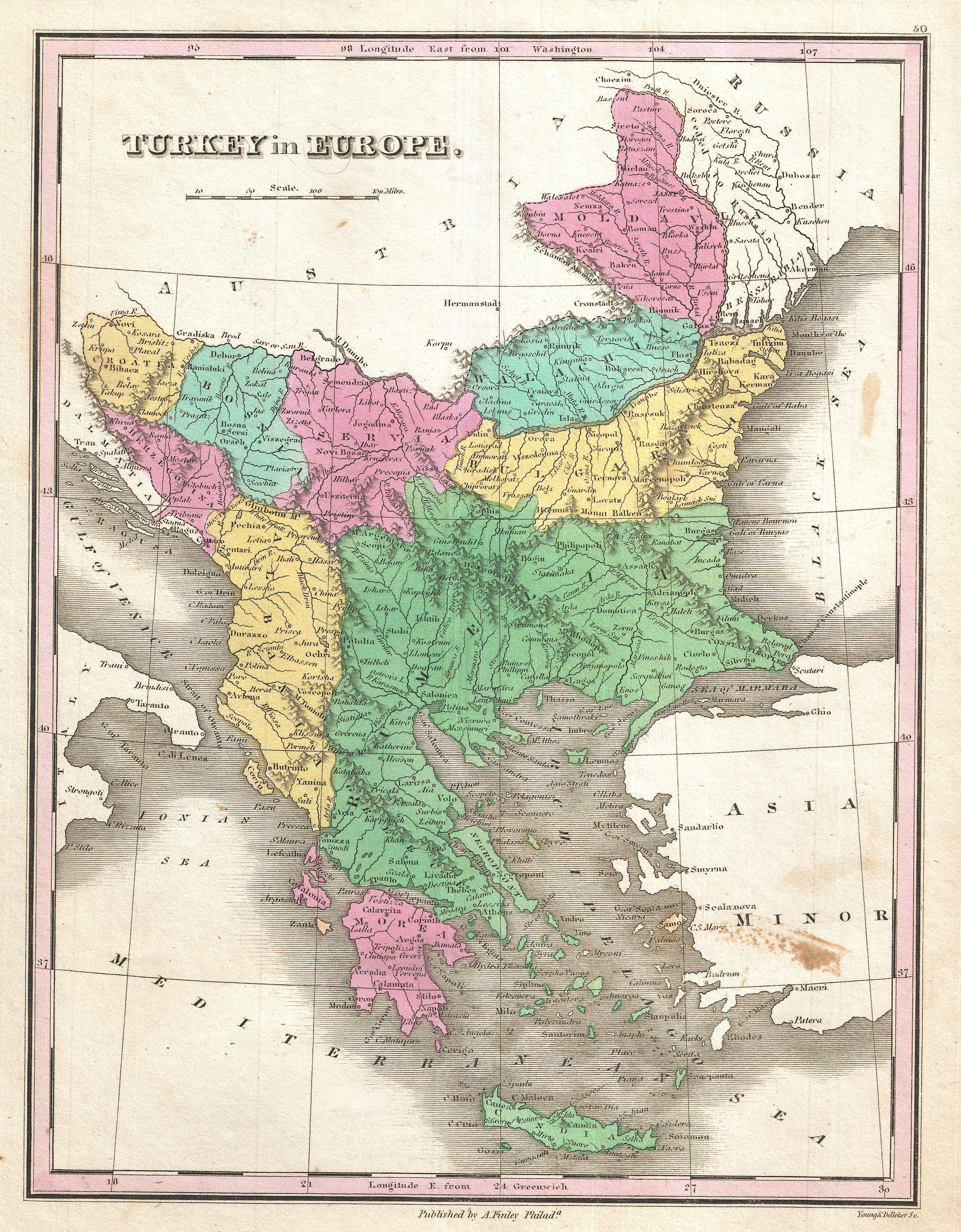
An 1827 map of the Ottoman conquest in Europe - A. Finley ("Croatia" in yellow as part of "Turkey in Europe").

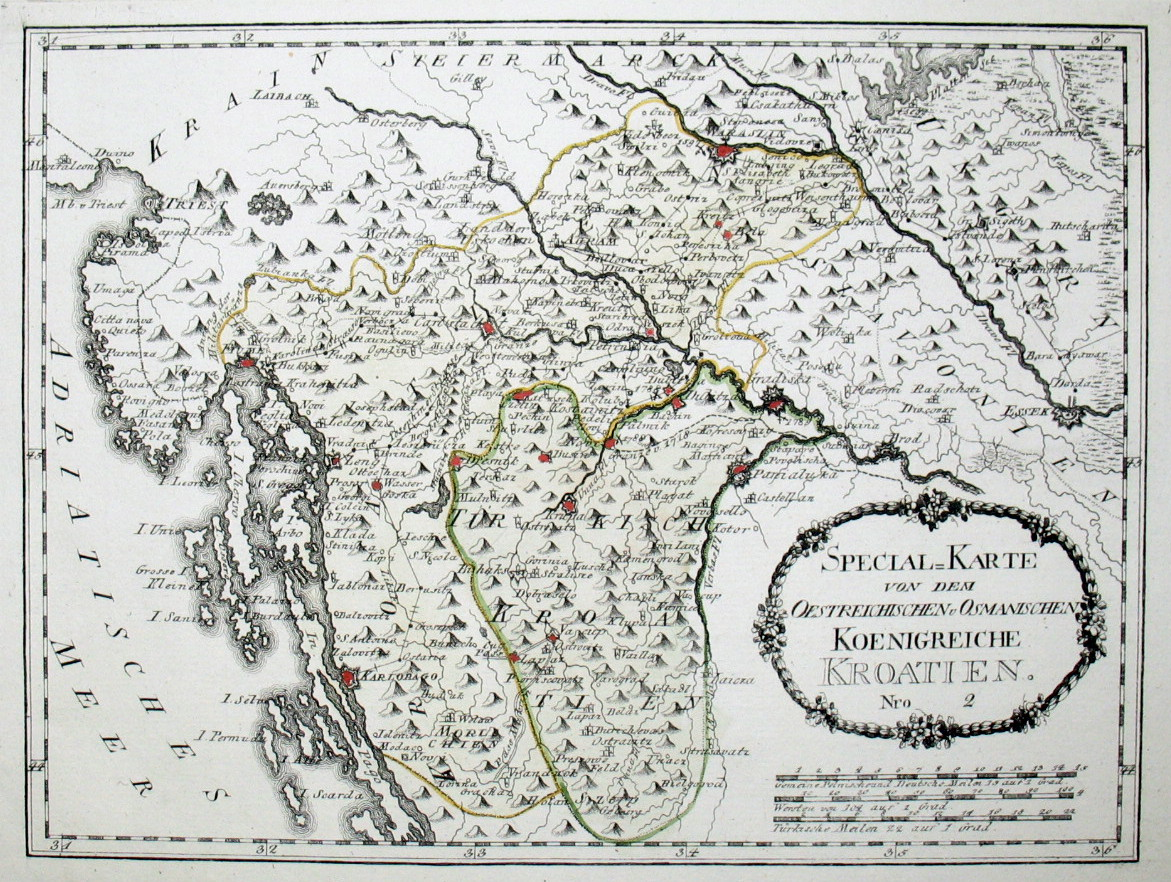
Turkish Croatia (marked by green border line and words "Türkisch Kroatien") on a military map from 1791 made by Austrian cartographer Franz J.J. von Reilly.

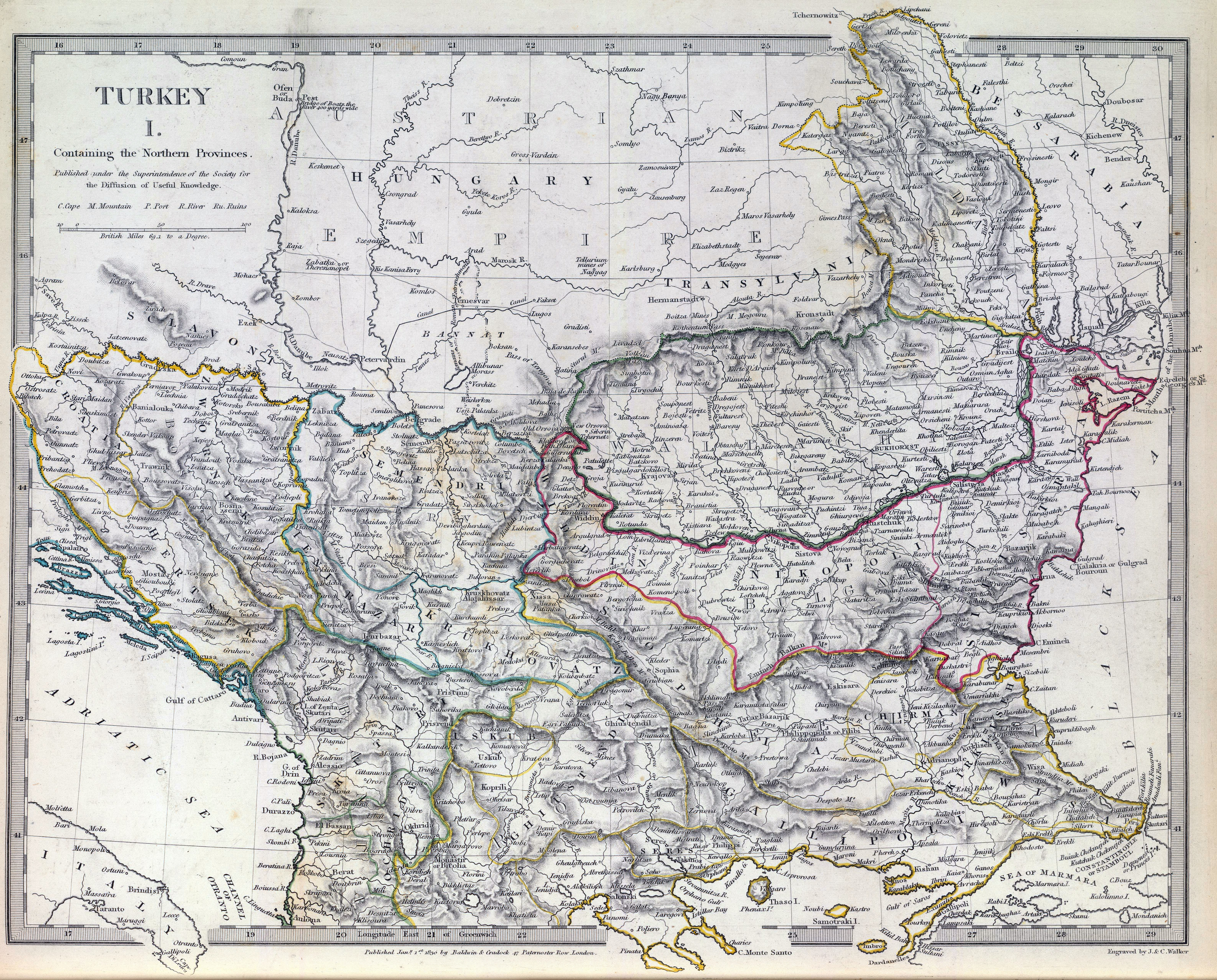
An 1829 map published under the superintendence of the Society for the Diffusion of Useful Knowledge in London marked the westernmost province of the Ottoman Empire in Europe as "Croatia"

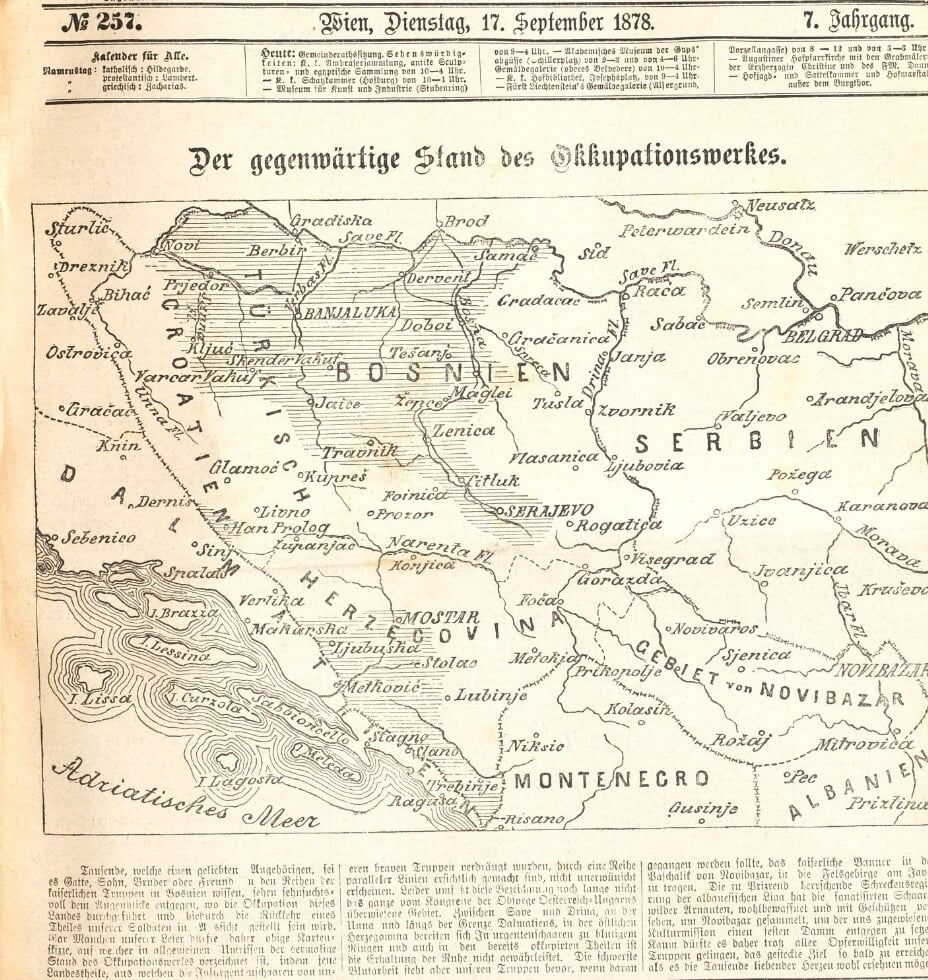
A Vienna newspaper covering the Austro-Hungarian campaign in Bosnia and Herzegovina in 1878 showed "Turkish Croatia" (Türkisch Croatien) to the west of the Vrbas river

== Legacy ==
From the maps the term found its way into narrative peculiar to Croatian national revival movement, based on a paraphrase of so-called "hrvatske matere zemlje" (lit. 'Croatian mother lands') and the "Croatian state right" (hrvatsko državno pravo), similar to the one in Serbia with an expression srpske zemlje (lit. 'Serb lands'), which is at the time propagated by the political organization called the Party of Rights. It was typically exploited for the geopolitical purpose and utterance of territorial ambitions and expansionist aspirations of both Austria-Hungary and later Croatia, via transposition of these "rights" on Bosnia and Herzegovina and its historic territory.

Although on rare occasions, the term was also used in romanticized historiography, as well as in the phantasmagoric politics of "National awakening" and "National integration and homogenization" of the Kingdom of Croatia-Slavonia of the late 19th to early 20th century. In the first half of the 20th century with a rise of nationalist fervor, up to the time and establishment of Nazi puppet-state Independent State of Croatia in the 1940s, this term appeared sporadically again, concerning the resurrection of a Croatian statehood, journalistic and political propagandistic fieldwork in regard to Bosnia and Herzegovina future by Fran Milobar and geopolitical contemplation by Ivo Pilar and Filip Lukas, eventually getting politically operationalized by Ante Starčević, and in the 1940s, implemented by Frank and Ante Pavelić via occupation and incorporation of entire Bosnia and Herzegovina into Nazi puppet-state, NDH.

In more recent times, with a rise of Franjo Tuđman and establishment of the Republic of Croatia in the 1990s, the term was revived in reference to the political and military aims that Tuđman and his close associates had in the Republic of Bosnia and Herzegovina, wanting to control both the area of former Banovina of Croatia as well as the adjacent Una-Sana regions of Bosanska Krajina. Tuđman was widely criticized, among the Bosniaks, by the Croatian intelligentsia and in the international community, for his public discussions of this matter and giving it legitimacy, and was subsequently accused of encouraging a forceful partition of Bosnia and Herzegovina. During the Bosnian War Tuđman supported the Croats and the Bosniaks, until the outbreak of the Croat–Bosniak War in 1992, a conflict based on the differences between how the Croat and Bosniak leaders thought the country of Bosnia and Herzegovina should be politically organized. The war ended in 1994 with the signing of the Washington Agreement.

Encouraged with Tuđman's usage of the term as a mean to denigrate and devalue Bosnia and Herzegovina sovereignty and statehood, the term was adopted as part of Croatian far-right nationalist narrative and, although sparsely, as part of their official political discourse, however with little if any impact on mainstream international geopolitics, political geography and historiography, or on academic research for that matter. The term never took hold outside the scope of Croatian political extremism and academic fringes.

In his 1900 work Kratka uputa u prošlost Bosne i Hercegovine, od g. 1463-1850, Safvet-beg Bašagić used the phrase Turska-Hrvatska in reference to Krajina.

References to 'Turkish Croatia' in modern-day Croatian scholarly works include discussions of a lack of an actually centrally positioned geographical space in Croatia since the 15th century.

== See also ==
- Kingdom of Croatia
- Kingdom of Bosnia
- Ottoman conquest of Bosnia and Herzegovina
- Sanjak of Bosnia
- Sanjak of Herzegovina
- Bosnia Eyalet
- Herzegovina Eyalet
- Austro-Hungarian rule in Bosnia and Herzegovina
- Banovina of Croatia
- Independent State of Croatia
- Socialist Republic of Bosnia and Herzegovina
- Bosnian War

== Sources ==
- Županc, Ivan; Fuerst-Bjeliš, Borna (1 September 2007). "Images of the Croatian Borderlands: Selected Examples of Early Modern Cartography". Hrvatski geografski glasnik. 69 (1): 5–19. doi:10.21861/HGG.2007.69.01.01. ISSN 1331-5854 – via Hrčak. "Schimek's Map of the Turkish Croatia, 1788. (Facsimile from Marković 1998). "Turkisch Croatien""
- Magaš, Branka; Žanić, Ivo (2013). "Obsession with the division of Bosnia (Footnote 11 at page 11)". The War in Croatia and Bosnia-Herzegovina 1991-1995. Routledge. p. 11. ISBN 9781136340925.
- Ančić, Mladen (2004). "Society, Ethnicity, and Politics in Bosnia-Herzegovina". Časopis za suvremenu povijest. 36 (1). Zagreb: Croatian Institute of History. ISSN 1848-9079.
- Bašagić, Safvet-beg (1900). Kratka uputa u prošlost Bosne i Hercegovine, od g. 1463–1850 [A brief lesson to the past of Bosnia and Herzegovina, from 1463–1850] (in Serbo-Croatian). Vlastita naklada. OCLC 31285183.
- Lovrenović, Dubravko (2013). "Kroatizacija bosanskog srednjovjekovlja u svjetlu interkonfesionalnosti stecaka" (pdf (full text)). Yearbook of the Centre for Balkan Investigations ANUBiH (in Serbo-Croatian) (42). Frankfurt, M.: CEEOL Sarajevo for CBI Centar za balkanološka ispitivanja/Centre for Balkan Investigations of the ANUBiH. ISSN 2232-7770. OCLC 780486455.
- Mrduljaš, Saša (2008). "Political dimension of Croat-Muslim/Bosniak relations during 1992". Društvena istraživanja: Journal for General Social Issues. 17 (4-5 (96-97)). Split: Institute of Social Sciences Ivo Pilar.
- Vukičić, Dragomir; Gošić, Nevenka (1985). "title missing". Zbornik referata i materijala V jugoslovenske onomastičke konferencije [Collection of papers and materials of the fifth Yugoslav onomastic conference] (in Serbo-Croatian). Akademija nauka i umjetnosti Bosne i Hercegovine.
