= Medvedgrad =

Medieval fortified town in Croatia

Coordinates: 45°52′11″N 15°56′28″E

- Zagreb; Croatia
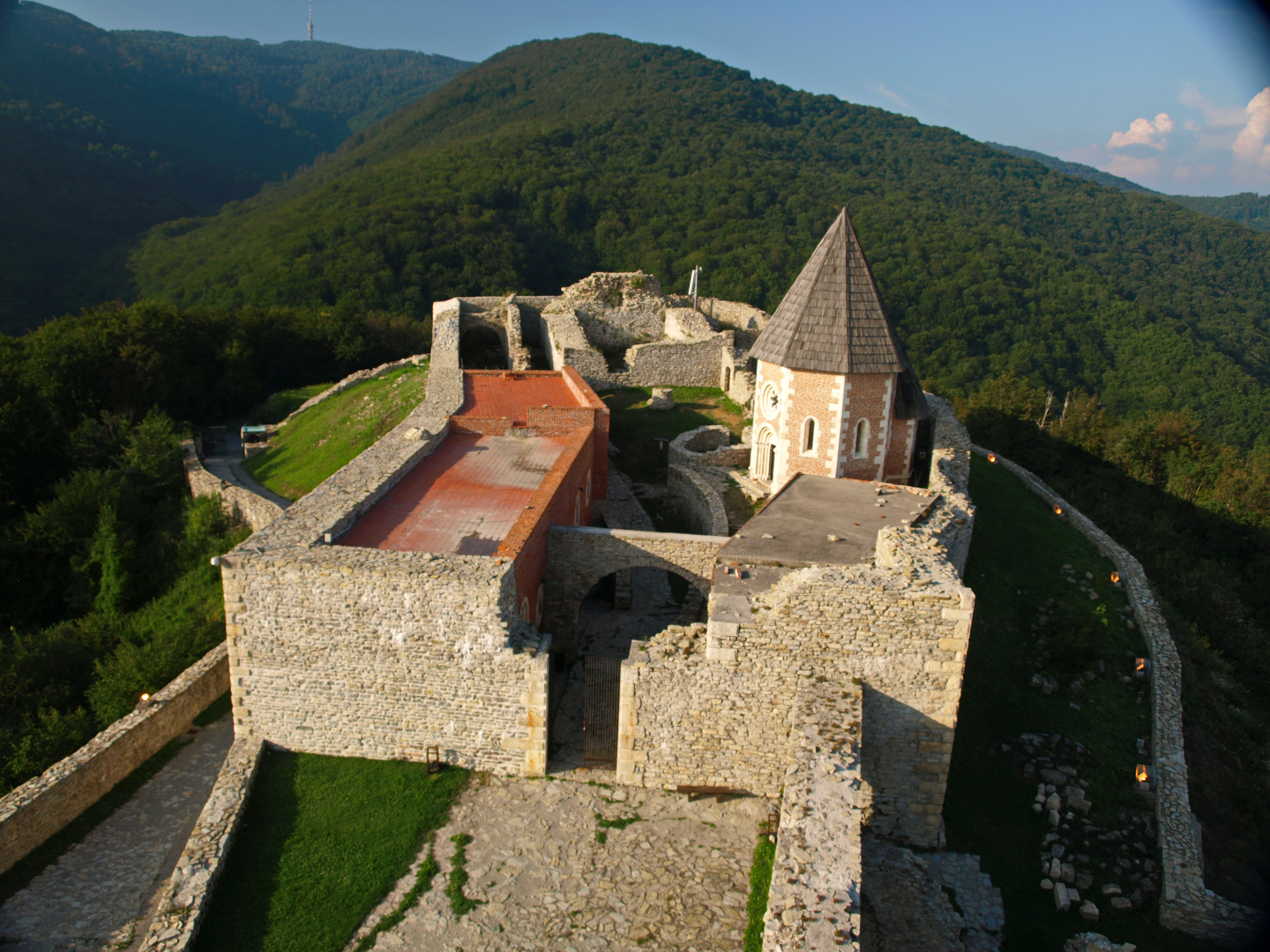
- Medvedgrad

Site information
- Type: Castle

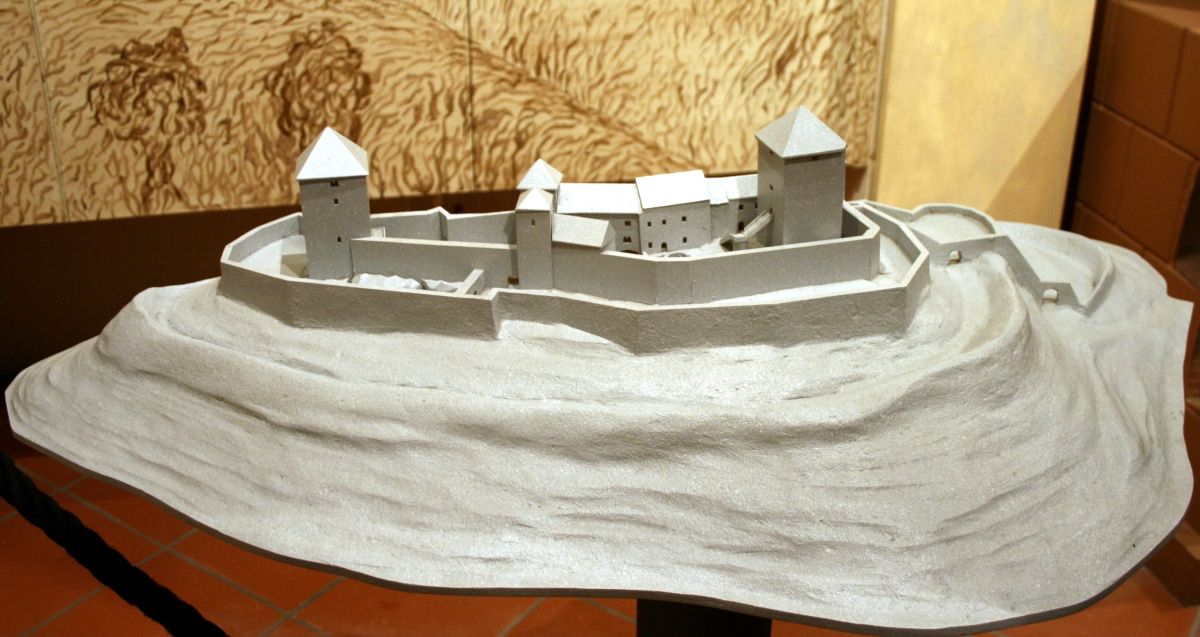
The model of Medvedgrad

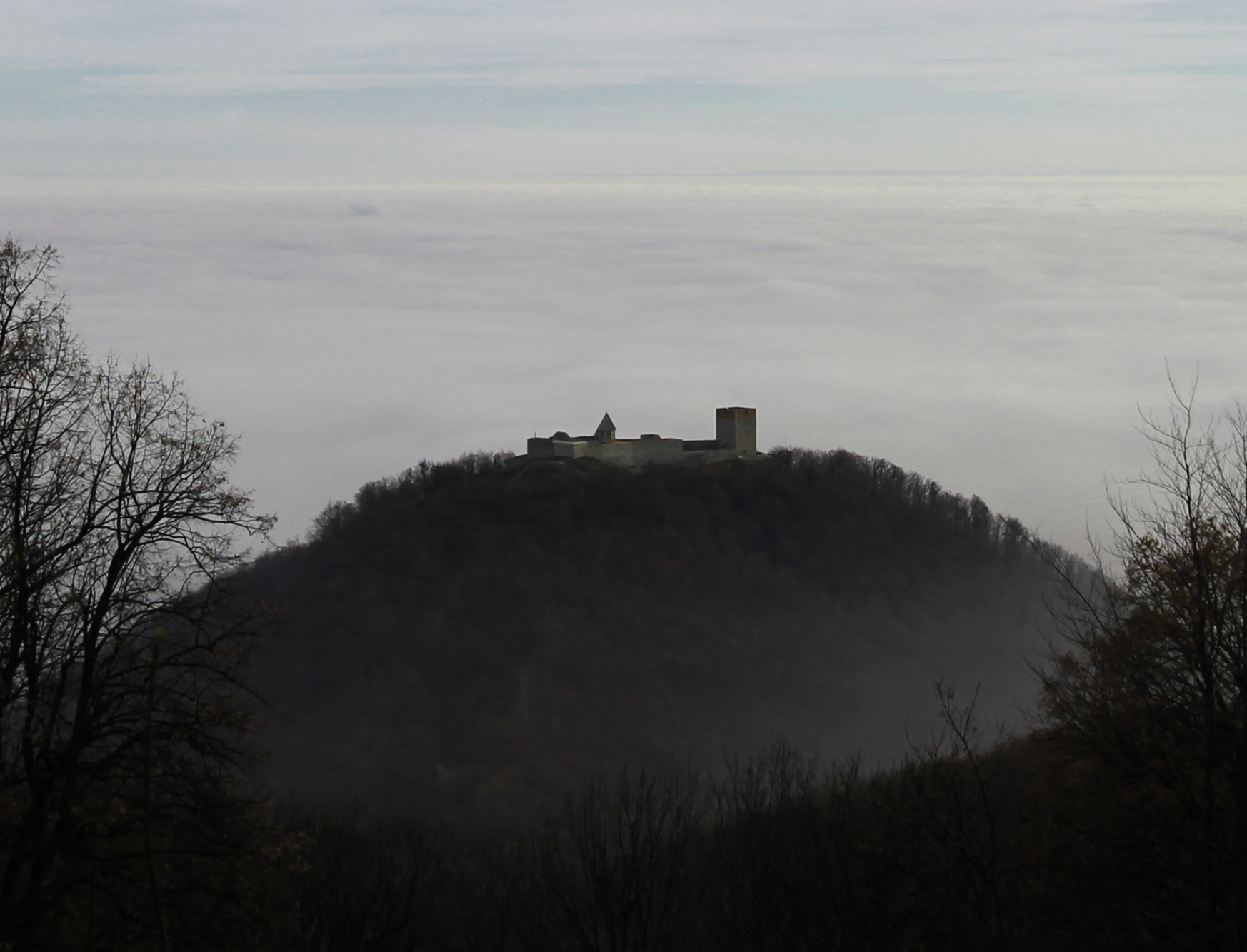
Medvedgrad from uphill

Medvedgrad (pronounced [mědʋedɡraːd]; Croatian for bear-town; Hungarian: Medvevár) is a medieval fortified town located about 10 km north of Zagreb, on the south slopes of Medvednica mountain, approximately halfway from the Croatian capital Zagreb to the mountain top Sljeme. For defensive purposes it was built on a hill, Mali Plazur, that is a spur of the main ridge of the mountain that overlooks the city. On a clear day the castle can be seen from far away, especially the high main tower. Below the main tower of the castle is Oltar Domovine (Altar of the homeland) which is dedicated to Croatian soldiers killed in the Croatian War of Independence. The altar of the homeland, made by the sculptor Kuzma Kovačić, was opened by Croatian President Dr. Franjo Tuđman, May 30, 1994.

== Etymology ==
The name Medvedgrad in Croatian is a compound word consisting of medved — the Kajkavian dialectal variant of Standard Croatian medvjed — meaning "bear" and grad, meaning "town, city" today, but it used to mean a fortified castle. It can be roughly translated as "Beartown", "Bear City", or more accurately "Bear Castle".

== History ==
In 1242, Mongols invaded Zagreb. The city was destroyed and burned to the ground. This prompted the building of Medvedgrad. Encouraged by Pope Innocent IV, Philip Türje, bishop of Zagreb, built the fortress between 1249 and 1254. Most of the works on Medvednica were completed by 1262, when it was taken over by King Bela IV. It was later owned by bans of Slavonia. Notable Hungarian poet and Ban of Slavonia Janus Pannonius (1472), and Ban of Croatia Ivan Karlović (1531), died in the Medvedgrad castle. Throughout history, Medvedgrad has changed about 150 owners, and its owners were also kings Sigismund of Luxembourg and Matthias Korvin, the Babonić, Zrinski, Erdődy families, the Celjski counts and numerous nobles and bishops.

The last Medvedgrad owners and inhabitants was the Gregorijanec family, who gained possession of Medvedgrad in 1562. In 1574, the walls of Medvedgrad were reinforced, but after the 1590 Neulengbach earthquake, the fortress was heavily damaged and the owners relocated to Šestine. It was reduced to ruins, along with the Veliki Kalnik fortress in Križevci, by the 1699 Metlika earthquake. It remained in this state until the late 20th century, when it was partly restored and now offers a panoramic view of the city from an elevation of over 500 meters (1,600 ft). The last owner of Medvedgrad was the Kulmer family. The ownership of Medvedgrad was taken away from them after the Second World War.

== The legend of Barbara Celjska ==
The most famous story from Medvedgrad is related to Barbara Celjska, the Black Queen from the fifteenth century, who was known for her cruelty and debauchery. Barbara Celjska, daughter of Count Herman II. of Celje, according to historical sources, abused the wide area around the Medvedgrad fortress - from Gradec to Samobor. Because of robberies, she was called the Black Queen. According to legends, she was always dressed in black clothes, engaged in politics, astrology and alchemy. Her pet was a black raven and true pets were numerous lovers with whom she enjoyed in Medvedgrad and in the fortress of Samobor.

According to legend, it is stated that the Black Queen sold her soul to the devil but also hid a huge treasure, which is guarded by a snake in the tunnels between Medvedgrad, Kaptol and Grič. According to another legend, the Black Queen created the Plitvice Lakes with her supernatural powers because the people asked her to because of a great drought. It is more likely that she is responsible for Kraljičin zdenac (“Queen’s Well”), a spring and a hiking junction that is also connected to Barbara Celjska.

According to the stories, Black Barbara did not end up in Medvedgrad, but was buried alive in Veliki Tabor in Hrvatski Zagorje, where legend says that her cries can still be heard.

== Bibliography ==
=== Biology ===
- Šašić, Martina; Nahirnić, Ana; Tarmann, Gerhard M. (2016-12-31). "Zygaenidae (Lepidoptera) in the Lepidoptera collections of the Croatian Natural History Museum". Natura Croatica: Periodicum Musei Historiae Naturalis Croatici. 25 (2): 233–248. doi:10.20302/NC.2016.25.19. eISSN 1848-7386.

=== History ===
- Tomičić, Antonija (2014). "Povijest medvedgradske utvrde" (PDF). Essehist (in Croatian). 6 (6): 37–47.
