= Battle of Una =

1483 battle between the Ottoman Empire and the Kingdom of Croatia; Croatian victory

- Part of the Ottoman wars in Europe; Hundred Years' Croatian–Ottoman War
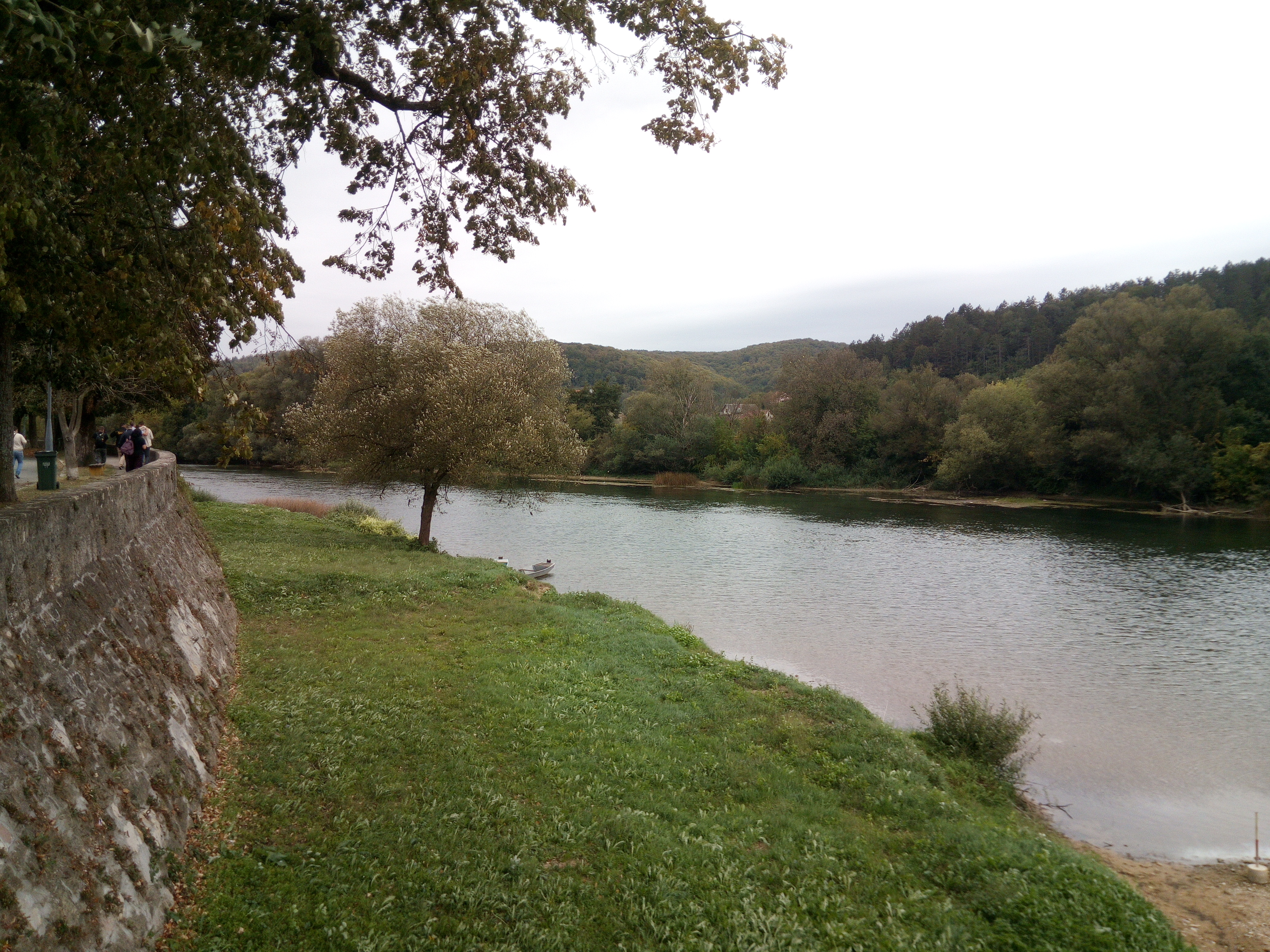
- Una river near Novi Grad
Date	29–30 October 1483
Location	Brod Zrinski (modern-day Novi Grad, Bosnia and Herzegovina) near Una River, Kingdom of Croatia 45°02′53″N 16°22′37″E
Result	Croatian victory

Belligerents
Ottoman Empire	Kingdom of Croatia

Commanders and leaders
Harsi Pasha; Sarayli Hasan	Matthias Geréb; Bernardin Frankopan; Ivan Frankopan Cetinski; Mihovil Frankopan Slunjski; Vuk Grgurević

Strength
5,500–7,000 light cavalry	Unknown

Casualties and losses
More than 1,000 killed, 2,000 imprisoned	Unknown

The Battle of Una (Croatian: Bitka na Uni) was fought on 29 and 30 October 1483 between the regional Ottoman forces, mostly from the Sanjak of Bosnia, and the Kingdom of Croatia near Brod Zrinski (modern-day Novi Grad in Bosnia and Herzegovina) at the Una River crossing and was one of the first major Croatian victories against the Ottoman Empire. The Croatian army was led by the Ban of Croatia Matthias Geréb and several members of the House of Frankopan, joined by other Croatian nobles and the Despot of Serbia, Vuk Grgurević. Their goal was to intercept the Ottomans that were moving towards the Una River. In the battle that lasted for 2 days the Ottomans were defeated and soon a 7-year truce was signed with Sultan Bayezid II.

== Background ==
Following the fall of Počitelj on the Neretva River in 1471, the whole land between Cetina and Neretva rivers except the coastline fell into Ottoman hands. To prevent further Ottoman expansion, King Matthias Corvinus named Nicholas of Ilok titular King of Bosnia. The Kingdom of Bosnia was conquered by the Ottomans in 1463 and their last king Stephen Tomašević was beheaded by Mehmed II. Soon Nicholas of Ilok was named Ban of Croatia and Slavonia, making them a single administrative unit. His task was to take the parts of Bosnia that were still held by the Ottomans, but he failed to do so. Following his death, King Matthias invaded Bosnia and reached Sarajevo, however, his success was temporary. In 1482 the Ottomans conquered all the remaining strongholds in Herzegovina. That same year Ottoman forces from the Sanjak of Bosnia led by Ajaz-beg plundered Carniola, while in 1483 they ravaged the surroundings of Ptuj in Lower Styria.

== Battle ==
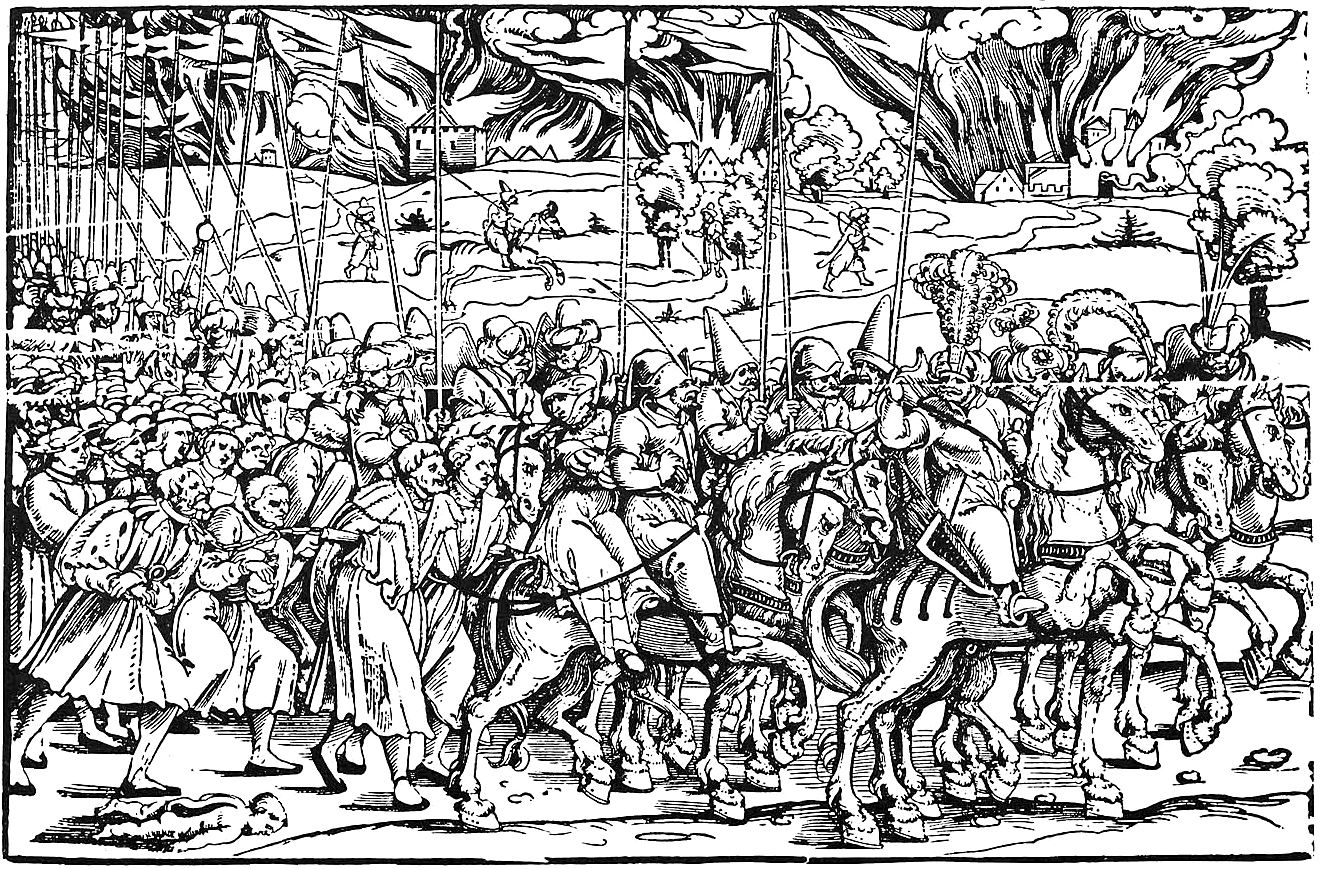
Ottoman horseman taking Christian captives.

In early October 1483 Sultan Bayazid II sent a large Ottoman force of around 7,000 Akinji, led by Harsi Pasha and Sarayli Hasan, that crossed the Una and Sava rivers and broke into Croatia. The most affected areas were the countrysides of Jastrebarsko and Petrovina. Their army was split into 3 parts, each going its own course, with one continuing towards Carniola and Carinthia on 16 October. Matthias Gereb, who became the Ban of Croatia that year, was informed about the raid, but he lacked the forces to confront the Ottomans. Therefore, he started assembling an army with the Croatian nobles; Count Bernardin Frankopan, Ivan Frankopan Cetinski, Mihovil Frankopan Slunjski, Petar Zrinski, and ban deputy Gašpar Perušić all answering the call and were later joined by Despot of Serbia Vuk Grgurević and Blaise Magyar. A part of the Croatian cavalry was sent to track the Ottomans on distance and if an opportunity comes up to intercept them.

On their way back the Ottoman armies merged into one, leading many captives which were slowing them down. Upon hearing of a large army trailing them, the Ottomans tried to evade a fight and reach the Bosnian Sanjak without confronting the enemies. As ban got bored with waiting, he marched off with his army, as he hoped to clash with the Ottomans when he encounters them. This turned out to be on the Una river crossing near Brod Zrinski (modern-day Novi Grad).

At first, the Ottomans attempted to bribe some nobleman called Vuk to let them pass, but to no avail. Then they attempted negotiations with Croatian nobles to let them back - under conditions that they release Christian captives and pay 1 Forint for each Ottoman horseman. As these negotiations were ongoing, the Croatians noticed that Ottomans started killing the captives so talks escalated into a battle.

Since there was no other crossing nearby, fighting started on dusk, 29 October. The battle was stopped by the nightfall, during which the Ottomans akinjis took position at the foot of a nearby hill. At the same time, they placed their captives on the hilltop. Fighting resumed on dawn next day and ended in a total defeat of the Ottoman army. Around 2,000 Ottomans were imprisoned, while more than 1,000 fell on the battlefield. According to a report from King Matthias Corvinus, 10,000 Christian prisoners were liberated. The King sent a special letter of gratitude to Ban Matthias Geréb and the Croatian nobles and informed Pope Sixtus IV about the victory on 6 November.

== Aftermath ==
Shortly after the battle a 7-year truce was signed with Sultan Bayezid II that lasted until the death of King Matthias Corvinus in 1490. Although during that time no major battles were fought, local border clashes continued. The Ottoman Sultan Bayazid II used this truce to strengthen his rule and prepare fresh forces for new conquests and the expansion of his Empire westward, that continued in 1490. Croatia had another victory against the Ottomans in the Battle of Vrpile in 1491, but also a huge defeat in the Battle of Krbava Field in 1493.
