= Tržan Castle in Modruš =

Tržan Castle
- Modruš, Lika region, Croatia
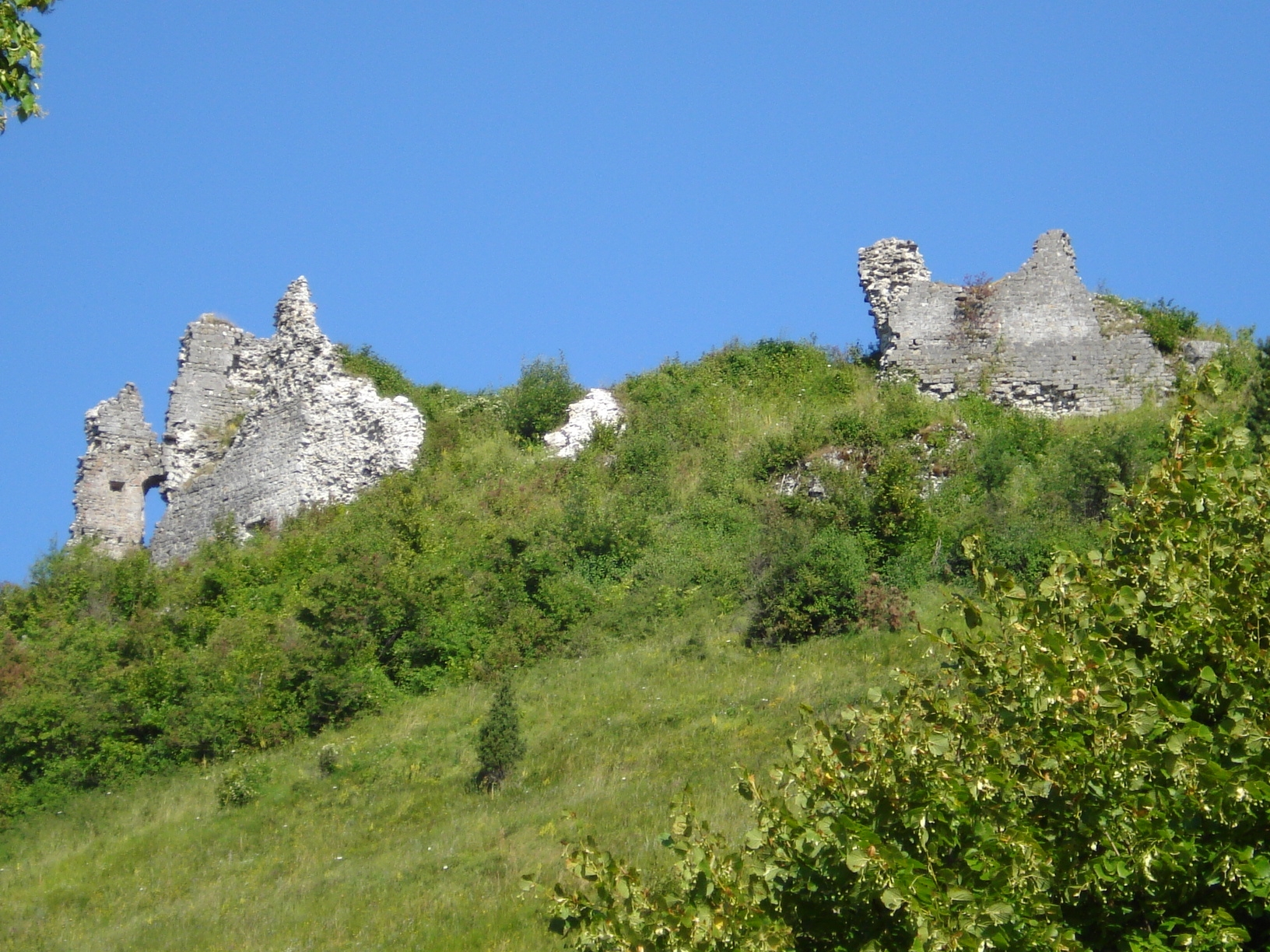
- Remains of Tržan Castle today

Site information
- Type: Ridge castle
- Controlled by: Royal patronage possession (until 1193), Frankopan noble family (1193–ca.1553), Croatian Military Frontier headquarters (ca.1553–19th century)
- Condition: ruined

Location
- Location within Croatia
- Coordinates: 45.128°N 15.241°E

Site history
- Built: 9th century
- Built by: (unknown)
- Materials: hewn stone (ashlar)

The Tržan Castle (Croatian pronunciation: [ˈtr̩̂ʒan]; Croatian: Tržan-grad or Utvrda Tržan) is a ruined medieval castle above the village of Modruš in the northern part of historical Lika region, central Croatia. Before (from the 11th century) the administrative seat of the former Modruš County (later renamed Modruš-Rijeka County), it is today a ruin in the Josipdol Municipality in the southern part of the Karlovac County.

Having been built on a ridge of a steep hill 670 metres (2,200 ft) above sea level on the eastern slopes of the Velika Kapela mountain, the castle was at a strategic place overlooking the road that connected the Adriatic Sea and the Pannonian Basin since ancient times. The road in question connected the Roman towns of Senia (present-day Senj) and Siscia (present-day Sisak). It was later, during the 18th century, reconstructed, improved and renamed as Josephina road.

== History ==
According to the famous Croatian historian Vjekoslav Klaić (1849–1928), a kind of a castle or stronghold most probably existed above Modruš already at the beginning of the 9th century, during a war between Borna, Duke of Dalmatian Croatia, and Ljudevit Posavski, Duke of Lower Pannonia.

Almost ideal position, dominating over the surrounding area, made Tržan Castle never to be conquered by anyone in its history, although the town of Modruš below the castle was plundered and burned by the Ottomans in 1493, just before the battle of Krbava Field.

From 1193 the castle was property of the Knezes (Princes) of Krk, (later, from around 1430, known as the Frankopans), a distinguished Croatian noble family. Bartol II Krčki /Bartholomew II of Krk/ was given the whole vast Modruš estate, including the castle, by the Croato-Hungarian king Bella II (III) for his merits in the wars he fought. The next more than 350 years Tržan was owned by the Frankopans, not only as one among the many castles in their property, but as the main seat and stronghold of the family in the whole continental part of Croatia. From thence ruled, among others, Ivan V Krčki /John V of Krk/ (born before 1343, died 1393) and his son Nikola IV /Nicholas IV/ (born around 1360, died 1432), the most powerful man in Croatia at the beginning of the 15th century, both Bans (Viceroys) of Croatia. They reconstructed and enlarged the old, irregular shaped castle, which was from around 1437 called Tržan or Tržan-grad, because of an increased trade that was going on there (Croatian: tržiti means to trade or to sell).

The walls, bastions and towers were built of hewn stone (ashlar) in the „fishbone“ style and represented a kind of masterpiece of the contemporary building skill. There are some signs which indicate that the foreign building masters took part in the works, most probably those from the Republic of Venice. The castle itself consisted of central part with a large guard tower and a palace as residence for members of the princely family with its supporting staff, northern part with outbuildings for economic services, various workshops, warehouses, water tanks and rectangular defending tower, and southern part containing mostly facilities for retail trade, accommodation for traders and travellers etc. Following the walls and bastions of the castle, there were defensive walls, about 1,200 metres (3,900 ft) long, around the town of Modruš, descending the slope of the hill.

In 1449 a well-known partition of the huge Frankopan estates, spread throughout central and western Croatia, took place, as the eight sons of Nikola IV Frankopan agreed to split and share their father's property (legally valid) among themselves. In the course of this, the whole Modruš estate belonged to Stjepan III /Stephen III/ (born before 1416, died around 1481–84); in the sharing inheritance document it was written: „...to Stjepan belongs the market town Modruš with the Tržan Castrum“... It was a time of constant and steady rise, a „golden age“ of Modruš, that reached its peak in 1460, as the town became a seat of a bishop.

Bernardin Frankopan (1453–1529), the only son of Stjepan III, successfully managed the whole of his property further from the Tržan Castle, although there was increasing threat of the Ottoman raids from the already conquered Bosnian territory, east of Modruš County. This led to decrease of importance of Tržan by the end of the 15th century, and the population of the whole area started to move away more and more from its old places of residence to the other, safer parts of Croatia and neighbouring countries, not willing to live in endangered territory.

In the first half of the 16th century the castle was always less maintained and repaired than needed, and after 1553 came under control of the military authorities of the Croatian Military Frontier. A relatively small military deployment unit was permanently stationed there. After several unsuccessful attempts to renovate or rebuild the more and more severely damaged parts of the castle during the 17th and 18th century, the military authorities decided in 1791 to abandon it. Following the negligible Ottoman danger at that time, they presumed that it was not necessary to keep soldiers in Tržan and it was left to its own destiny, becoming a badly damaged castle ruin today.

== Image gallery ==
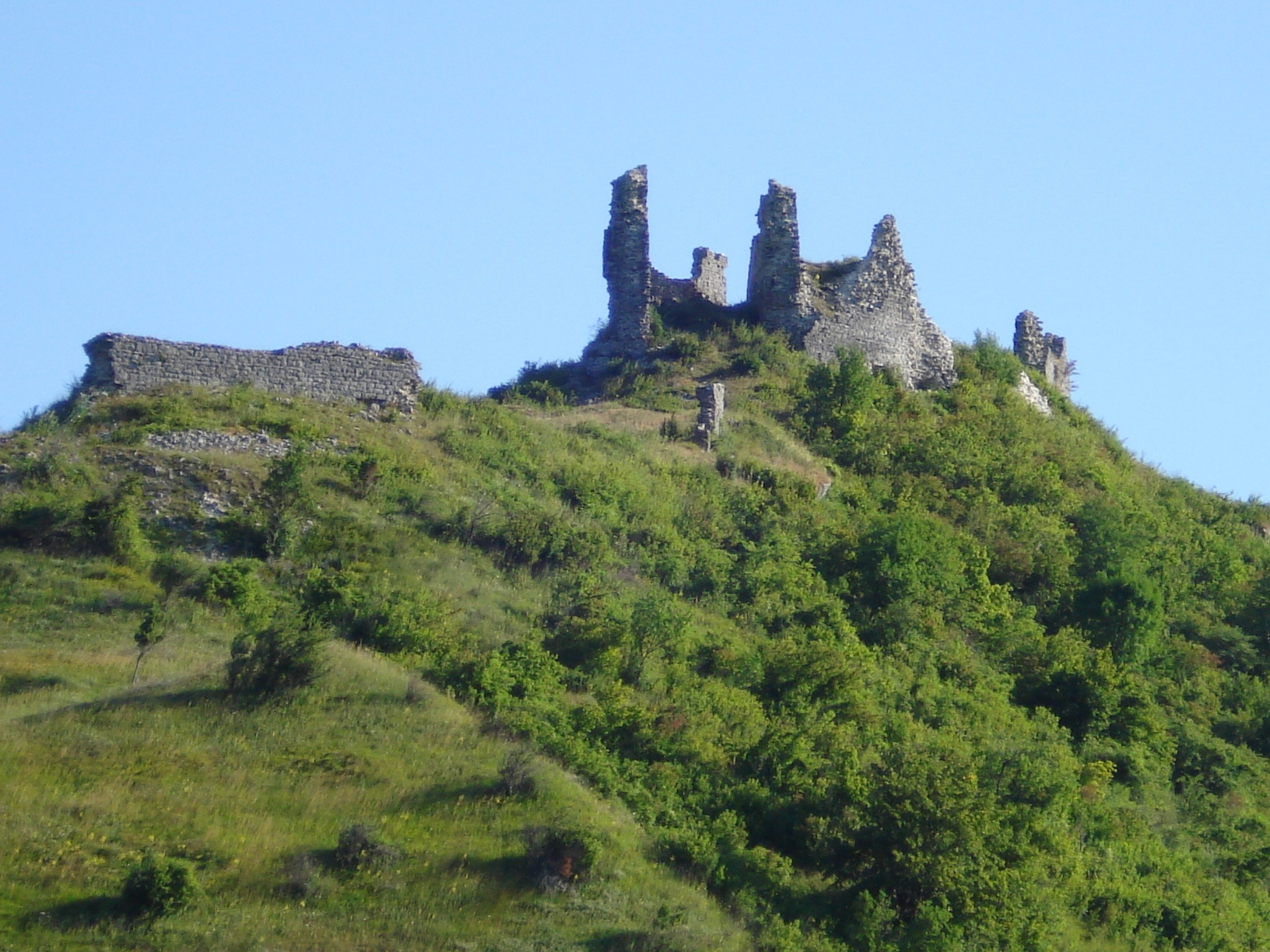
South view of the castle ruin

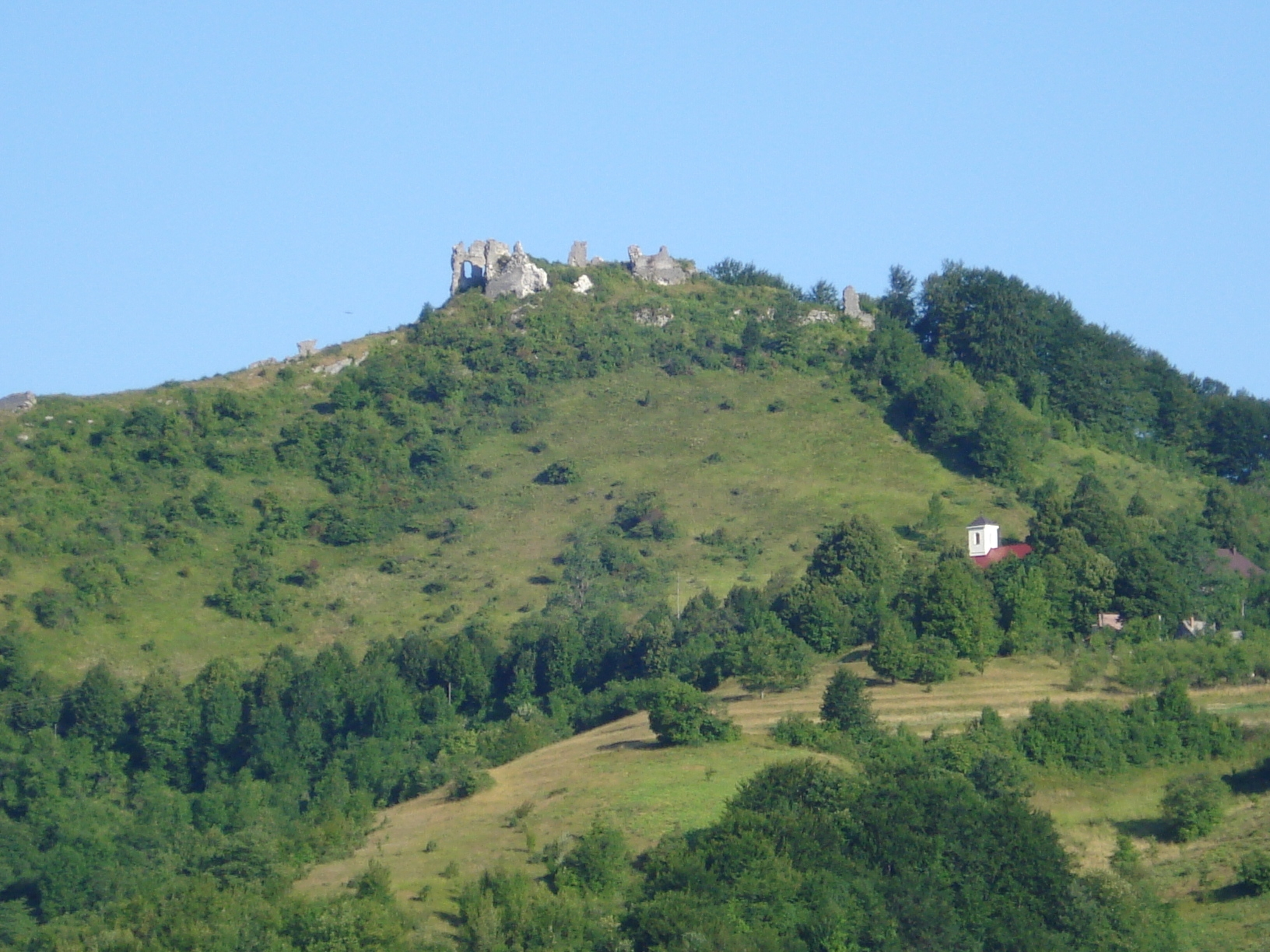
A wider view of the castle and its surroundings

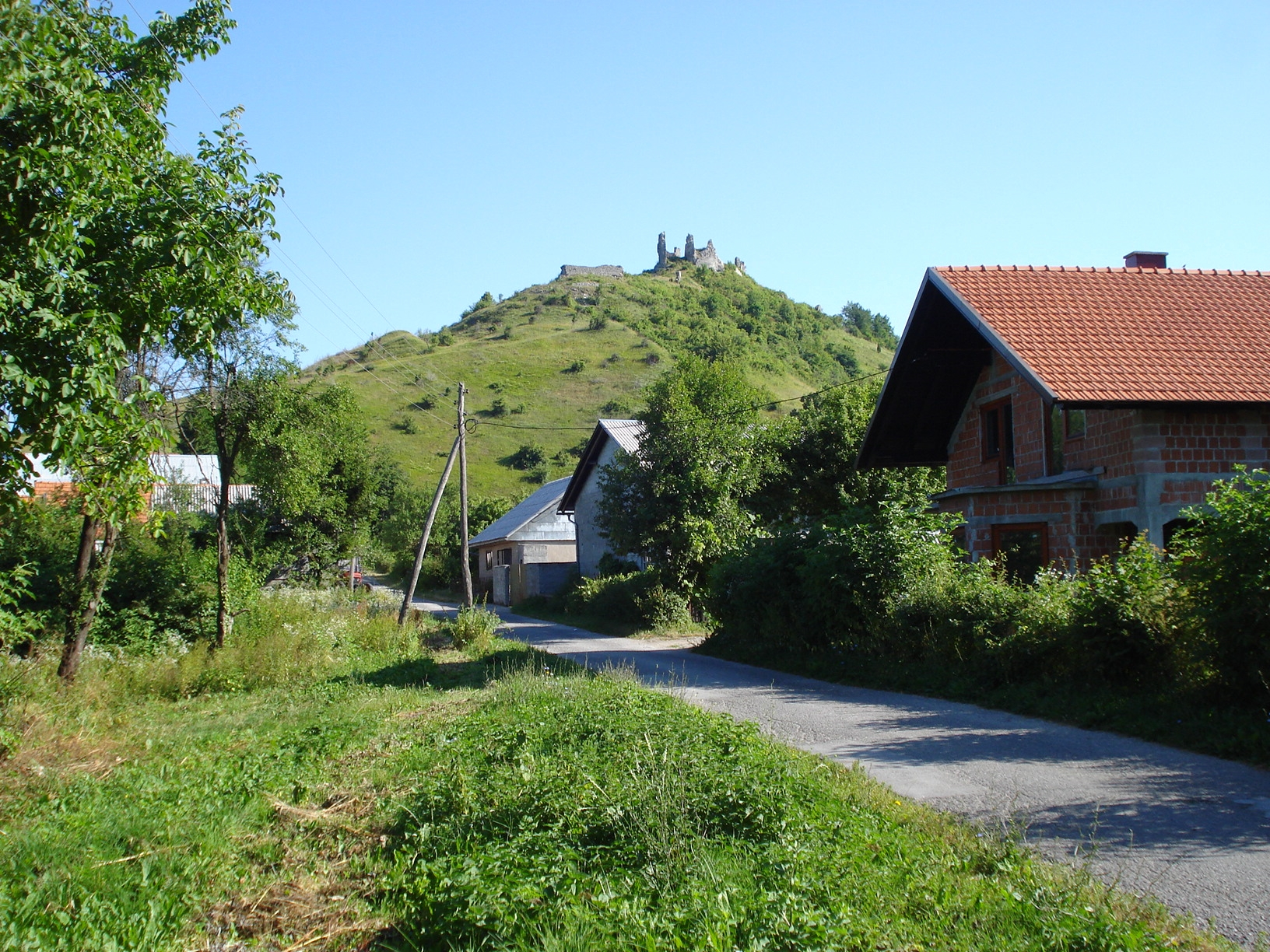
A part of the village of Modruš and the remains of the castle in the background

== See also ==
- List of castles in Croatia
- Timeline of Croatian history
- House of Frankopan
