= Bernardin Frankopan =

Croatian nobleman and diplomat (1453–1529)

- Knez (Prince)
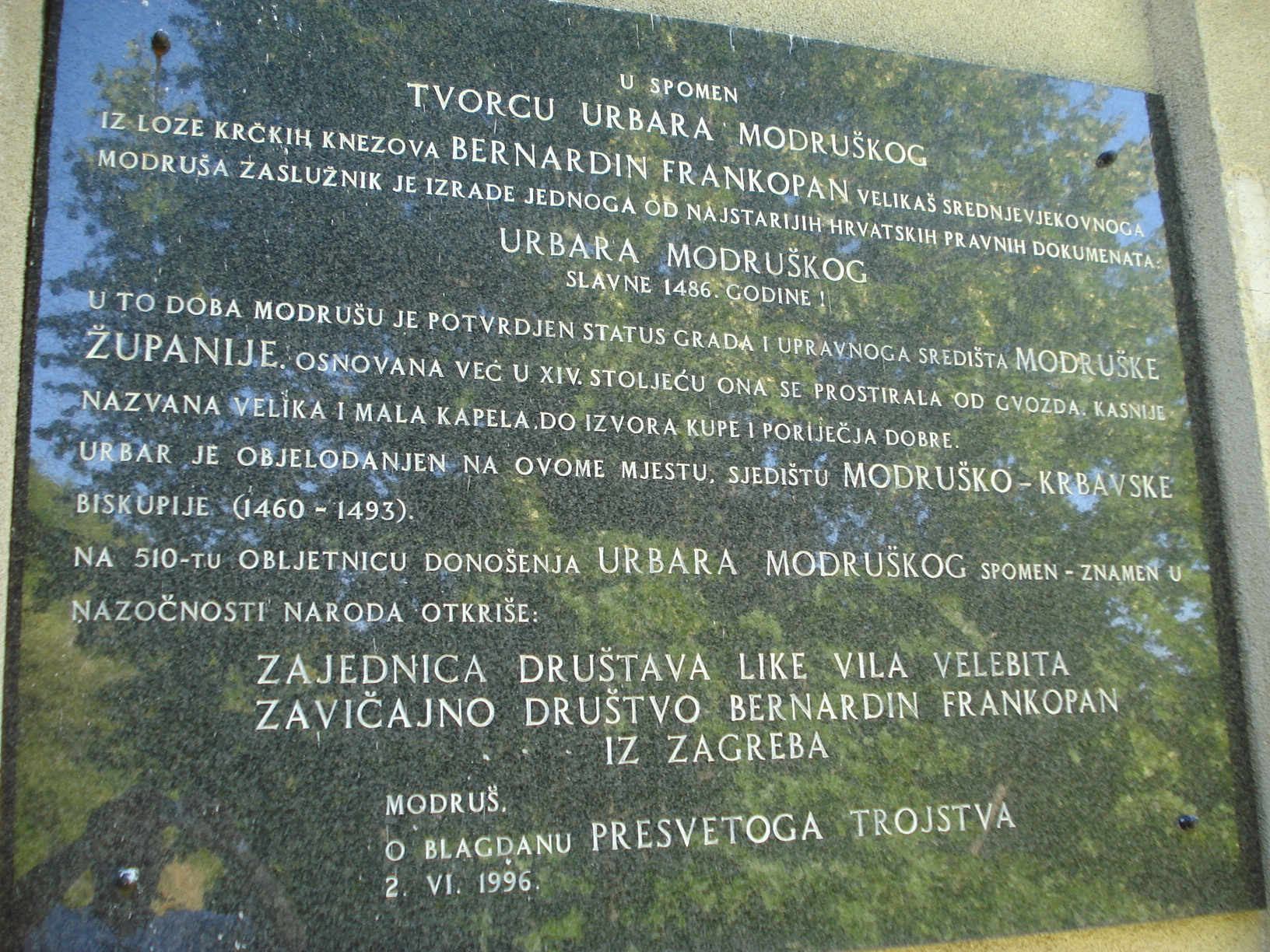
- Known for: defender of Croatia (as the "Antemurale Christianitatis" – Bulwark of Christianity) against the Ottoman invasion, rare survivor of the Battle of Krbava Field, orator, constructor, builder, founder of the town of Ogulin, publisher of the "Modruš urbar" etc.
- Born: 1 January 1453(?); Ozalj(?), Kingdom of Croatia
- Died: 1529 (aged 75–76) (?)
- Residence: Modruš, Croatia
- Wars and battles: Battle of Una (1483); Battle of Vrpile (1491); Battle of Krbava Field (1493)
- Noble family: House of Frankopan
- Spouse: Luisa Marzano of Aragon (granddaughter of King Alfonso V)
- Father: Stjepan III Frankopan of Modruš
- Mother: Ižota (Isotta) d'Este

Bernardin Frankopan (1453–1529) was a Croatian nobleman and diplomat, a member of the influential Frankopan noble family of Croatia. As one of the wealthiest and most distinguished aristocrats in the kingdom in his day, he had one of the leading roles in mounting defences of Croatian statehood against the Ottoman expansion.

== Biography ==
=== Ancestry and family ===
The only son of Stjepan (Stephen) III Frankopan of Modruš, Ban (viceroy) of Croatia, and Ižota (Isotta) Frankopan née d' Este, Princess of Ferrara (present-day Italy), Bernardin Frankopan was born in 1453, most probably in Ozalj Castle, one of the castles owned by his family. The birth date of the new-born knez (prince) has not been determined with certainty. His grandfather Nikola IV Frankopan, the sole owner of huge estates possessed by noble family known as the Princes of Krk at the beginning of the 15th century and the first person to have called himself Frankopan, was Ban (viceroy) of Croatia from 1426 until 1432.

In some sources he is referred to as Bernardin Frankopan Modruški (Bernardin Frankopan of Modruš), because at the time of division of Frankopan family property in 1449, his father inherited the large and important estate of Modruš, including Tržan Castle above the fortified town of Modruš, the seat of the whole large and branchy family. So his family branch took the title Frankopani Modruški (Frankopans of Modruš). Although exposed to Ottoman sudden raids from Bosnia in the second half of the 15th century, Modruš stayed the seat of the family branch and of young Bernardin as well.

In other sources he is referred to as Bernardin Frankopan Ozaljski (Bernardin Frankopan of Ozalj, because he, together with his father, took over the spacious Ozalj estate with dominant Ozalj Castle after the death of Bernardin's cousin Bartol X Frankopan of Ozalj on 22 February 1474. Bartol (Bartholomew) was the last descendant of his family branch, so the Bernardin's branch took the epithet Ozaljski.

On 16 September 1476 he married Lujza (Louise) Marzano d' Aragona, a daughter of prince (principe) Giovanni Francesco Marino Marzano and royal princess Leonora d' Aragona (daughter of Alfonso V of Aragon), and had nine children. Among them there were Krsto (Christopher) – the future well-known military leader, Beatrica – the wife of Ivaniš Korvin, Ban of Croatia, Ferdinand, Matija, Ivan X Franjo, Marija Magdalena, Elizabeta, Eufrozina (Fruzsina) married Dessewffy Ferenc, and Katarina.

=== Life in turbulent times ===
The life of Bernardin Frankopan was since his childhood marked by permanent tensions, conflicts and heavy battles, from which he tried to get benefit for himself, for his family and for Croatia. As a young boy he sometimes accompanied his father during diplomatic missions and journeys (appointed by the Croato-Hungarian King Matija Korvin) throughout Europe and got acquainted with many notable and important people. He spent some time in the court of the Friedrich III of Habsburg, Emperor of the Holy Roman Empire, in Graz, Austria, when he was a teenager (about 1469). As a young man he further fostered good relationships with the Emperor, but also improved ties with Matija Korvin. Nevertheless, the relation with the latter was overshadowed and harmed by the loss of the city of Senj, an old Frankopan property, in favour of the King in 1469.

An especially good relationship with Ivaniš Korvin, King Matija's illegitimate son, was confirmed by Korvin's marriage to Bernardin's daughter Beatrica in 1496. The rich father provided a dowry of two fortified towns, Bihać and Novi, to his beautiful sixteen-year-old daughter.

In 1493 he took part in the fateful Battle of Krbava Field, side by side with many distinguished Croatian noblemen. Because of bad military tactics ordered by the Croatian supreme commander Mirko (Emerik) Derenčin, Ban (viceroy) of Croatia, the aggressive Ottoman army won the battle. Many Croatian noblemen and most of the soldiers lost their lives or were imprisoned, but Bernardin was among those few who survived. Towards the end of the battle he saw that the defeat was inevitable and consequently retreated in order to save his life.

A few years later (around 1500) he had a new castle built in Ogulin, a location north from Modruš, because the life there appeared to be a little bit safer. It is not surely known whether he stayed living in Modruš for quite a while or soon moved to Ogulin to spend the rest of his life there.

Unlike his relatives from the other Frankopan branches, he did not support the members of the Habsburg family at the royal elections in 1490 and 1527, but was a supporter of their opponents. In 1490 he first backed Ivaniš Korvin against Maximilian I of Habsburg, and later accepted the newly elected king Vladislav II Jagiellon though. In 1527 election he supported Ivan Zapolja against Ferdinand I of Habsburg to be the king.

As a man of diplomatic experience, he tried to get help for Croatia from the whole of Europe, but with little success. His inspirational and passionate speeches before European rulers, dignitaries or parliament members, claiming military actions against the Ottomans, resulted almost only in the words of encouragement, but no action. Well-known are, for instance, his speeches before Antonio Grimani, the Doge of Venice, and before the German Parliament in Nuremberg on 19 November 1522 (a speech called in Latin: Oratio pro Croatia (Speech for Croatia)).

=== Death and legacy ===
In the 1520s he lost two of his sons, Ferdinand and Krsto (Christopher) (the latter falling during the siege of Varaždin castle on 27 September 1527). His daughter Beatrice died in 1510, while her three children from the marriage with John Corvinus died before her. Bernardin's sole heir remained his grandson Stjepan IV Frankopan of Ozalj, Ferdinand's son, who was still a boy when his father died. Stjepan's sister Katarina married Nikola Šubić Zrinski, future hero of Szigetvár.

Bernardin Frankopan died in 1529 (or perhaps in 1530; The exact time of death is not definitely determined) as an old man and Doyen of the Croatian nobility at that time. His descendants were later (during the 16th century) forced to leave many of their old properties (Bihać, Drežnik, Tržac, Furjan, Cetingrad, Mala Kladuša, Velika Kladuša etc.) and move to the west and north of Croatia, due to the Ottoman threat.

Besides his military and diplomatic importance, he is known for his devotion to the culture development and improvement of education, as well as for his efforts in building and construction area. He improved and took care of Croatian language and Glagolitic script, and had the Bible translated into Croatian. In 1486 he published the famous "Modruški urbar" ("Urbarium of Modruš"), a book of legal norms and register of fief ownership, written in Glagolitic script by the Modruš scribes Martin Ostriharić and Ivan Klinčić.

== Some castles of Bernardin Frankopan ==
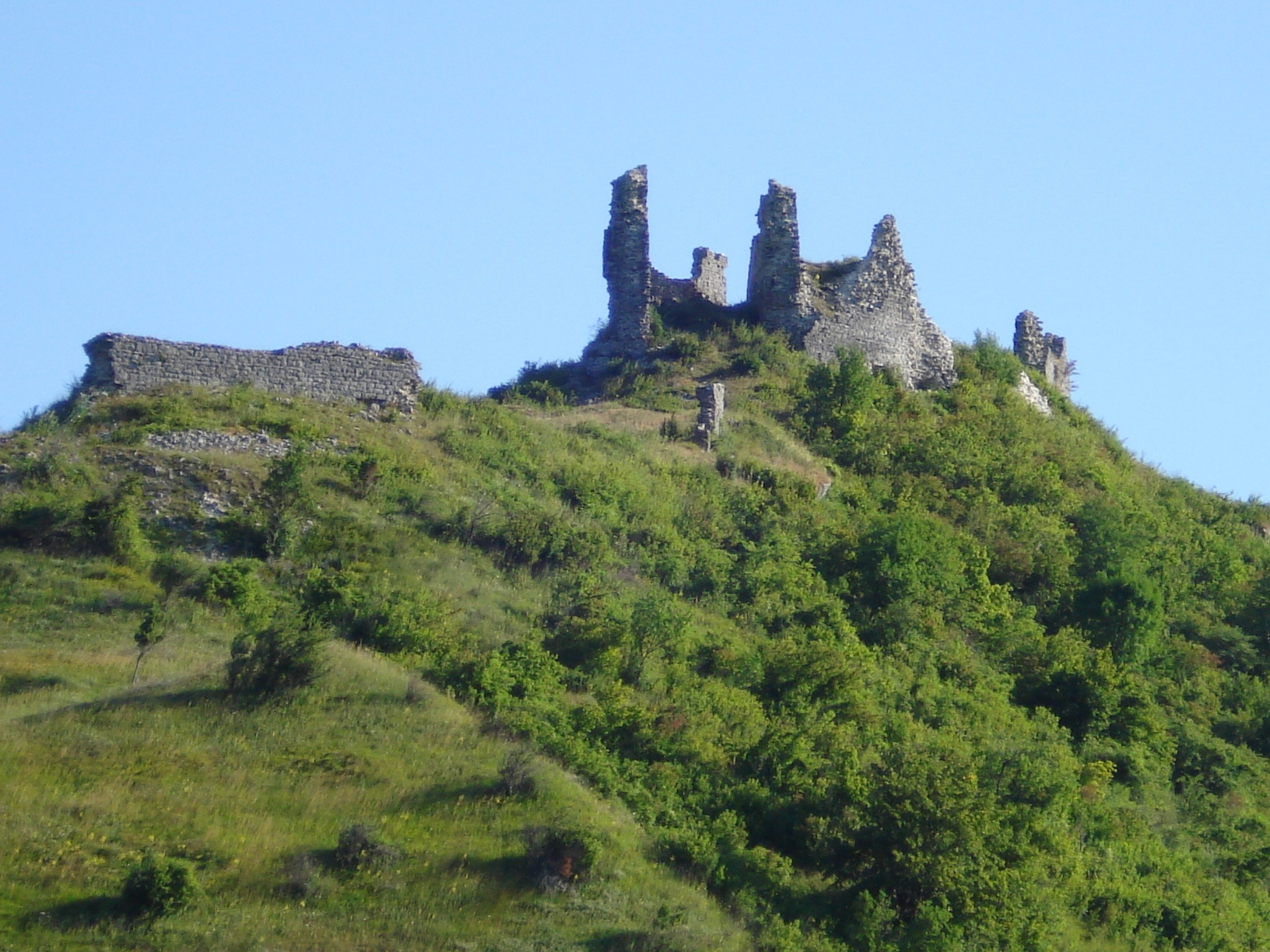
Ruins of Tržan Castle in Modruš, once a seat of the Frankopan family on Croatian mainland

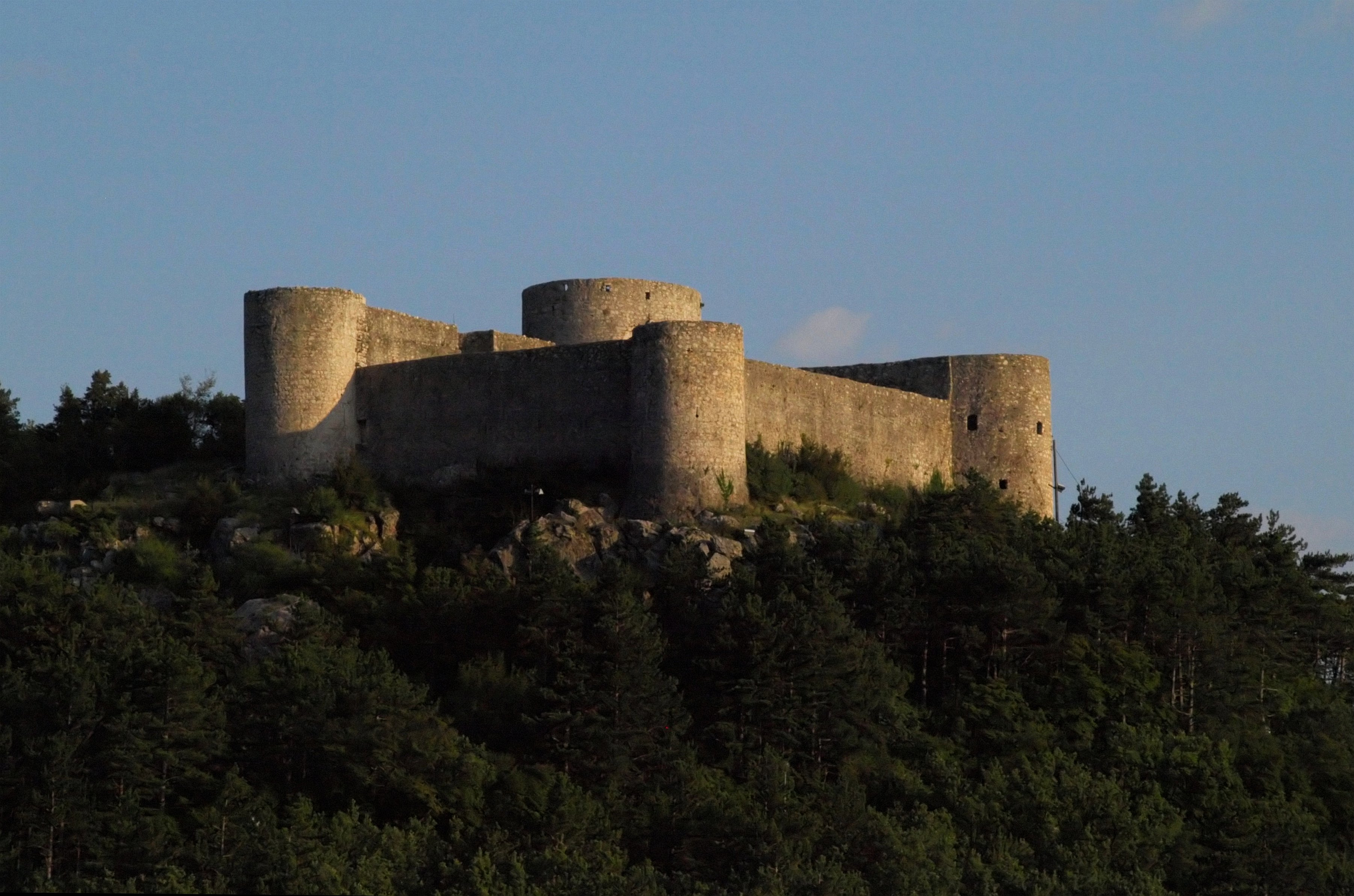
Drivenik Castle near Crikvenica

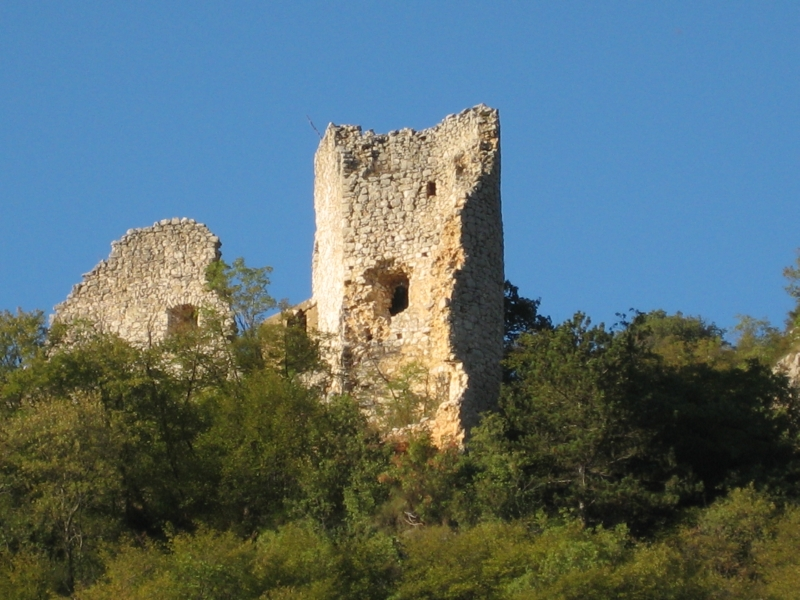
Grižane Castle in Grižane

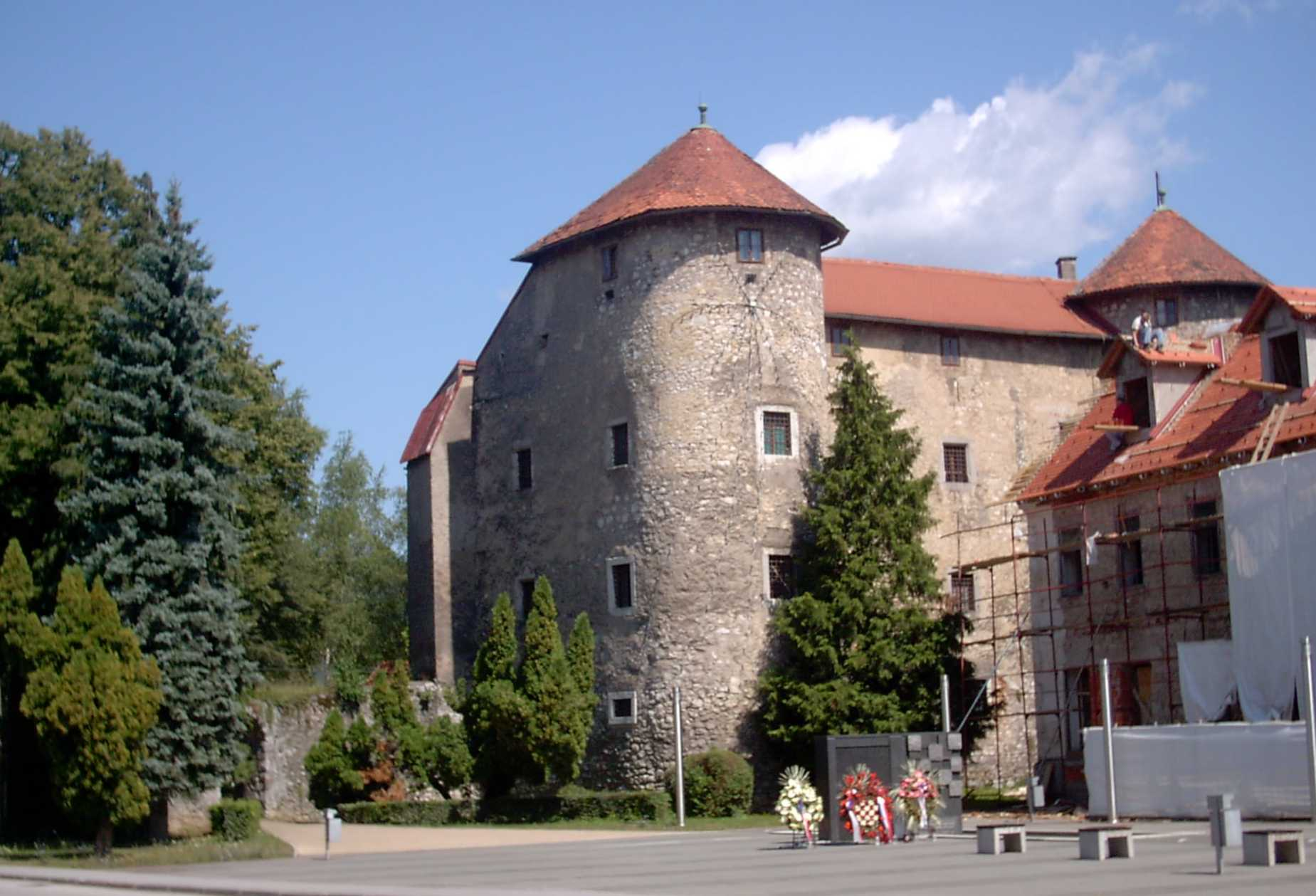
Ogulin Castle in Ogulin

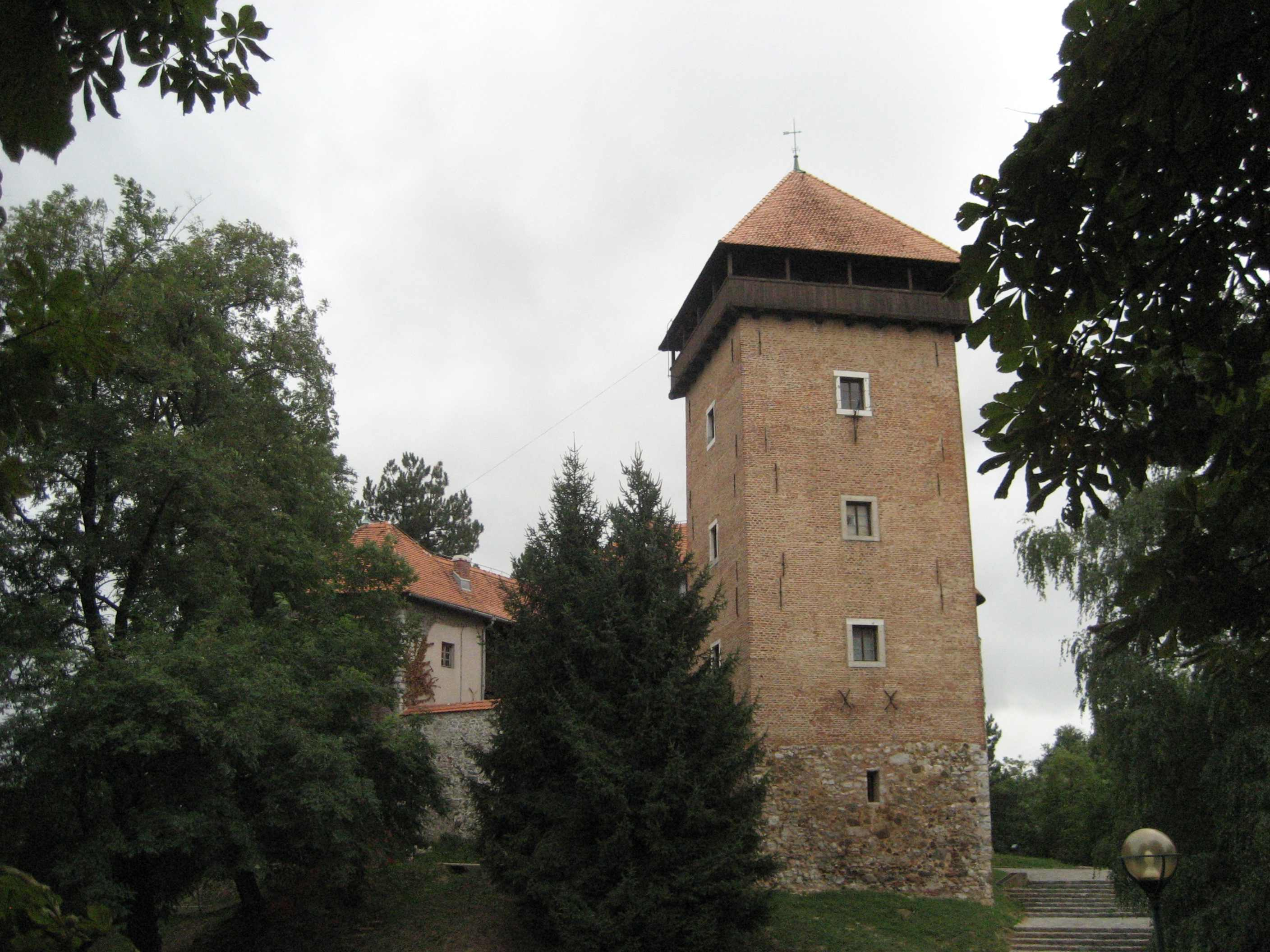
Dubovac Castle at Karlovac

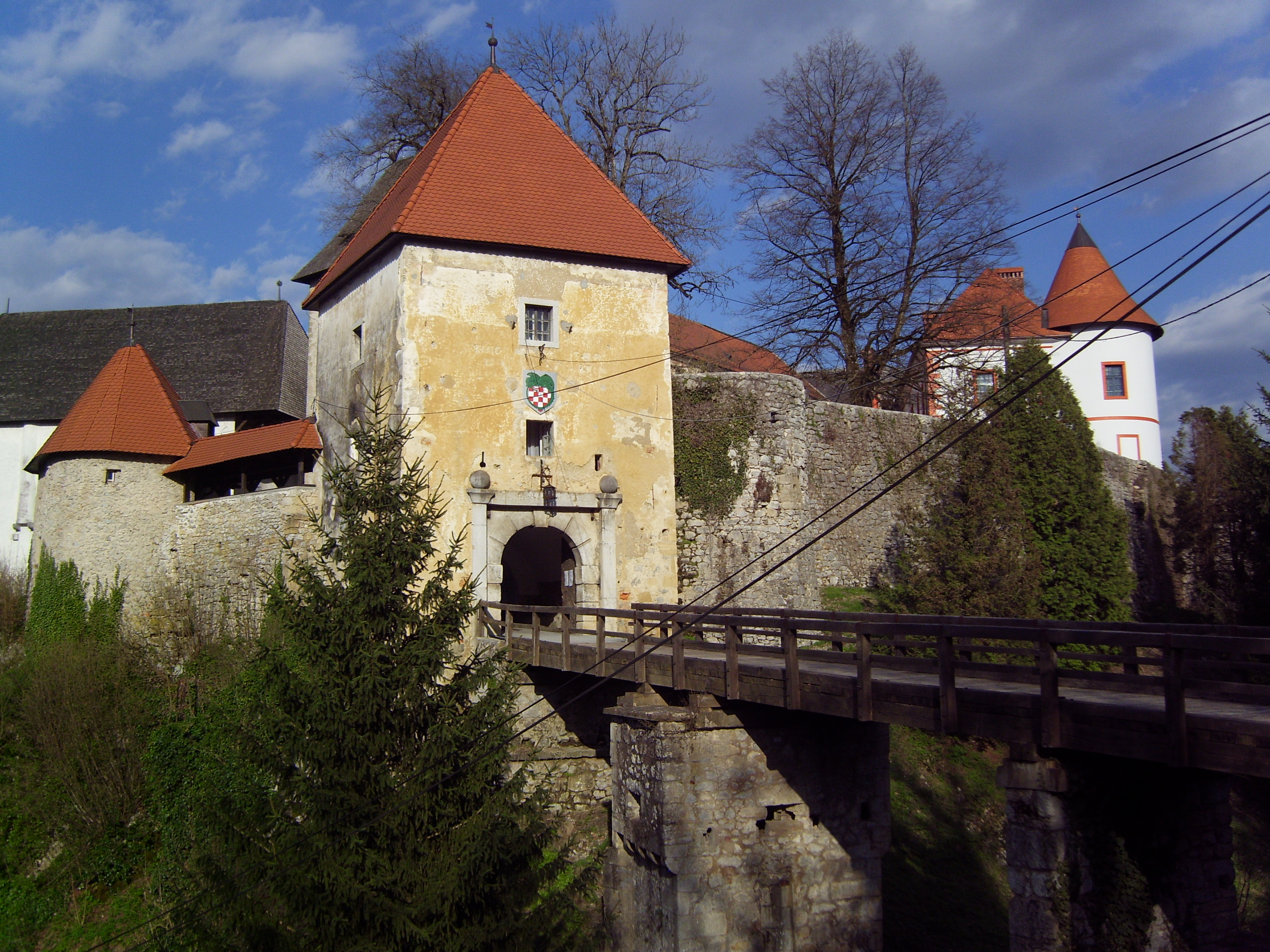
Ozalj Castle in Ozalj

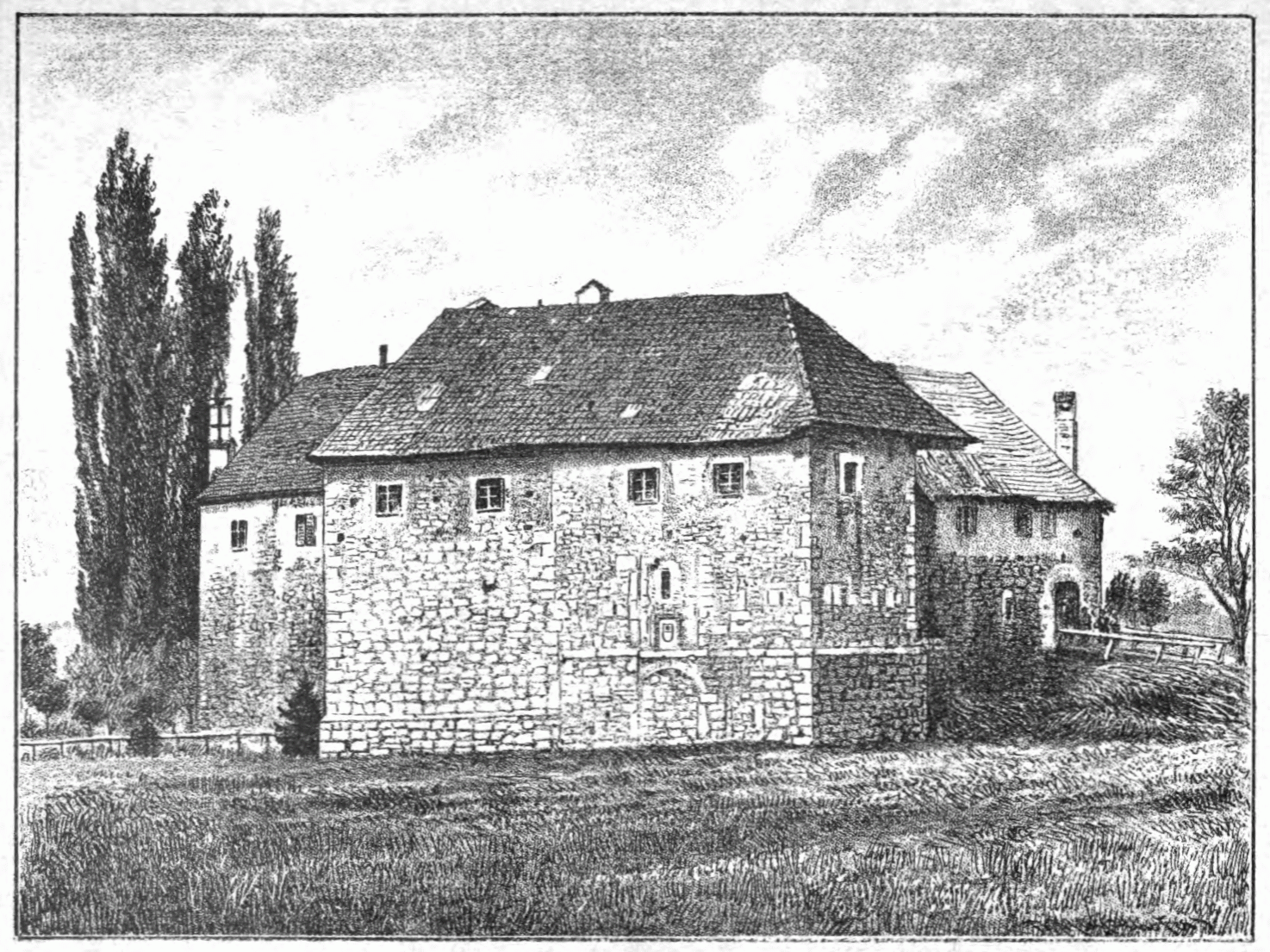
Ribnik Castle in Ribnik

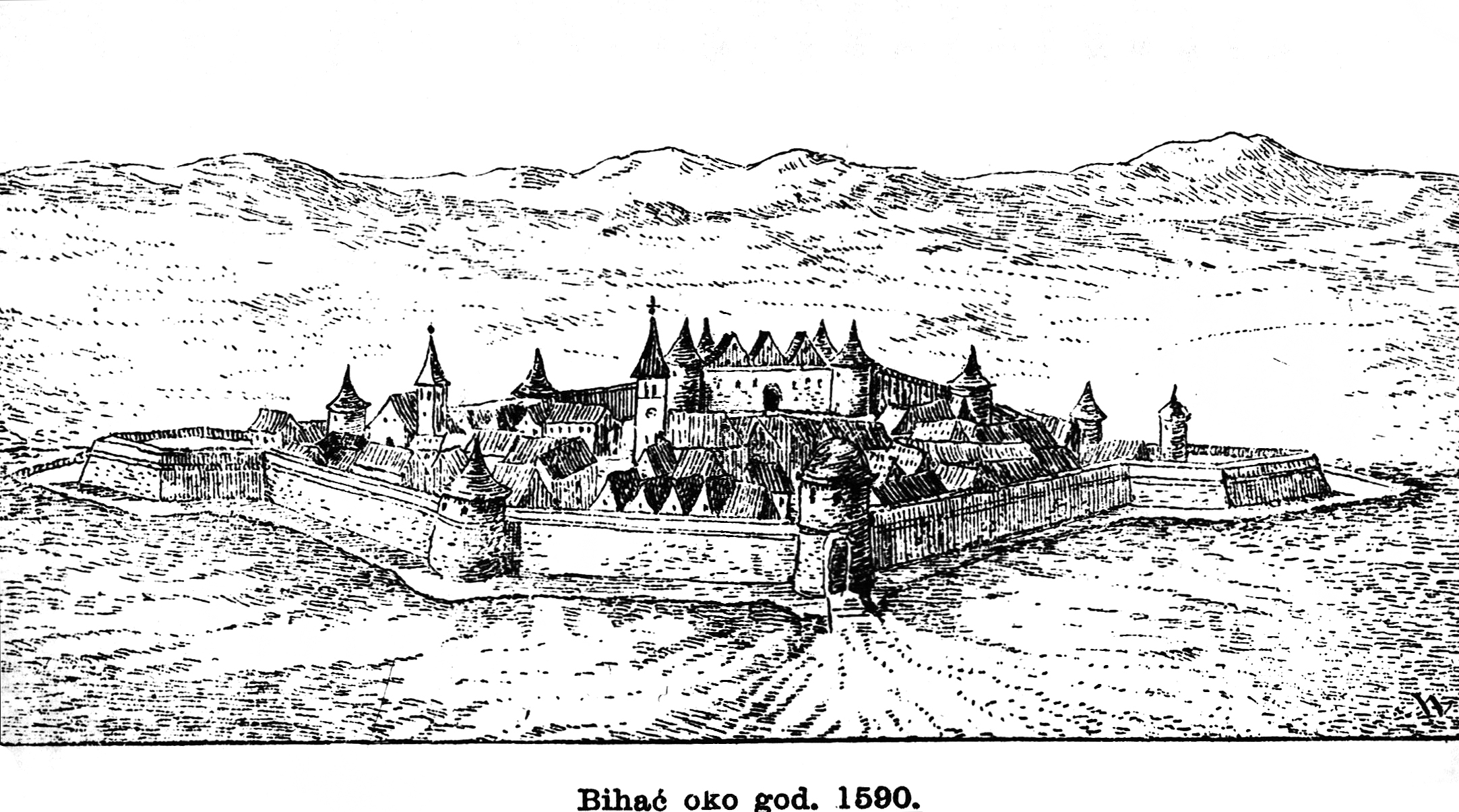
Fortified town of Bihać

== See also ==
- Battle of Krbava Field
- Beatrica Frankopan
- Krsto Frankopan
- Croatian nobility
- House of Frankopan
- Ivaniš Korvin
- Modruš
- Ozalj Castle
- Skrad castle
- Urbarium
- Zvečaj castle

== Bibliography ==
- Kruhek, Milan (2009). "Bernardin Frankopan krčki, senjski i modruški knez — posljednji modruški Europejac hrvatskoga srednjovjekovlja, 1453.–1529" (PDF). Modruški zbornik (in Croatian). 3 (3): 187–235.
