= Zvečaj Castle =

- Donji Zvečaj; Croatia
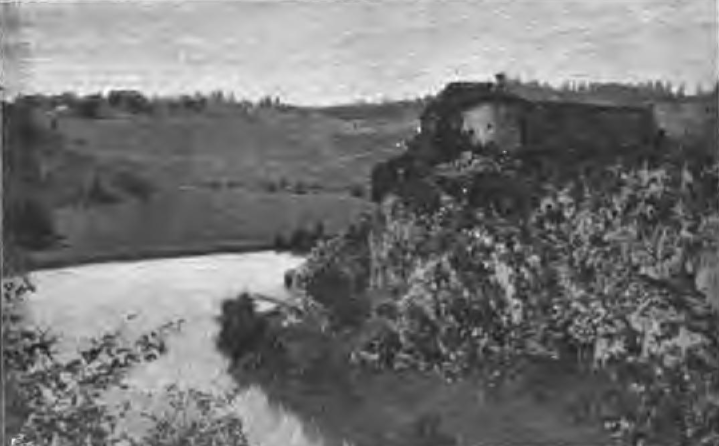
- Zvečaj castle in the late 19th century

Site information
- Type: Castle
- Owner: private
- Open to the public: Yes
- Condition: Ruins

Location
- Coordinates: 45°23′40″N 15°26′05″E

Site history
- Built: mentioned XIV
- Built by: Tomašić family
- Materials: Limestone

Zvečaj (pronounced [zʋeːt͡ʃaj]) is a medieval ruined castle located on the left bank of the Mrežnica river in modern Karlovac county, Croatia. Around it formed an eponymous village, today separated into upper and lower. It has a rectangular floorplan, with a central tower. It survived in good condition much longer than most castles in the region.

== Geography ==
The castle is located about 6 km down the old road from Duga Resa. It is near a rock quarry. The parish church in the 1334 ecclesiastical census was Sv. Juraj in Grabrje across the river from the castle, but that parish vanished, and in the 15th century, the parish church of Sv. Ivan, which still exists, and includes inscriptions from the years 1526, 1587, and 1687, was founded. Radoslav Lopašić infers from the inscriptions and the fact that the Church had been abandoned for 30 years in a 1558 document, that the year inscriptions are years of rebuilding.

== History ==
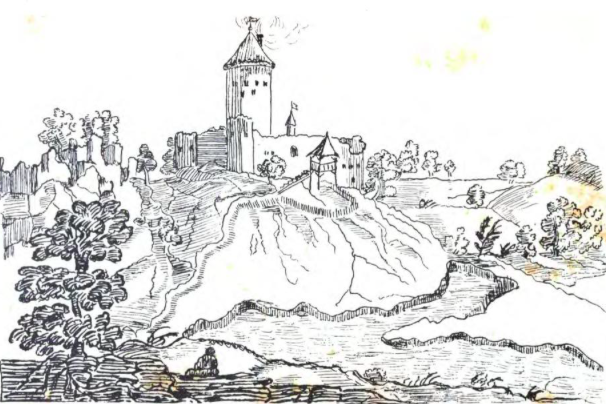
A 1639 military sketch of the castle.

Zvečaj in its early days had its own nobility, originally using the name "od Grabrja" (1334), but later changing it to "od Zvečaja" (1414, 1441) or Zvečaji. Around Zvečaj there lived a number of other low noble families: Tolići, Babinogorci, and Zubci. The last Zvečaj to be lord of the castle was Ivan, who married Katica, the daughter of Nikola Benvenjuda, lord of Skrad, who is mentioned as a widow in 1481. Upon the death of Ivan Zvečaj, the castle and surrounding lands were given to Nikola Frankopan Ozaljski by king Matthias Corvinus.

In 1474, upon the death of Nikola Frankopan's son Bartol, that branch left their heritage to Stjepan Frankopan Modruški, his son Bernardin Frankopan, and his grandson Stjepan Frankopan Ozaljski. In 1558, the castle was pillaged together with the rest of the possessions of Stjepan Ozaljski, yet it had already been abandoned as a result of the Ottoman wars. There were only 38 "sela" (which in medieval times meant a house and its dependencies) in the domain of Zvečaj left. The region btwn the Mrežnica and the Korana was found to be completely abandoned. In 1580, after a legal feud following the death of Stjepan Ozaljski regarding his controversial will, which left his property to the Zrinski family while there was still a branch of the House of Frankopan left, the castle of Zvečaj, together with Novi Vinodolski and Severin, fell to the brothers Frankopan Tržački. In December 1598, a Turkish army 5000 strong hid in ambush near Zvečaj, Juraj Lenković heard about the force, but underestimated its size. He took a smaller army, and when they met, the Turkish army pushed Lenković's back, and many drowned in the Mrežnica, and Stjepan Blagaj was beheaded, ending his family's male line, though Lenković and his men managed to escape, having been in the rear. In 1608, when the brothers divided their property, Zvečaj and Novi went to Vuk. In 1670, after Fran Krsto Frankopan was imprisoned as a result of the Magnate conspiracy, the castle was looted by the army of Karlovac. The Frankopan line died out with the death of Fran Krsto in 1671.

The castle was destroyed in 1777 for the construction of the Josephina. Upon the ruins of the castle walls now sits a private house, built from its stones. All that remains are the walls themselves and parts of the tower. In 2001, the surrounding village had 226 inhabitants, in 74 families.

== See also ==
- List of castles in Croatia
- Military history of Croatia
