= Battle of Krbava Field =

1493 battle of the Hundred Years' Croatian-Ottoman War

- Part of the Ottoman wars in Europe; Hundred Years' Croatian–Ottoman War
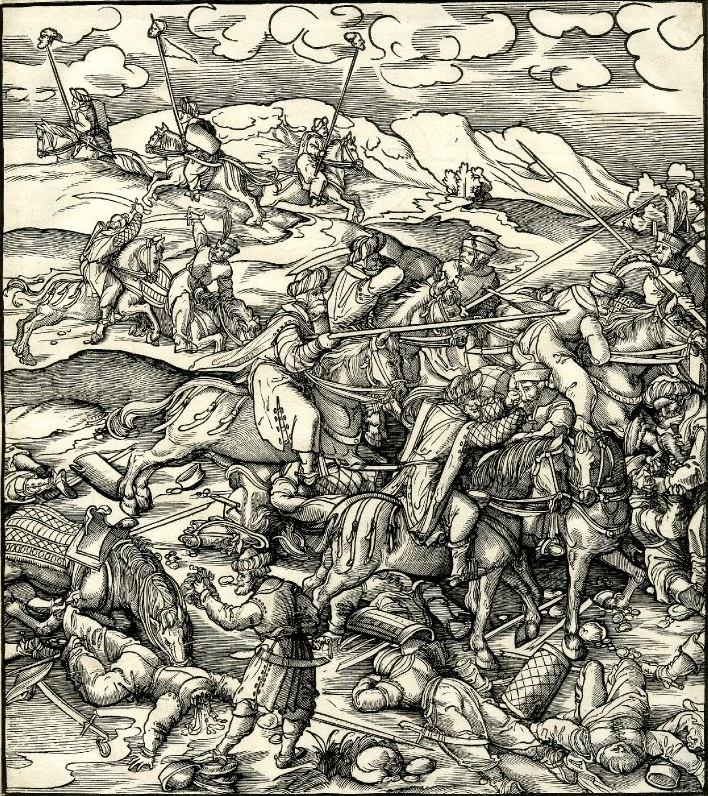
- Der Crabaten slacht, from Weisskunig
Date	9 September 1493
Location	Krbava field, Kingdom of Croatia 44°36′N 15°42′E
Result	Ottoman victory

Belligerents
Ottoman Empire	Kingdom of Croatia

Commanders and leaders
Hadım Yakup Pasha of Bosnia; Ismail Bey of Alaca Hisar; Mehmed Bey of Üsküp	Emerik Derenčin (executed); Bernardin Frankopan; Ivan Frankopan Cetinski †; Nikola VI Frankopan; Franjo Berislavić; Petar II Zrinski †

Strength
8,000–10,000 light cavalry	2,000–3,000 cavalry 8,000 infantry

Casualties and losses
1,000 killed	5,000–7,000 killed 1,500 imprisoned

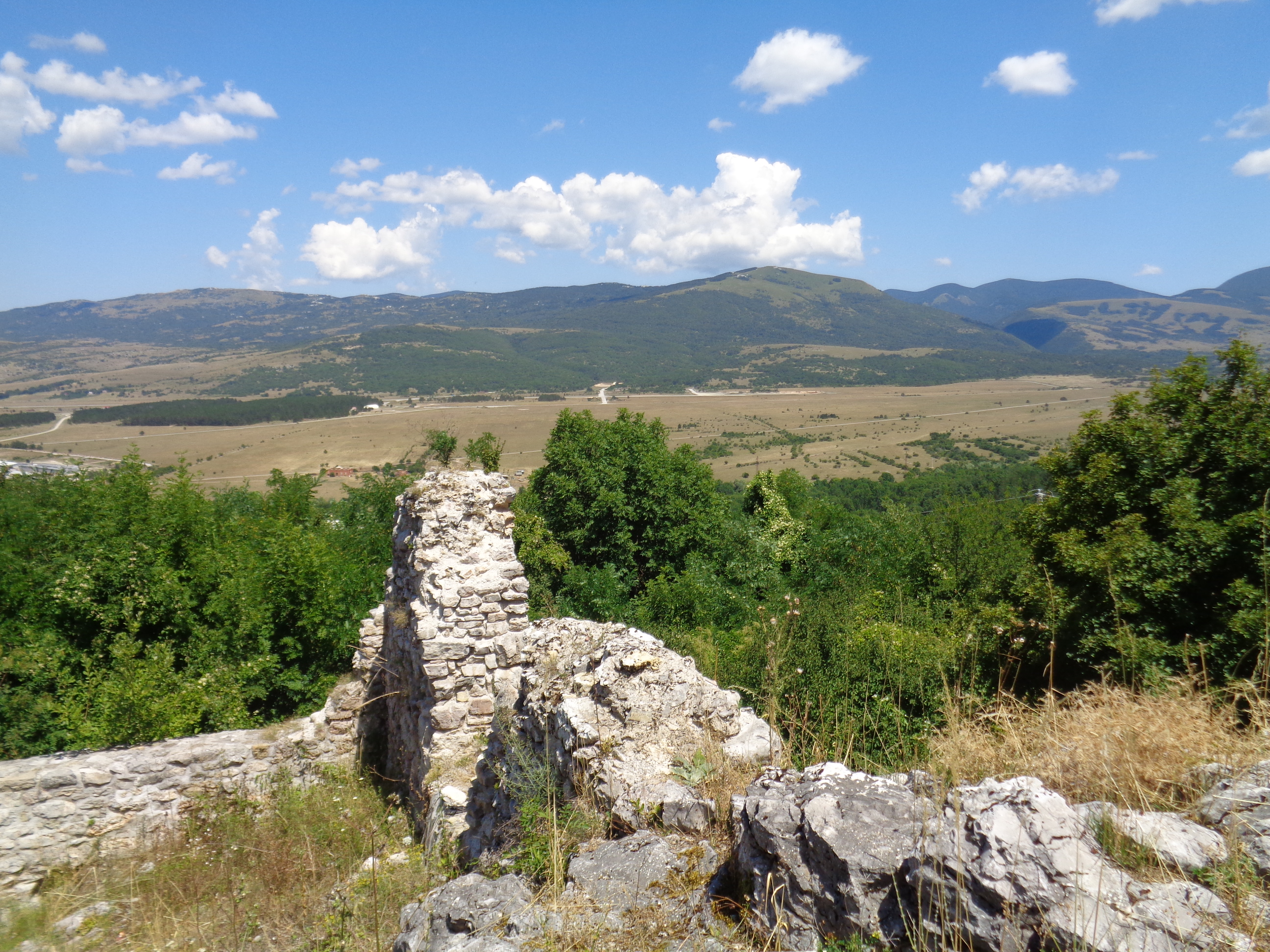
Battlefield as seen from Udbina Castle

The Battle of Krbava Field (Croatian: Bitka na Krbavskom polju, Krbavska bitka; Hungarian: Korbávmezei csata; Turkish: Krbava Muharebesi) was fought between the Ottoman Empire of Bayezid II and an army of the Kingdom of Croatia, at the time in personal union with the Kingdom of Hungary, on 9 September 1493, in the Krbava field, a part of the Lika region in Croatia.

The Ottoman forces were under the command of Hadım Yakup Pasha, sanjak-bey of the Sanjak of Bosnia, and the Croatian army was led by Emerik Derenčin, ban of Croatia, who served under King Vladislaus II Jagiello. Earlier in the summer of 1493, the Ottomans undertook a raid through Croatia into Carniola and Styria. Around the same time, clashes had been raging in Croatia between the House of Frankopan and the Croatian ban, but news of the Ottoman incursion forced them to make peace. The Croatian nobles assembled a large army and intercepted the Ottoman forces that were returning to the Sanjak of Bosnia. Poor tactics, and the choice to fight an open battle made by ban Derenčin against more experienced Ottoman cavalry, resulted in the total defeat of the Croatian army.

There were no immediate territorial gains for the Ottoman Empire, but in the following decades the Ottomans gradually expanded into southern Croatia.

== Background ==
After the fall of the Kingdom of Bosnia into Ottoman hands in 1463, the Ottomans quickly expanded westward, threatening the southern and central parts of the Kingdom of Croatia. Since then, Ottoman raids were becoming more frequent. These raids were being carried out by the Akıncı, irregular light cavalry of the Ottoman Empire. They would ride into Christian territory and plunder the countryside during spring and summer, avoiding the fortified border towns and direct military conflict. These continuous raids forced the local population to abandon their land, leaving the frontier castles without supplies. One such raid began in September 1491, with the Ottoman cavalry crossing the Kupa River and reaching Carniola. On their way back, the Ottomans were intercepted by the army of Croatian ban Ladislav of Egervár and Count Bernardin Frankopan near Udbina, and were defeated in the Battle of Vrpile. The defeat at Vrpile forced the Ottomans to stop their attacks during 1492. After Hadım Yakup Pasha became the sanjak-bey of the Sanjak of Bosnia, the Ottomans renewed their raids.

== Preparations ==
In the summer of 1493, Hadım Yakup Pasha raised an army of 8,000 light cavalry (akıncı) and attacked Jajce, but failed to capture its fortress. From there he turned northwest and entered Carniola and Styria, plundering the countryside. The same year, a war broke out between the newly appointed ban of Croatia, Emerik Derenčin (Hungarian: Imre Derencsényi), and the Frankopans, allied with Karlo Kurjaković (of the Gusić's), for control over Senj and several other towns. By mid-July 1493, counts Bernardin Frankopan and Ivan VIII (Anž) Frankopan, had the upper hand in the war and were besieging Senj. The siege was lifted after an army led by ban Derenčin was sent to help Senj, and the Frankopan army retreated to Sokolac. In the meantime, the Frankopans were accused of cooperating with the Ottomans, although their estates were also being ravaged. News of the incoming Ottoman army forced them to make peace.

On their way back, the Ottomans sacked Modruš, in northern Lika, then owned by the Frankopan noble family. The Frankopans and ban Derenčin wanted to intercept the Ottomans, and gathered an army of around 3,000 cavalry and 8,000 infantry from all parts of Croatia, however a part of the army consisted of peasants from the surrounding areas of Krbava. Ivan Frankopan Cetinski, one of the distinguished Croatian nobles, advocated ambushing the Ottoman army in nearby ravines and canyons. Ban Derenčin, however, as supreme commander, dismissed such idea, accusing Croats of cowardice and opted for a battle on the open field. Cetinski, as written by Tomašić, replied by telling: "This isn't like riding from one town to another in Hungary. Today, you shall see how Turks fight their battles" and accused him back of causing the dissolution of the Croatian Kingdom. Ultimately, Derenčin's opinion prevailed and Croatian commanders agreed to face the Ottoman army in an open battle at the Krbava field, near the town of Udbina in central Croatia, although Ivan Frankopan Cetinski argued that an ambush in the canyons and ravines would be a better option.

== Battle ==
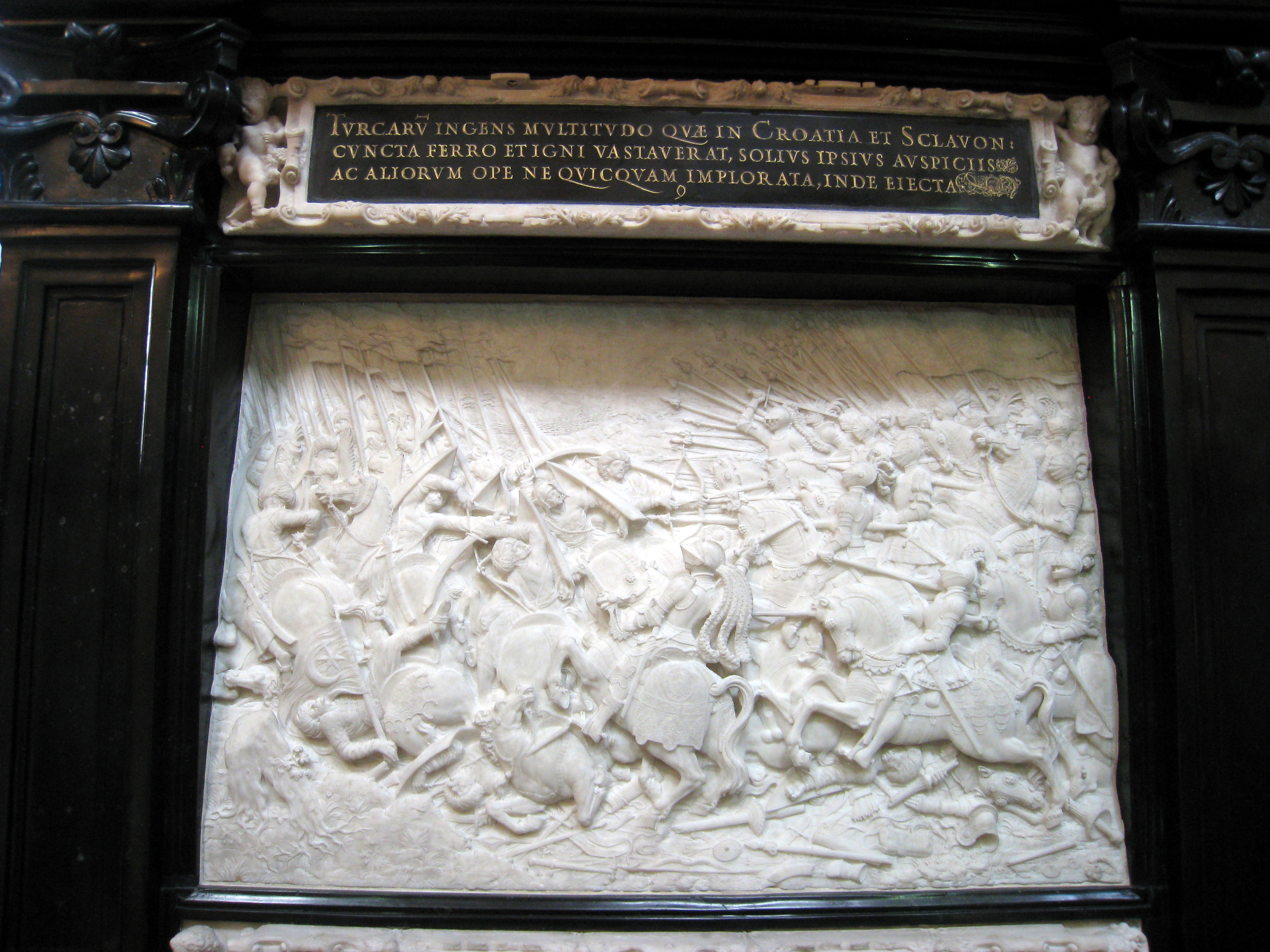
Cenotaph of Maximilian I in Hofkirche, Innsbruck, depicting the Battle of Krbava Field

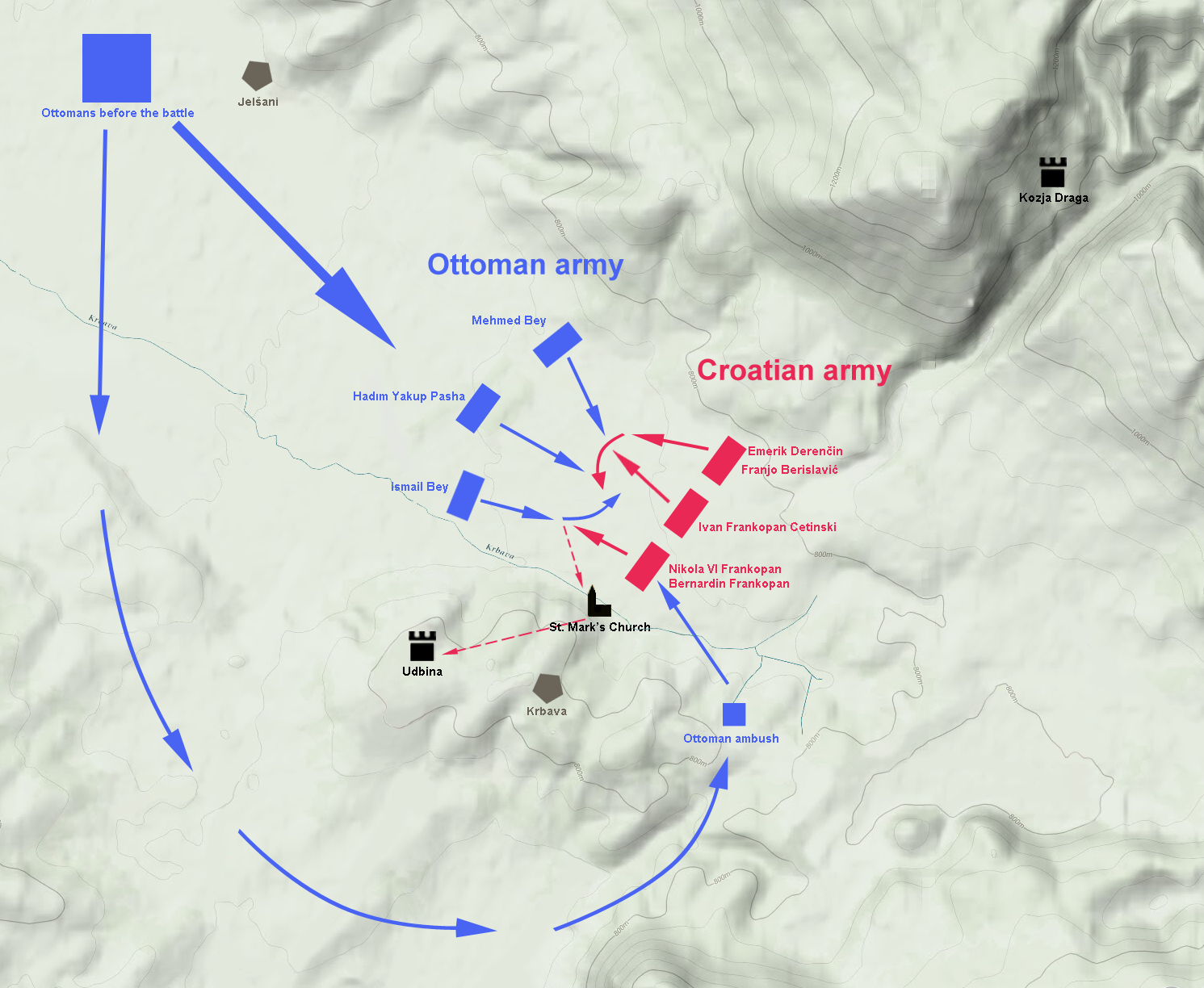
Plan of the battle and troop disposition

The Ottomans entered the Krbava field through the lowest and narrowest local mountain pass of Gorica, unlike two years earlier through the Vrpile pass where they suffered a huge defeat. Before the battle, Hadım Yakup Pasha ordered the execution of Christian captives near Jelšani (present-day Jošan) so that they could not help the Croatians in the midst of battle. Turkish historian H. E. Efendi, also notes that he held "a heated speech" to his men in order to "invoke their wrath against the enemies of The Only God". After a meeting with the commanders, he sent a part of his army, around 3,000 cavalrymen, to set up an ambush in the forest near the Krbava field.

Although the plan was to fight the Ottomans on the open plains, the Croatian army was initially deployed on the slopes of the eastern part of the Krbava field, near the village of Visuć. The army was set up to face the enemy frontally, and divided into three groups. The first one was composed of soldiers from Slavonia, commanded by Franjo Berislavić, the second section was under the command of Ivan Frankopan Cetinski, while the third was commanded by Nikola VI Frankopan and Bernardin Frankopan. Croatian infantry and cavalry were equally distributed among the three sections. The main commander of the army was ban Emerik Derenčin. The Ottoman army was also arranged in three groups. The first one was commanded by Ismail Bey, sanjak-bey of the Sanjak of Kruševac, the second one by Mehmed Bey of the Sanjak of Üsküp (Skopje), while the middle group was under the command of Hadım Yakup Pasha. Ishak Bey Kraloğlu (Sigismund of Bosnia), son of the King of Bosnia, Stephen Thomas (died 1461), also took part in the battle on the Ottoman side.

The Ottoman plan was to draw the Croatian forces further west next to the woods where they had set up an ambush. Ismail's right wing made the first move, heading towards the Croatian left flank. The Croatian army left the slopes and rushed at the Ottomans, starting a battle in the open field. The battle was fought closely with swords, with no use of bows. The Ottoman forces were at first pushed back, and started a feigned retreat, which lured Croatian army into pursuit that led them into the ambush.

The 3,000 Ottoman cavalrymen located in the wooded area of the Krbava field crossed the Krbava River and attacked the Croatian rear. Then the main Ottoman forces of Hadım Yakup Pasha, also waiting hidden in the forests, commenced a frontal attack. Thus, the Croatian army was attacked from the front, right, and the rear. The Croatian left flank of Bernardin Frankopan could not withstand the attacks of the Turkish light cavalry and began retreating. However, most of the Croatian infantry was surrounded and could not retreat. The Croatian army suffered a total defeat and only a small number of men managed to reach safety in the nearby fortified town of Udbina.

The battle started around 09:00 and ended in the afternoon hours. According to H. E. Efendi, in battle climax, Derenčin went into a duel with one of the akinjis who struck him off his horse, only to be dragged off to Pasha with rope tied around his hands and neck. Pasha then had him shackled up and paraded next to killed and captured Croatian soldiers, whose ears and noses he had ordered to be cut off. Derenčin died in captivity, while his brother, and his son Pavao, were killed in battle. Nikola VI Frankopan Tržački was also captured, but was ransomed and released. Among the killed Croatian nobles were Ivan Frankopan Cetinski, Petar II Zrinski, Juraj Vlatković, and ban of Jajce Mihajlo Pethkey. Count Bernardin Frankopan and Franjo Berislavić managed to survive the battle.

== Aftermath ==
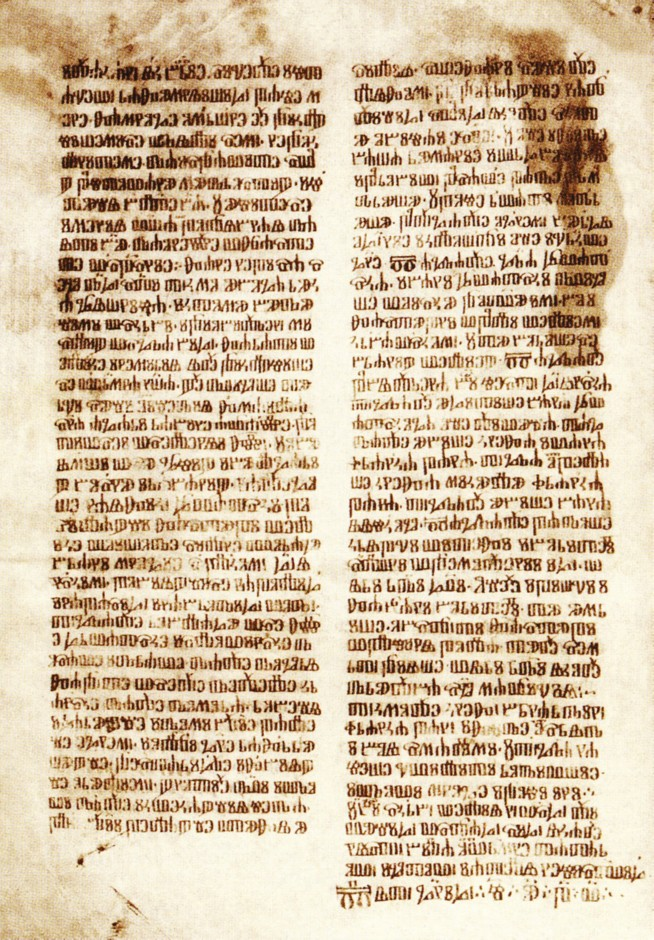
One of the oldest records of the battle, written by priest Martinac in Glagolitic script on 27 September 1493

Although the Croatian nobility suffered a heavy defeat, described by older historians and chroniclers as the "first dissolution of the Croatian Kingdom", the Ottoman Empire had no territorial gains as a result of the victory at Krbava field. Since the losses were heavy, in local tradition the Krbava field became known as the "Field of Blood" (Croatian: Krvavo polje). Peace between the kingdoms of Croatia and Hungary and the Ottoman Empire was signed in April 1495. The next major Ottoman incursions occurred in 1512 and in 1513, and resulted in the Croatian victory at the battle of Dubica. Following the battle, and in later decades, due to constant Ottoman attacks, local Croatian populations moved into safer areas; north-west Croatia, the coast and the islands, and also outside the country. Franjo Berislavić became the ban of Jajce in 1494.

== Historical records ==
Accounts of the Battle of Krbava field have been recorded in various modern and older historical sources. Among the oldest ones are the report of the papal delegate Antonio Fabregues written on 13 September 1493, in Senj, a record from the Bohemian traveler Jan Hasištejnský on 23 September 1493, in his travel book, the account by the Glagolite priest Martinac in the Novi Vinodolski Breviary in 1493, and the account of the battle written in a letter to Pope Alexander VI by the Nin Bishop Juraj Divnić on 27 September 1493. In 1561, the battle of Krbava field was described by the chronicler Ivan Tomašić in his Brief Chronicle of the Croatian Kingdom (Chronicon breve Regni Croatiae), and in 1696, Pavao Ritter Vitezović described it in Kronika aliti szpomen vszega szvieta vikov. From the Ottoman side, the battle was recorded by Ottoman historian Hoca Sadeddin Efendi in his Crown of Histories. The numbers for involved soldiers and casualties given in older historical sources are mostly exaggerated. Since news of the defeat spread quickly, the reports written immediately after the battle were made under the impression of the heavy loss.

== See also ==
- Hundred Years' Croatian–Ottoman War
- Udbina Castle

== Bibliography ==
- Goldstein, Ivo (1997). "Značaj Krbavske bitke 1493. godine u hrvatskoj povijesti". In Pavličević, Dragutin (ed.). Krbavska bitka i njezine posljedice (in Croatian). Zagreb: Croatian Heritage Foundation & Department of Croatian History, Faculty of Humanities and Social Sciences, University of Zagreb. pp. 22–27. ISBN 9789536525119.
- Goldstein, Ivo (1999). Croatia: A History. C. Hurst & Co. ISBN 978-1850655251.
- Kekez, Hrvoje (2009). "Bernardin Frankapan i Krbavska bitka: je li spasio sebe i malobrojne ili je pobjegao iz boja?" (PDF). Modruški zbornik (in Croatian). 3 (3): 65–101.
- Klaić, Vjekoslav (1988). Povijest Hrvata od najstarijih vremena do svršetka XIX. stoljeća (in Croatian). Vol. IV. Zagreb.
- Mažuran, Ive (1998). Povijest Hrvatske od 15. stoljeća do 18. stoljeća (in Croatian).
- Mijatović, Anđelko (2005). Bitka na Krbavskom polju 1493. godine (in Croatian). Zagreb: Školska knjiga. ISBN 953-0-61429-2.
- Pavličević, Dragutin, ed. (1997). Krbavska bitka i njezine posljedice (in Croatian). Zagreb: Croatian Heritage Foundation & Department of Croatian History, Faculty of Humanities and Social Sciences, University of Zagreb. ISBN 978-9536525119.
