= Modruš =

Village in Croatia

- Location within Croatia
- Coordinates: 45°07′N 15°14′E

Area
  - Total: 43.9 km^{2} (16.9 sq mi)

Population (2021)
  - Total: 125
  - Density: 2.85/km^{2} (7.37/sq mi)

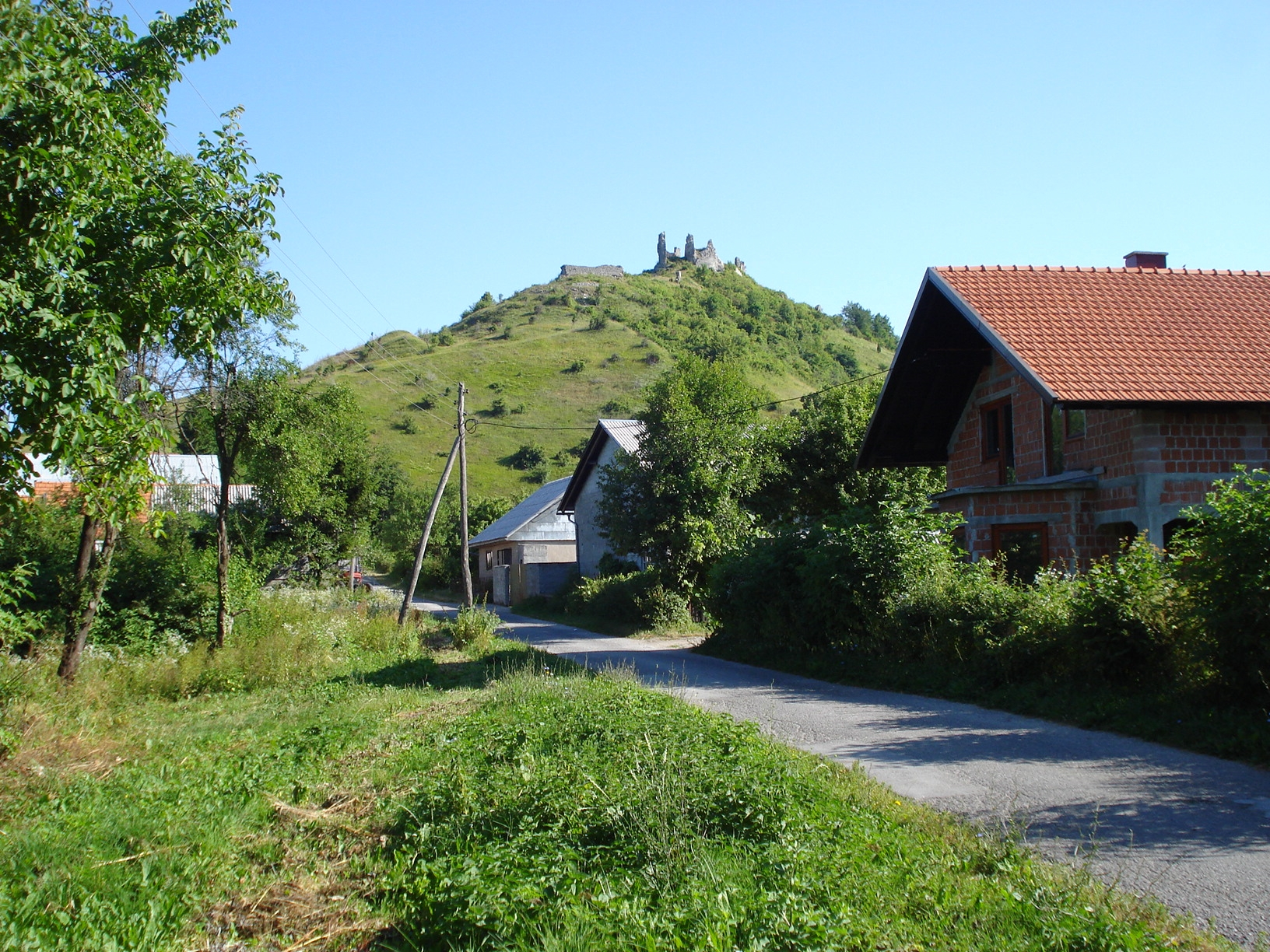
Part of present-day village with the ruins of Tržan castle in the background

Modruš is a village, former episcopal see, and current Latin Church Catholic titular see in Western Croatia. It is located south of its municipality's seat Josipdol (Karlovac County), on the easternmost slopes of Velika Kapela mountain, in northern Lika.

The population was 169 in the census of 2011.

== History ==
One of the counties in the Kingdom of Croatia-Slavonia (an autonomous kingdom within the Hungarian part of Austria-Hungary) was named Modruš-Rijeka County, partially after the town.

The fortress may have already existed in 1209. The town around it developed during the 14th and 15th centuries.

From 1193 until 1553, Modruš and the large surrounding estate was owned by members of the Frankopan noble family, who were living in the Tržan castle above the medieval settlement.

In 1460, Modruš became the seat of the Roman Catholic Diocese of Krbava-Modruš.

Modruš was mentioned on 22 February 1481, in a document freeing the citizens of Grič from tariffs, in Modruš and elsewhere.

In 1553, Modruš came under the administration of the Military Frontier authorities.

At 13:00 on 22 June 1942, a Partisan attack was carried out from Deriguz on Modruš. The forester Josip Rendulić was wounded at Deriguz and transported to Sisak. But the attack was repelled.

== Ecclesiastical history ==
- During the 1460s, due to the Ottoman (Turkish) advance in Dalmatia, the medieval Catholic Diocese of Corbavia (established in 1185 at Udbina, in Krbava region -hence the name-, including the county of Modruš) was formally suppressed by Pope Pius II, but its territory immediately reassigned to establish as successor see the Diocese of Modruš (Croatian = Curiate Italian) / Modrussa / Modrussen(sis) (Latin), named after its new see, near Fiume (Rijeka), at the rock fortress of the Frankopan counts (now in the comune Josipdol). Again it was a suffragan of the Metropolitan Archdiocese of Spalato (Split).
- Due to a Croat defeat against the Turks at Udbina in (1493), the episcopal see was again transferred, now to Novi Vinodolski (Italian Novi in Valdivino), south-east of Fiume, but kept Modruš as its title.
- Turkish raids having devastated the nearly-abandoned bishopric since the 1560s, its administration was vested in the nearby Diocese of Segna, and in 1630 Pope Urban VIII united both sees per aequalitatem jurium in personal union, formally remaining separate suffragans of Spalato, as confirmed in 1833 by papal bulla from Gregory XVI. They became known (informally, incorrectly) as the Roman Catholic Diocese of Senj-Modruš.
- By the 19th century, besides the cathedral little survived the Turkish rule, except its Chapter of Canons, divided in three parts residing in the diocese's last parishes : Novi itself, Bribir and Buccari.
- In the first half of the 18th century, Segna and Modruš became suffragans in the ecclesiastical province of the Hungarian Archdiocese of Kalocsa, then from 8 March 1788 suffragans of the Slovenian Archdiocese of Ljubljana, but 19 August 1807 returned to Kalocsa, until 11 December 1852 they became part of the ecclesiastical province of the Croatian Archdiocese of Zagreb.
- On 27 July 1969 by Paul VI's papal bulla 'Coetu intante', Modruš was united with the Diocese of Rijeka–Opatija (Fiume in Italian), which was elevated to Metropolitan archbishopric and renamed Archdiocese of Rijeka–Senj (Fiume-Segna), by privilege bearing the 'additional' title Bishops of Modruš.

=== Residential Bishops of Modruš ===
Suffragan Bishops of Modruš:

- Niccolò di Cattaro (October 1461 – 1466 – ?)
- Antonio (1481 – ?)
- Cristoforo da Ragusa (1480.05.29 – death 1498?99)
- Giacomo Dragazio (12 April 1499 – death 1499.09.07)
- Simone de Begno (1509.11.07 – death 1536.03)
- Pierpaolo Vergerio (1536.05.05 – 1536.09.06), previously Apostolic Nuncio (papal ambassador) to Austria-Hungary (1533 – 1535); later Bishop of Koper (Capodistria, Slovenia) (1536.09.06 – retired 1549.07.03), died 1565
- Ermolao Ermolai, Observant Franciscans (O.F.M. Obs.) (1536.11.06 – death 1537)
- Giovanni Evangelista Brachi, Benedictine Order (O.S.B.) (1537.08.17 – death 1537?38)
- Diego de Loaysa, Recollect Augustinians (O.A.R.) (1538.03.11 – resigned 1549)
- Alberto Divini = Gliričić,, Dominican Order (O.P.) (1549.07.26 – 1550.03.19), next Bishop of Krk (Veglia, Croatia) (1550.03.19 – 1564) and Apostolic Administrator of Diocese of Skradin (1550.03.19 – death 1564)
- Lorenzo Gherardi, O.P. (1550.06.20 – ?)
- See administered by Diocese of Veglia (Krk) (?-1560)
- Dionigi Pieppi, O.P. (1560.07.17 – 1561)
- Jovan Kosisić (mentioned in 1564)
- See administered by Diocese of Segna (Senj)

From 1630, due to the sees' personal union, see Diocese of Senj (Segna).

=== Titular see ===
The diocese was nominally restored in 2000 as Latin Titular bishopric of Modruš (Croatian = Curiate Italian) / Modrussa / Modrussen(sis) (Latin).

It has had the following incumbents, so far of the fitting Episcopal (lowest) rank :

- Dominick John Lagonegro (2001.10.30 – ...), as Auxiliary Bishop of Archdiocese of New York (USA) (2001.10.30 – ...).

== Demographics ==
In 1895, the obćina of Modruš (court at Modruš Gornji), with an area of 109 square kilometres (42 mi^{2}), belonged to the kotar of Ogulin (Ogulin court but Plaški electoral district) in the županija of Modruš-Rieka (Ogulin high court and financial board). There were 520 houses, with a population of 3879. Its 14 villages and 39 hamlets were divided for taxation purposes into 2 porezne obćine, under the Ogulin office.

== Infrastructure ==
In 1913, there were 8 gendarmeries in Delnice kotar: Ogulin, Drežnica, Generalski Stol, Jasenak, Saborsko, Josipdol, Modruš and Plaški.

== Notable locals ==
- Bernardin Frankopan
- Krsto (Christopher) Frankopan
- Beatrica Frankopan
- Nicholas of Modruš

== See also ==
- List of Catholic dioceses in Croatia
- Battle of Krbava field
- Urbarium

== Sources and external links ==
- Modruš – a part of the Croatian glagolitic heritage
- GCatholic - former & titular diocese
- History of Modruš
- Historical Diocese of Modruš

== Bibliography ==
=== Genealogy ===
- Salopek, Hrvoje (1999). Stari rodovi Ogulinsko - modruške udoline : podrijetlo, povijest, rasprostranjenost, seobe i prezimena stanovništva Ogulina, Oštarija, Josipdola, Zagorja Ogulinskog, Modruša i okolnih naselja (in Serbo-Croatian). Ogulin, Zagreb: Matica hrvatska, Centar za kulturu, Hrvatska matica iseljenika. ISBN 953-6525-18-6. 2nd ed. 2000, ISBN 953-6525-18-6.
- Salopek, Hrvoje (2007). Ogulinsko - modruški rodovi: podrijetlo, povijest, rasprostranjenost, seobe i prezimena stanovništva ogulinskog kraja (in Serbo-Croatian). Ogulin, Zagreb: Matica hrvatska, Hrvatska matica iseljenika, Hrvatsko rodoslovno društvo "Pavao Ritter Vitezović". ISBN 978-953-6525-45-4.

=== Ecclesiastical history ===
- Pius Bonifacius Gams, Series episcoporum Ecclesiae Catholicae, Leipzig 1931, pp. 388–389, 399
- Dictionnaire d'Histoire et de Géographie ecclésiastiques, vol. XIII, 1956, coll. 805-806
- K. Draganovic, Croazia sacra, Rome 1943, pp. 197–198
- 'Stato della diocesi a fine Ottocento' in Acta Sanctae Sedis, 9 (1876), pp. 292–293
- Bulla 'Apostolici nostri', in Iuris pontificii de propaganda fide, vol. V, pp. 62–64
- Bulla Coetu instante, on vatican.va.
- Konrad Eubel, Hierarchia Catholica Medii Aevi, vol. 1, p. 208; vol. 2, p. 136; vol. 3, p. 247; vol. 4, p. 309
- Draganović, Krunoslav; Bezić, Srećko [in Croatian]; Crnković, Josip; Lešnik, Rafael; Mršo, Ivan [in Croatian]; Reven, Zdravko [in Slovenian]; Weber, Hinko (1975-05-05). Opći šematizam Katoličke Crkve u Jugoslaviji 1974 [General Directory of the Catholic Church in Yugoslavia 1974] (in Serbo-Croatian). Zagreb: Hrvatsko književno društvo sv. Ćirila i Metoda.

=== Military history ===
- Kruhek, Milan (1976). Stari gradovi između Kupe i Korane [Old Castles Between the Kupa and the Korana] (PDF) (in Croatian).
- Trgo, Fabijan, ed. (1964). Zbornik dokumenata i podataka o Narodno-oslobodilačkom ratu Jugoslovenskih naroda. Vol. V, 32.
- Fras, Franz Julius (1835). "Modrusser-Kompagnie" [Modruš Company]. Vollständige Topographie der Karlstädter-Militärgrenze mit besonderer Rücksicht auf die Beschreibung der Schlösser, Ruinen, Inscriptionen und andern dergleichen Ueberbleibseln von Antiquitäten: nach Anschauung und aus den zuverlässigsten Quellen dargestellt für reisende, und zur Förderung der Vaterlandsliebe (in German). Zagreb: Franz Suppan. pp. 290–298.

=== Modruš urbarium ===
- Lopašić, Radoslav (1894). "Urbar Modruški od g. 1486" [The Modruš Urbarium of the Year 1486]. Hrvatski urbari. Monumenta historico-iuridica Slavorum meridionalium (in Croatian). Vol. 5, 1. pp. 20–81.
  - Republished: Lopašić, Radoslav (1997). Abramović, Ignacije (ed.). Urbar modruški [The Modruš Urbarium] (in Croatian). Ogulin: Ogranak Matice hrvatske. ISBN 953-96393-4-4. Tirage: 500.
