= Nicholas of Modruš =

Roman Catholic bishop, writer

Nicholas of Modruš (Croatian: Nikola Modruški/Kotarski, c. 1427 – 1480), born in Boka Kotorska, was a bishop of Modruš in Lika, the Pope's representative at the courts of King Stephen Tomašević of Bosnia and King Matthias Corvinus of Hungary (1463–1464). His huge library was left to the newly founded Vatican library (founded by Pope Sixtus IV). In 1478/79, he wrote a treatise in defence of the Glagolitic alphabet which he sent from Rome to the Modruš bishopric. It is regarded to be the first polemic treatise in the history of Croatian literature, and it was written in the Glagolitic Script. He is buried in the church of Santa Maria del Popolo in Rome.

== Works ==
- Dialogus de mortalium felicitate (1464)
- De titulis et auctoribus Psalmorum (1465)
- De consolatione (1466)
- De bellis Gothorum (1474)
- De humilitate
- Defensio ecclesiasticae libertatis (1479)

== Sources ==
- Nikola Modruški (in Croatian)
