= Ive Mažuran =

Croatian historian

Ive Mažuran (1928–2016) was a Croatian historian.

Mažuran was a longtime editor at the Školska knjiga publishing house where he edited several hundred textbooks and research publications. He also published some 100 research papers and about 20 books of his own work. His scholarly interest was focused primarily on the history of the city of Osijek and the surrounding region of Slavonia in eastern Croatia, especially during the Ottoman rule period (between the 16th and 18th century). His magnum opus is considered to be his book Hrvati i Osmansko carstvo (English: Croats and the Ottoman Empire) published in 1998.

He died in 2016, aged 89.

== Selected works ==
- Mažuran, Ive (2000). Grad i tvrđava Osijek (in Croatian). Osijek: Grafika. ISBN 953-6711-00-1.
- Mažuran, Ive (14 January 2010). "Tvrđa: ishodište Osijeka". Vijenac (in Croatian). 414. Zagreb: Matica hrvatska. ISSN 1330-2787.
