= Mala Kladuša =

- Village
- Location within Bosnia and Herzegovina
- Coordinates: 45.132368°N 15.860226°E
- Country: Bosnia and Herzegovina
- Entity: Federation of Bosnia and Herzegovina
- Canton: Una-Sana Canton
- Municipality: Velika Kladuša

Area
  - Total: 1.97 sq mi (5.10 km^{2})

Population (2013)
  - Total: 1,003
  - Density: 509/sq mi (197/km^{2})
- Time zone: UTC+1 (CET)
  - Summer (DST): UTC+2 (CEST)

Mala Kladuša is a village in the municipality of Velika Kladuša, Bosnia and Herzegovina.

== Demographics ==
According to the 2013 census, its population was 1,003.

Ethnicity in 2013
Ethnicity	Number	Percentage
Bosniaks	691	68.90%
Bosnians	167	16.66%
Muslims	101	10.07%
other/undeclared	44	4.39%
Total	1,003	100%

== Footnotes ==
=== Books ===
- Ethnicity/National Affiliation, Religion and Mother Tongue (PDF). Sarajevo: Agency for Statistics of Bosnia and Herzegovina. 2019.
