= Battle of Vrpile =

1491 conflict in Croatian-Ottoman War

- Part of the Ottoman wars in Europe; Hundred Years' Croatian–Ottoman War
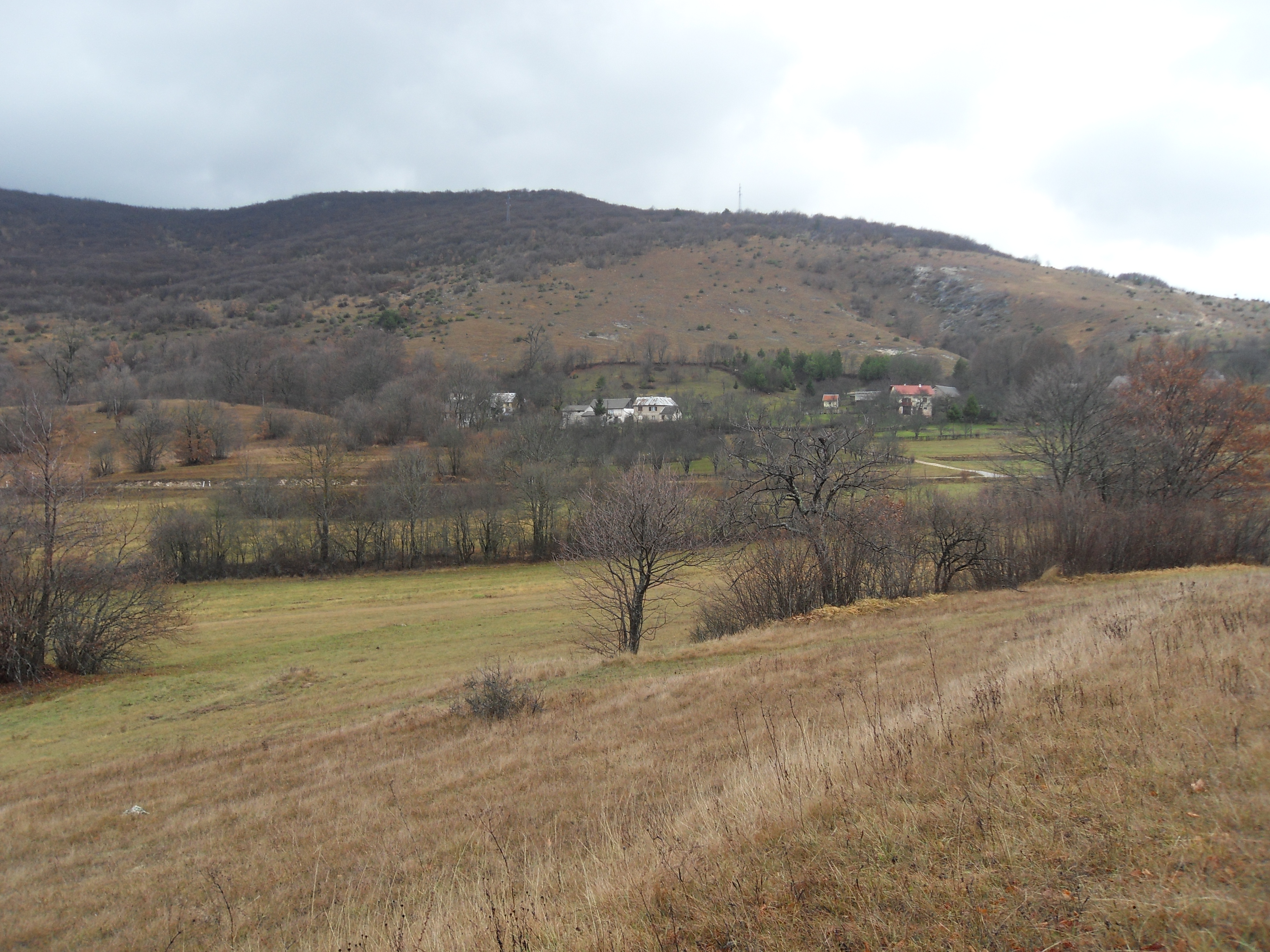
- Present-day Vrpile
Date	Early September, 1491
Location	Vrpile pass (Vrpile gulch), Lika, Kingdom of Croatia
Result	Croatian victory

Belligerents
Ottoman Empire	Kingdom of Croatia

Commanders and leaders
Mihaloğlu Hasan Bey	Ladislav of Egervár; Bernardin Frankopan; Ivan Frankopan Cetinski; Mihovil Frankopan Slunjski

Strength
10,000–11,000; Irregular light cavalry	4 Banderia

Casualties and losses
1,500 killed 1,500 imprisoned	Unknown

The Battle of Vrpile or Battle of Vrpile Gulch (Croatian: Bitka u klancu Vrpile), also known as the First Battle of Krbava Polje (Croatian: Prva krbavska bitka), was fought between the Kingdom of Croatia and the Ottoman Empire in early September 1491 at the Vrpile pass in central Croatia, near Korenica in Krbava. The Croatian army, led by Ban Ladislav of Egervár and Knez (Prince) Bernardin Frankopan, defeated the Ottomans who were on their way back from a raid into Carniola, to the Sanjak of Bosnia, carrying booty and Christian captives to be sold into slavery.

== Background ==
With the death of King Matthias Corvinus in 1490 the 7-year truce with Sultan Bayezid II ended and the Ottomans renewed their raids into Croatia and southwestern Hungary. Since the 14th century the Ottomans regularly plundered Croatian and other lands further west. Their light cavalry troops undertook plundering raids, capturing its inhabitants and taking them into slavery. One such raid started in 1491 when Mihaloğlu Hasan Bey from the Sanjak of Bosnia crossed the Una River and led an army consisting of around 10,000 light cavalrymen, known as the Akıncı, across Croatia into lower Carniola. They ravaged the countryside near Zagreb, Krško, and Novo Mesto, after which they spent almost a month in Carniola, plundering and taking captives. They intended to reach deep into the lands of the Holy Roman Empire, but on their return they were stopped by the floods of the Kupa and Krka rivers.

=== Battle of Kupa source ===
According to an anonymous Turkish chronicler, the akinjis were spotted by the locals who then alerted (what is probably) Benardin Frankopan. He then mobilized peasants from the surrounding villages and blocked all exits from the mountain where akinjis were hiding, while placing the main part of his army on a main road towards them. After realising that they were surrounded, the Ottomans decided "to strike at the infidels", but they were poured upon with a rain of arrows and gunfire, which caused them many casualties. The akinjis who managed to survive the Battle of Kupa source had to withdraw back to Bosnia across the territory of Croatia.

== Ambush at Vrpile ==
The Ottoman army was returning towards the Sanjak of Bosnia on their traditional route, Vrhovine – Homoljac – Korenica – Vrpile – Krbava field, taking with them a huge number of prisoners. Since the Ottomans had to go through the narrow Vrpile pass, the Croatian leadership decided to set an ambush there. The Croatian army was led by ban of Croatia Ladislav of Egervár, Count Bernardin Frankopan, and Mihovil Frankopan Slunjski. Ivan Frankopan Cetinski also participated in the battle. At the same time, Bernardin Frankopan who earlier fought a battle against them on Kupa source, organized a pursuit so the Ottomans reached Vrpile exhausted.

The Croatians let most of the Ottoman army enter the valley and then closed the passageway, deploying the main part of the army in 4 banderia. The Ottomans were heavily defeated and had around 1,500 killed and 1,500 imprisoned in the battle, while their captives were released, while only Hasan Bay with two or three of his men managed to escape. Later historical records mentioned that 18,000 Christian captives were saved.

== Aftermath ==
King Vladislaus II granted Ban Ladislav the town of Steničnjak in Kordun as a reward for the victory and the 120 Ottoman captives sent to the king. This defeat forced the Ottomans to halt their raids and attacks during the following year, 1492. The Ottomans started their campaigns again in 1493 with the election of Hadım Yakup Paşa as the sanjak-bey of the Sanjak of Bosnia. This defeat was the cause of the 1493 raid into Croatia, resulting in the Battle of Krbava Field on 9 September 1493.

== Sources ==
- Oreskovich, J.R. (2019). The History of Lika, Croatia: Land of War and Warriors. Lulu.com. ISBN 978-0-359-86419-5.
