= Školska knjiga =

Croatian book publisher in Zagreb

Školska knjiga d.d.
- Company type: Public
- Industry: Publishing
- Founded: Zagreb, Croatia (1950)
- Headquarters: Zagreb, Croatia
- Key people: Ante Žužul (COB)
- Products: Books; Magazines; Textbooks
- Revenue: HRK 260 million (2007)
- Number of employees: 290
- Website: skolskaknjiga.hr

Školska knjiga (lit. Schoolbook, pronounced [ʃkôlskaː kɲîɡa]) is one of the largest publishing companies in Croatia. It was established in 1950. Until the mid-1990s it had a virtual monopoly on publishing schoolbooks, and this remains its core business.
