= Relief of Cetingrad =

- Part of the Croatian–Ottoman wars and Ottoman–Habsburg wars
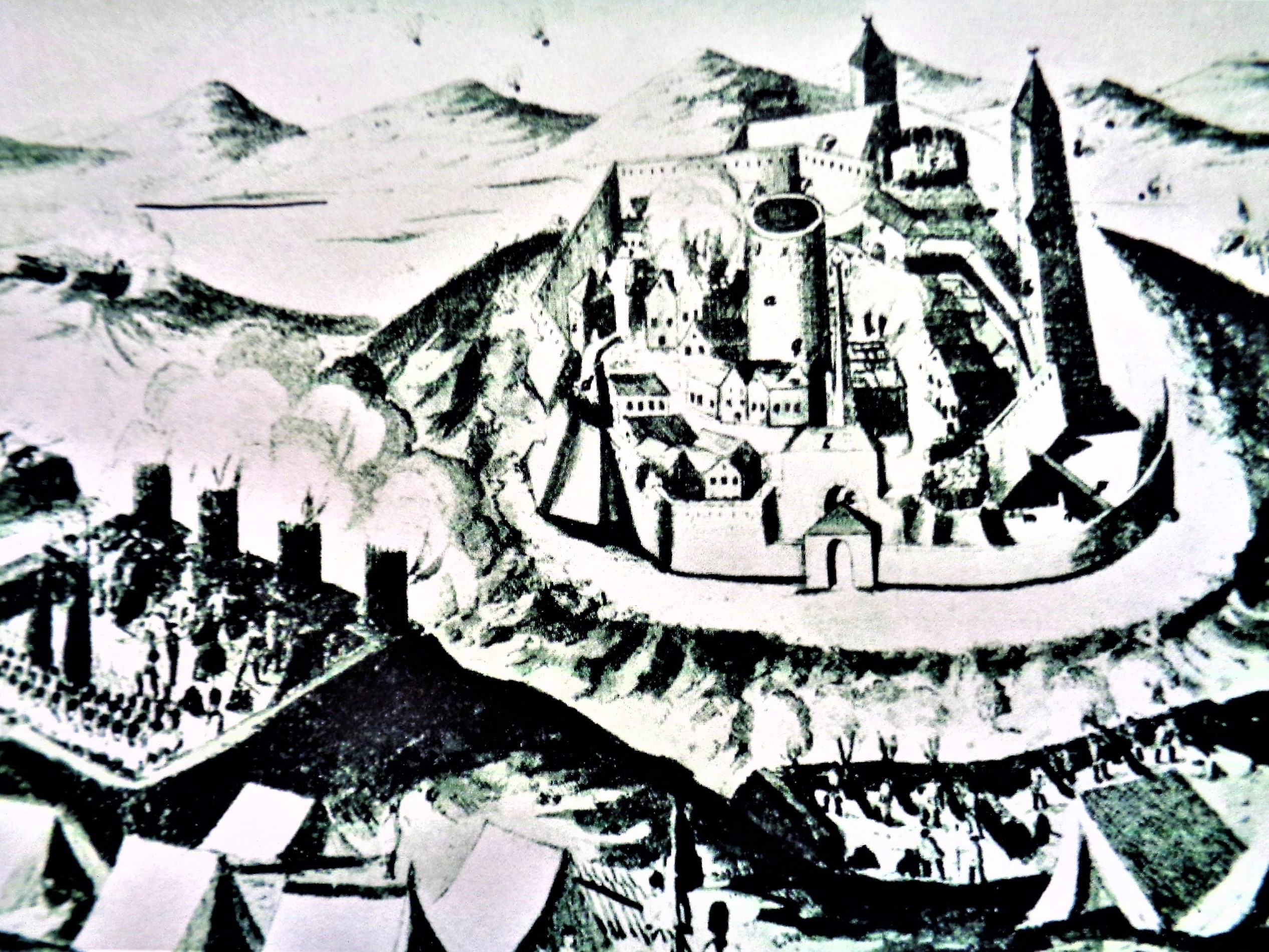
- contemporary image of the battlefield
| Date | 22 June – 20 July 1790 |
| Location | Cetingrad, Kingdom of Croatia in the Habsburg Monarchy (temporarily occupied by the Ottoman Empire) |
| Result | Habsburg victory |

Belligerents
| Habsburg Monarchy: Kingdom of Croatia | Ottoman Empire |

Commanders and leaders
| Joseph Nikolaus Freiherr de Vins, feldzeugmeister Christoph Andreas von Wallisch, lieutenant field marshal Daniel von Peharnik-Hotkovich, major general Antun Pejačević, colonel | Osman Gradaščević, Governor of Bosnia; Ali-Bey Beširević, Dizdar-Agha |

Strength
| ~4,000 | 1,000–2,000 |

Casualties and losses
| ~300 | ~1,000 |

The liberation of Cetingrad (Croatian: Oslobođenje Cetingrada) was a military conflict between the Croatian Corps of the Habsburg monarchy's army, led by Feldzeugmeister Joseph Nikolaus Baron de Vins, and the Ottoman army, led by Dizdar-Agha Ali-Bey Beširević (under higher command of Osman Gradaščević, Governor of Bosnia), dealing with possession of Cetin Castle and its surrounding area, in central Croatia (at the time occupied by the Ottoman Empire, forming the so-called Ottoman Croatia). The conflict was part of a military campaign within the Austro-Turkish War (1788–1791). Habsburg forces besieged the castle between 22 June and 20 July 1790, and, after almost a month, the operation ended victoriously for the Habsburg troops. Cetingrad, an important stronghold in the Croatian Military Frontier that had fallen into the hands of the Ottoman conquerors in the 16th century again became part of the Kingdom of Croatia.

== Historical background ==
On 1 January 1527 the Croatian Sabor gathered in Cetin Castle and elected Ferdinand I, Holy Roman Emperor of Habsburg as the Croatian king confirming this with the Charter of Cetingrad. Soon after that the Ottomans attacked the castle and its surroundings on several occasions using local Yamaks during the 16th century. It passed several times from one hand to another, and was demolished, burned and repaired again. It was then captured by Hasan Predojević and remained under Ottoman rule for a long time since 1584, then it was again a place of armed conflict several times, and again under Ottoman control since 1670. Some attempts to recapture it in the 18th century were unsuccessful. When the Austro-Turkish War broke out in 1788, a new opportunity arose again to try to relief the whole area of Cetingrad.

== Course of the military campaign in 1790 ==
In spring of 1790, the Imperial and Royal Croatian Corps of the Habsburg Army under the command of Feldzeugmeister Joseph Nikolaus Baron de Vins, moved from Karlovac to Vojnić. In this campaign, de Vins wanted to stop the Ottoman incursions into the border area and to liberate parts of Croatia proper in the region of Kordun, including the Cetin Castle, as well as Furjan, Velika Kladuša Castle, Bužim, Ostrožac, Tržac and some other Croatian places, that had earlier been conquered by the Ottoman Bosnian forces. In 1788, Major General Peharnik-Hotković units managed to recapture Drežnik Castle, which is situated a little further south. Now, the total strength of the Army Corps that arrived in the area was 24,380 men and 1,280 horses. However, they failed to capture the Velika Kladuša Castle which was still under Ottoman control.

In de Vins’ headquarters there were experienced officers such as lieutenant field marshal von Wallisch, major general Peharnik-Hotkovich, colonel Pejačević, lieutenant colonel Gyulay, lieutenant colonel von Liechtenstein, lieutenant colonel Jelačić Bužimski, major Vukasović and major Knežević.

Some units of the Corps advanced to Bužim, Ostrožac, Prijedor and Petrovac, while the 4000-men-strong troops, led by lieutenant field marshal von Wallisch, with Colonel Pejačević and Lieutenant-Colonel Gyulay, came on 22 June 1790 near Cetingrad, where the Ottoman unit of around 1000 men was stationed, and encircled them.

== Siege of Cetin Castle ==
The soldiers of the Croatian Corps immediately dug in and positioned their cannons. The next morning the cannons simultaneously opened fire on Cetin Castle. The besieged Ottoman garrison responded with gunfire through their own artillery cannons. In the following days the artillery fire continued and on 26 June, a large fire broke out in the castle, causing the ammunition depot to explode. After several days of heavy artillery fire, the walls of the castle were badly damaged and the corps soldiers tried to storm them to enter the castle, but without success. They also tried to dig several mines under the castle wall. The Dizdar of the castle found out about these plans and ordered his troops to destroy those mines.

The siege was largely slowed down because of the heavy rain that had fallen in early July. After the rain, the artillery attack intensified more and more and on 20 July the imperial and royal soldiers broke through an opening in the wall. They set the castle on fire, in order to destroy enemy and everything of value to the enemy. The castle was almost completely destroyed a little later. Shortly thereafter, some units of the remaining Ottoman soldiers surrendered. First lieutenant Biringer managed to capture the commander of the castle, Dizdar-Agha Ali-Bey Beširević. Although exposed to cannon fire, most of the survivors scattered and fled the battle field. Most of them fled back to the Velika Kladuša Castle still under Ottoman control.

== Aftermath ==
As the fire extended to the entire building structure, it took several days to extinguish it completely and partially clean up the castle. Between 25 and 28 July Habsburg soldiers succeeded in establishing the order. The captured Turkish weapons and war equipment (cannons, rifles, gunpowder, ammunition etc.) were counted, the dead were buried and prisoners were cared for. There were a total of at least 1000 dead and 144 captured Ottomans as well as around 300 men lost in the Habsburg Army.

The whole operation of the Croatian Corps on the territory of Kordun, Lika, Banovina and western Turkish Croatia lasted until mid-October 1790 when the activities gradually ceased. The Habsburg forces managed to retake part of Croatian territory, including Cetingrad, Furjan, Lapac, Boričevac and Srb in the Croatian military frontier area. A truce was then soon agreed between the opposing parties, and in the following year (on 4 August) the Treaty of Sistova was signed. However, the Ottomans did not accept the loss of Cetingrad and did not give up trying to recapture it. In the next years they undertook several raids on the Cetin Castle and the surrounding area, but without success. It definitely remained in Croatian possession, unlike some other castles and settlements (Bihać, Tržac, Ostrožac, Bužim etc.), which were never returned under Croatian control.

== See also ==
- Croatian–Ottoman Wars
- Ottoman–Habsburg Wars
- Ottoman wars in Europe
- Croatian Military Frontier
