= Franjo Frankopan Slunjski =

Croatian nobleman

- Knez (Prince); Ban (Viceroy) of Croatia
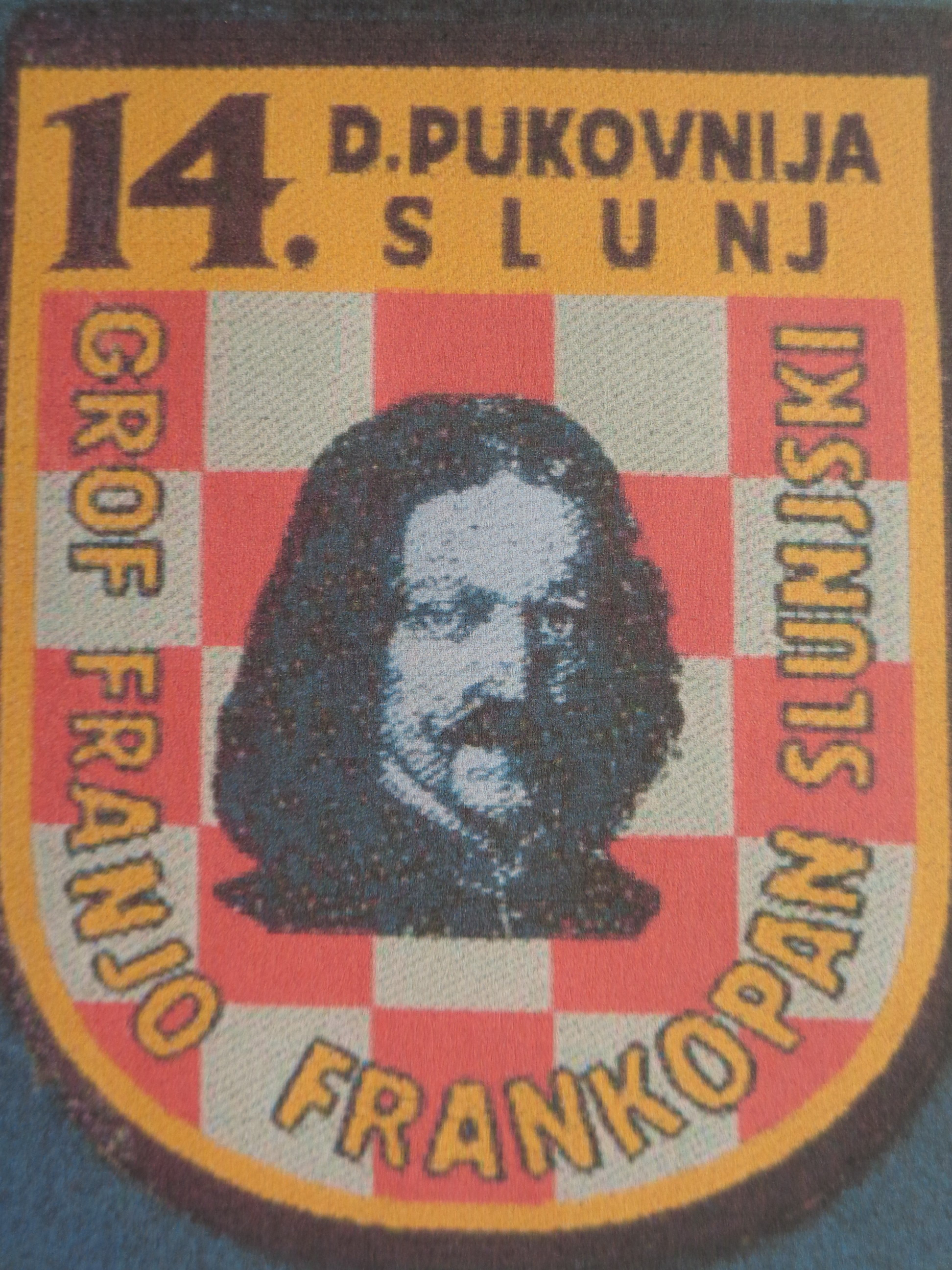
- Portrait
- Predecessor: Petar II Erdődy, Ban of Croatia
- Successor: Juraj II Drašković, Ban of Croatia
- Born: 1536; Slunj, Kingdom of Croatia
- Died: 2 December 1572 (aged 35–36); Varaždin, Kingdom of Croatia, Habsburg Monarchy
- Residence: Slunj
- Wars and battles: Hundred Years' Croatian–Ottoman War (Battle of Žirovnica (1560), Battle of Hrastovica (1571) etc.)
- Spouse: Judit Kerecsényi (fiancée)
- Parents: Juraj (George) III Frankopan Slunjski and Ana Frankopan née Babonić Blagajski

Franjo Frankopan Slunjski (English: Francis Frankopan of Slunj, Hungarian: Szluini Frangepán Ferenc; 1536 – 2 December 1572) was a Croatian nobleman from the branched Frankopan family in the 16th century. From 1567 until his death he served as Ban (Viceroy) of Croatia and was one of the most prominent figures of the fight against the Ottoman Turks and their expansion. Having been the last male descendant of the Slunj branch of the Frankopan family, he was called "the Sword and Shield of the Remnants of Illyria" (Latin: "ensis et scutum Illyrici reliquiarum", Croatian: "mač i štit ostataka Ilirije").

== Biography ==
=== Ancestry and family ===
Prince Franjo Frankopan Slunjski was born in Slunj in 1536 as the son of knez (prince) Juraj (George) III Frankopan Slunjski and his wife Ana Frankopan née Babonić Blagajski. His grandfather was Mihovil (English: Michael) I Frankopan Slunjski (fl. 1487–1514) and great-grandfather Dujam IV Frankopan (*? – †1487), who inherited Slunj estate at the partition of huge estates of Nikola IV Frankopan, once mighty Ban (Viceroy) of Croatia, that occurred on 12 June 1449 in Tržan Castle in Modruš. He had two sisters, Katarina (1520–1580) and Ana (1525–1577), who were married to Hungarian noblemen Imre Czobor de Czoborszentmihály and Miklós Oláh-Császár de Lánzsér, respectively. His father is known for organizing and hosting the assembly of the Croatian Parliament in the Cetin Castle by the end of 1526, where Ferdinand I of Habsburg, the Archduke of Austria, was elected King of Croatia. Several months before Ferdinand's election, Matija (English: Matthew) II Frankopan Slunjski, his father's brother, was killed in the Battle of Mohács in southern Hungary.

=== Early life ===
At the age of seventeen, he inherited his father Juraj, who died in 1553 and was buried most probably in the Church of the Holy Trinity in Slunj. He became the owner of castles of Slunj, Cetingrad, Mala and Velika Kladuša, Krstinja, Kremen, Ledenice and some others. Most of his possessions were in the immediate vicinity of the Sanjak of Bosnia and were under constant and serious Ottoman threat. He was forced to use all the income from his estates to strengthen his castles and their guards.

In 1553 he asked Ivan Lenković, the captain of Senj, to send soldiers as reinforcement to the castles of Hrastovica and Cetin, and in 1555 he demanded that his serfs should not be obliged to work on fortifications at the border, but without success. In 1557 and 1562 his men strengthened Drežnik Grad, Tržan grad in Modruš and some other castles. In 1555 he also asked for help from Ivan Ungnad, captain general, who in return demanded that Krstinja castle and both Kladuša castles would be handed over to the latter. Unfortunately, all defensive efforts were unsuccessful, as the Turks constantly attacked, looted and demolished Slunjski's estates, especially in the Pokuplje area.

=== Military career ===
He spent the whole of his short life defending Croatia and fighting against the Ottomans. Between 3 and 10 March 1560 the Croatian Parliament concluded that Slunjski should control the vulnerable Kupa River crossing at Letovanić, where he had to set up a guard. Soon after that, he took part in the army that clashed with the Ottomans near Žirovnica River and Slunj. In October he defended Mala Kladuša and its surroundings as well as Petrova Gora from the Ottoman attacks. In 1565 he participated in the failed defense of Krupa Castle, where he had unsuccessfully begged Count Herbert von Auersperg, the imperial commander-in-chief, to send the army to attack the invaders.

During the siege of Szigetvár in 1566, he was with his soldiers waiting at Győr as part of the main Habsburg imperial army, which did not help Nikola Šubić Zrinski to break the siege. In 1567 King Maximilian of Habsburg appointed him, together with Juraj II Drašković, the Bishop of Zagreb, as Ban of Croatia. Both Bans had a common official seal with the coats of arms of both families. They were instructed by the Parliament to supervise the works of the fortresses in Sisak and Hrastovica, and to ensure the safety of the serfs working there. In addition, the both bans could declare an uprising, so called insurrection, if necessary.

In 1568 and 1569, both bans succeeded in preventing the Ottomans from penetrating into Croatia near Hrastovica and Sisak. On 8 May 1569 the bans convened an assembly of the Croatian Parliament, at which the strengthening and defense of castles and the violence of the royal troops on the peasant estates were discussed. In the same year Slunjski undertook several raids across the temporary border with Bosnia in order to prevent Ottoman invasion.

=== Later life and death ===
During 1570 Slunjski attended several parliament sessions that were convened to discuss the defense of Hrastovica, which, despite the temporary truce, was continuously attacked by the Ottoman army. Subsequently, Croatian forces, led by him and accompanied by his relatives Nikola VIII Frankopan Tržački and Juraj IV Zrinski, crossed the Una River near Kostajnica in September and broke into the temporary Ottoman occupied territory. In June 1571 he managed to expel the Ottoman cavalry from Hrastovica again, thanks to his courage and military skill.

On 2 April 1572, he took part in the Hungarian parliament session in Pressburg at which Archduke Rudolf of Habsburg was proclaimed Croato-Hungarian king. He also attended the coronation ceremony on 25 September 1572. In the meantime, the Ottomans were constantly looting his estates, especially those close to the border, which he protected mainly at his own expense, with his serfs, some cavalry and guards. At that time he had only around 20 serfs left, so, since he fought almost permanently, the Croatian Parliament asked King Rudolf to give him some more estates which would enable him to get more revenues, but without result.

Franjo Frankopan Slunjski died in Varaždin on 2 December 1572, due to a minor but unprofessionally performed medical intervention. He was on the way to his wedding in Moravia with his fiancée Judit, the daughter of László Kerecsényi, retired captain of Szigetvár, one of the richest feudal lords in Hungary. His death occurred shortly after poisoning caused by excision of a purulent ulcer behind his ear.

The death of the ruling Viceroy of Croatia, called "the Sword and Shield of the Remnants of Illyria" (Latin: "ensis et scutum Illyrici reliquiarum"), caused a great repercussion throughout the country, as he was the last male descendant of his family branch. He was buried in the Cathedral of Zagreb, where his sister Ana placed a commemorative plaque in his honour. His estates were immediately taken over by the royal treasury, but the Frankopans of Tržac branch as well as the Zrinskis and Babonićs also claimed it as relatives of Slunjskis. His sister Ana finally handed over the rights to the estates to the King.

== Some castles of Franjo Frankopan Slunjski ==
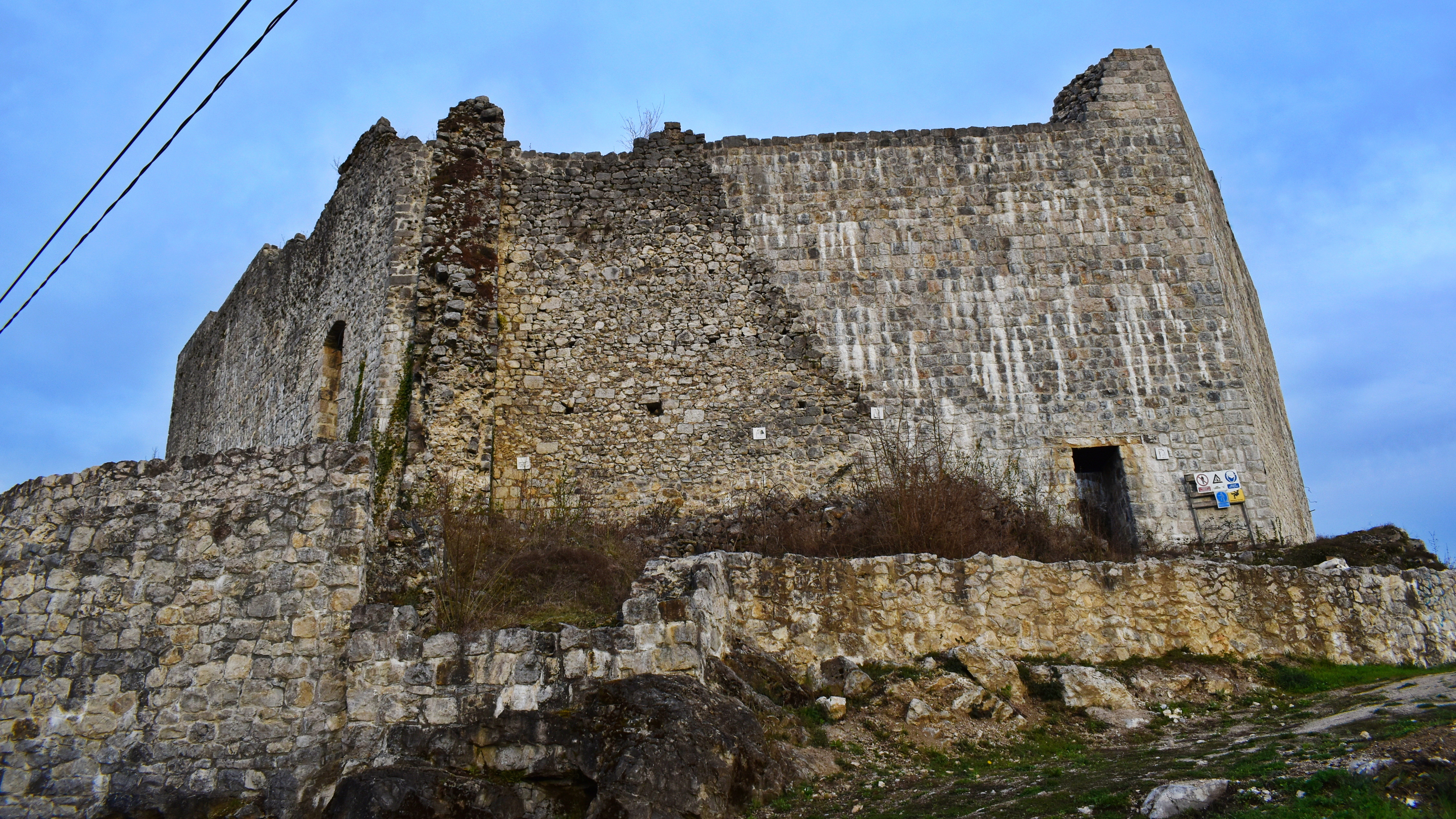
Ruins of Slunj Castle,
once the seat of the Slunjski branch of the Frankopan family

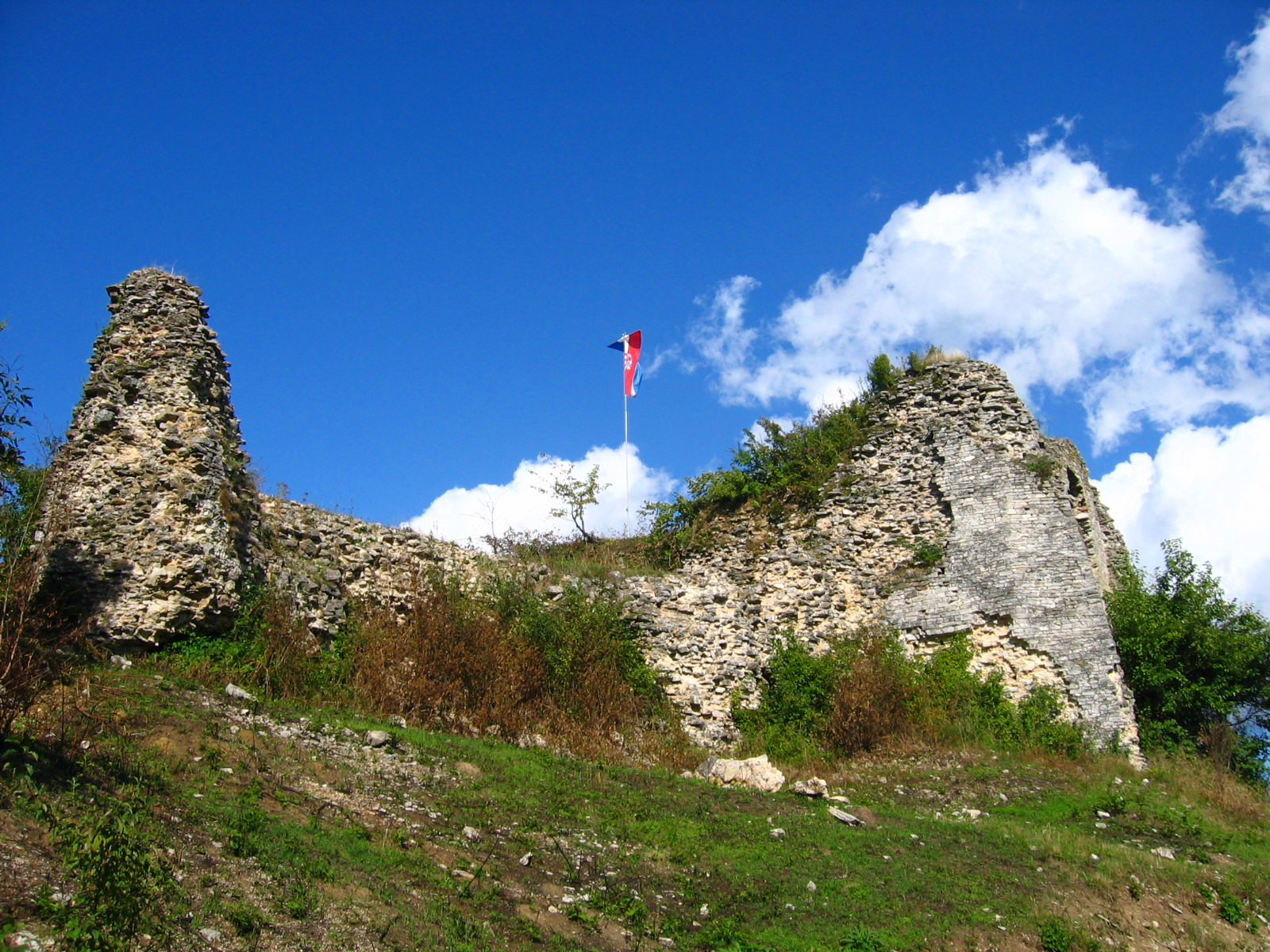
Cetin Castle

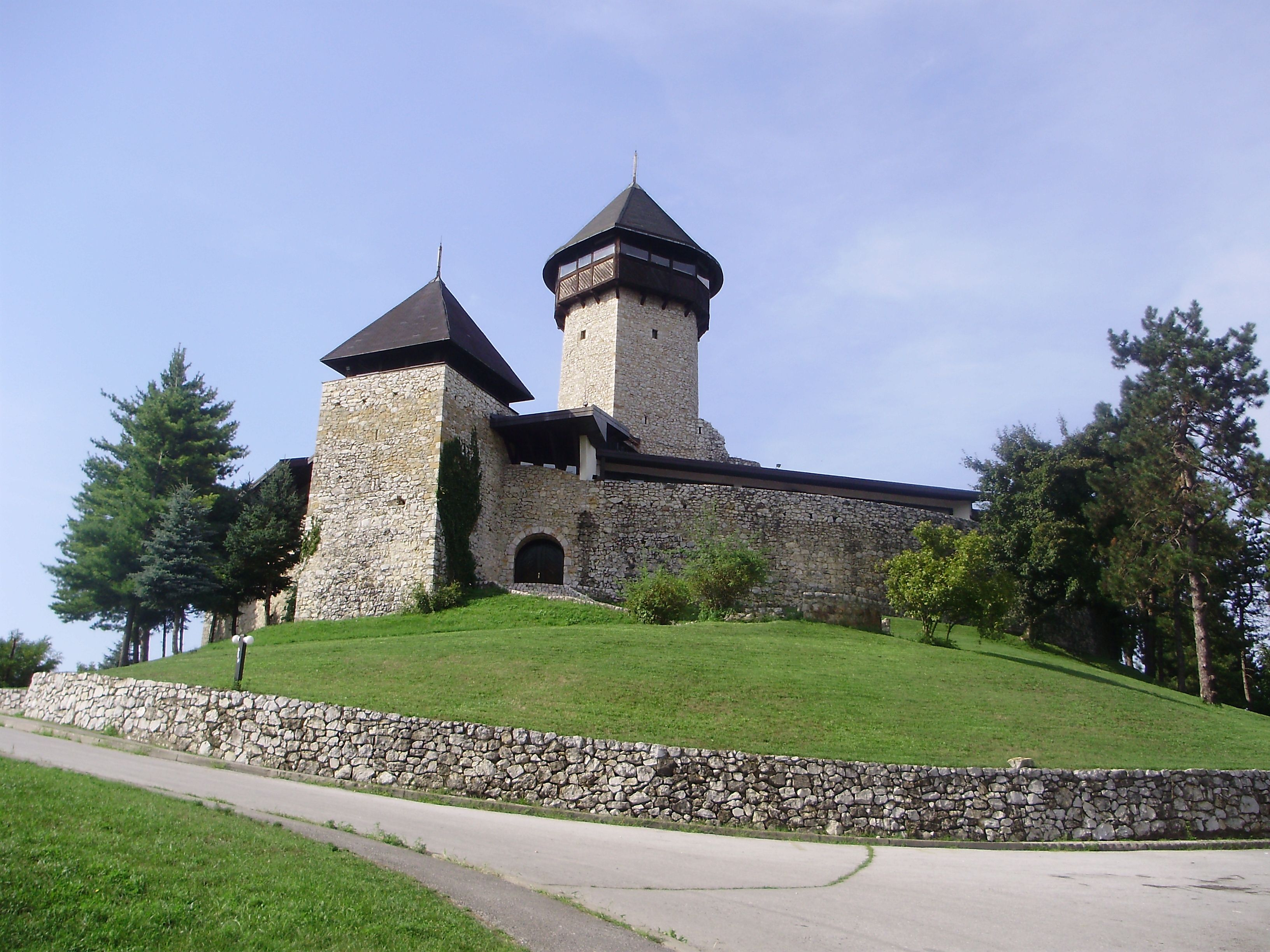
Velika Kladuša Castle

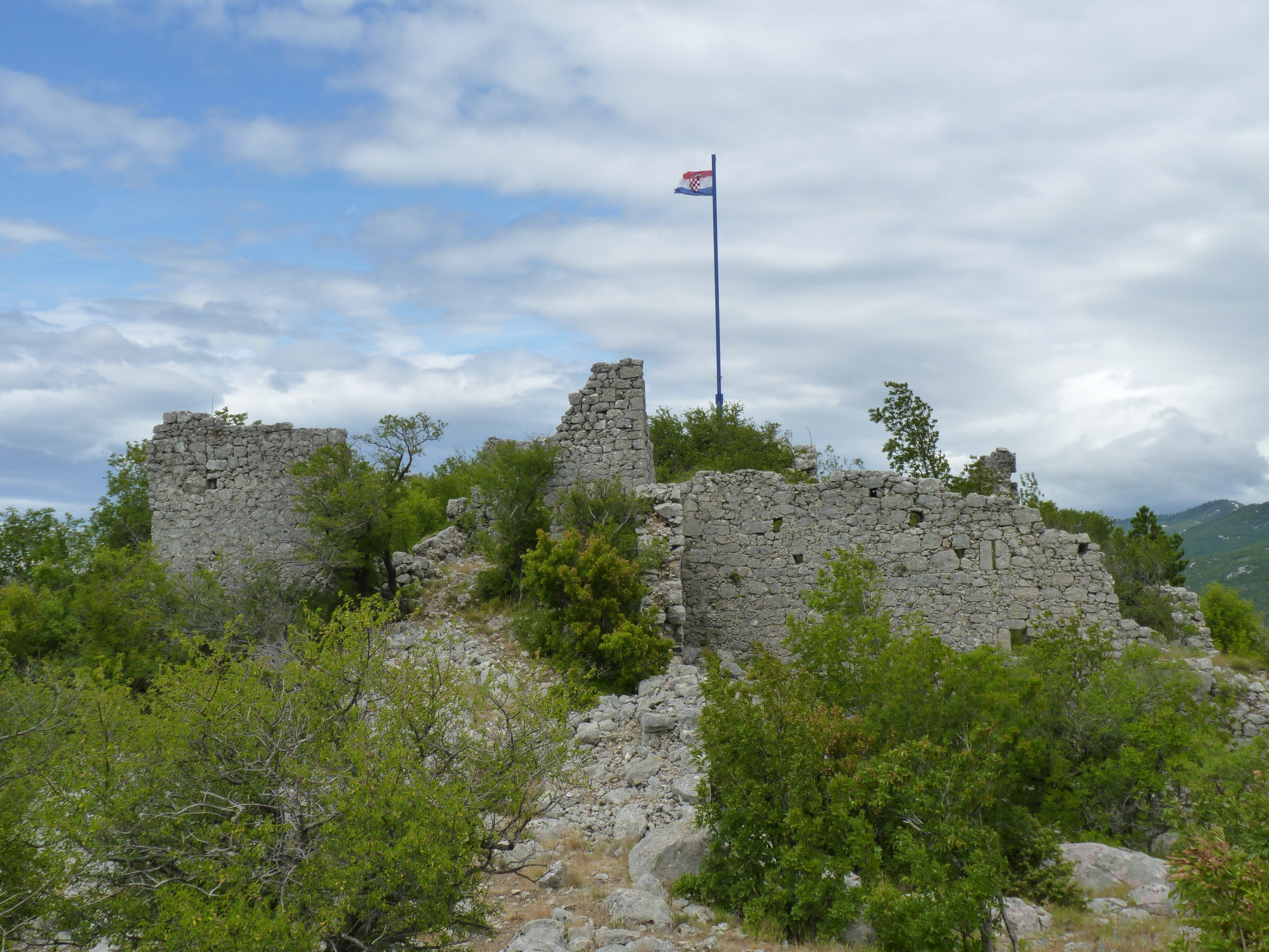
Ledenice Castle

== See also ==
- List of rulers of Croatia
- Kingdom of Croatia (Habsburg)
- Croatian nobility
- List of castles in Croatia

== Bibliography ==
- Kruhek, Milan (2014). "Slunjski kraj i njegova crkva u prošlosti i sadašanjosti" (PDF). Senjski zbornik (in Croatian). 41 (1): 83–96.

Franjo Frankopan Slunjski House of Frankopan Born: 1536 Died: 2 December 1572
Political offices
Preceded by Péter Erdődy	Ban of Croatia alongside Juraj Drašković; 1567–1572	Succeeded by Juraj Drašković
