= Battle of Konjščina =

- Part of Hundred Years' Croatian–Ottoman War and Ottoman–Habsburg wars
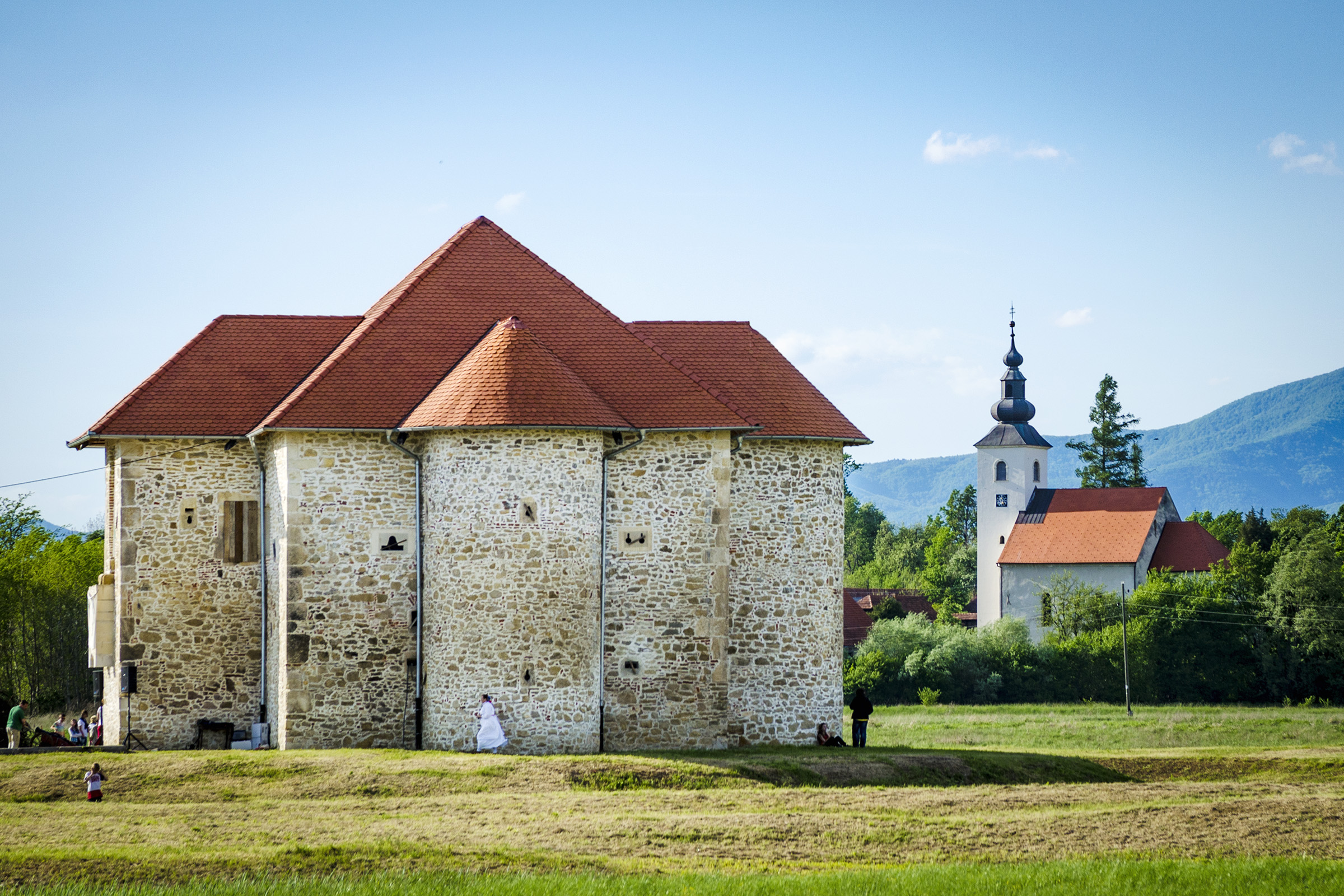
- Contemporary view of the restored fortress of the Counts Konjski, where the battle took place
Date	4 May 1545
Location	Konjščina, Kingdom of Croatia in the Habsburg Monarchy
Result	Ottoman victory

Belligerents
Habsburg monarchy: Kingdom of Croatia	Ottoman Empire

Commanders and leaders
Nikola Šubić Zrinski, ban of Croatia, Juraj Frankopan Slunjski, Stjepan IX Babonić Blagajski, Petar II Erdődy, Franjo Tahy, Juraj Wildenstein	(Ottoman Empire) Bosnian Sanjak-bey sandžak-beg Ulama-paša

Strength
Several thousands	7,000–10,000

Casualties and losses
Unknown	Unknown

The Battle of Konjščina was a military encounter fought in 1543 between the forces of the Kingdom of Croatia (within the Habsburg Monarchy) and the invading army of the Ottoman Empire. The battle took place on a plain in the Hrvatsko Zagorje region near the fortress at Konjščina, which was owned at the time by the Counts of Konjski. Croatian forces were led by Nikola Šubić Zrinski, the long-serving Ban (Viceroy) of Croatia, supported by Habsburg royal troops under the command of Juraj Wildenstein, the captain of Slavonia. On the Turkish side stood the Bosnian sanjak-bey Ulama Pasha, with approximately seven to ten thousand warriors. At the end of the battle, the Ottoman army emerged victorious, resulting in relatively low casualties.

== Historical background ==
Since the late 15th century, the Hrvatsko Zagorje region had been subject to occasional incursions of Ottoman akinji forces plundering across various parts of Croatia, Austria Slovenia and Hungary. The region served as a transit zone through which Muslim raiders from occupied Bosnia passed on their way to the intended targets for plunder. In the spring of 1545, a large Ottoman force numbering between 7,000 and 10,000 warriors, commanded by the Bosnian Sanjak-bey Ulama Pasha, arrived in the region. Having first established a camp near Varaždinske Toplice, smaller detachments of the force set out on raiding expeditions toward Zlatar, Konjščina and some other surrounding places.

In an attempt to prevent arson and looting, a Habsburg royal unit coming from Styria which was currently located in Croatia (numbering about 600 cavalrymen and commanded by Juraj Wildenstein, the Captain of Slavonia) tracked the Turks in the Konjščina area and awaited reinforcements. These reinforcements arrived with the Nikola Šubić Zrinski, Ban (Viceroy) of Croatia, and his forces. He led several hundred of his own cavalrymen who arrived in Konjščina on 3 May 1545 and was followed by some other Croatian magnates with their contingents, bringing their total numbers to a significant level. Among the prominent magnates were Juraj III Frankopan of Slunj, Stjepan IX Babonić of Blagaj, Petar II Erdődy, Juraj Keglević, Pavao II Ratkaj and Franjo Tahy. The Ban's army numbered approximately 900 cavalrymen and several thousand infantry in total.

== The Battle ==
Croatian troops led by Zrinski, and a detachment of Ottoman akinjis arrived almost simultaneously in the partially marshy plain near the fortress of Konjščina. The battle was to be started at the confluence of the Selnica River and the Krapina River. As the Turks were outnumbered, they attempted to establish contact with Zrinski to negotiate a truce, pending the arrival of their main force, which was stationed in a camp near Varaždinske Toplice. They succeeded in this negotiation and alongside truce, it was stipulated that a potential large battle would be resolved through duels fought with sabers and lances between the best warriors from both sides.

On 4 May 1545, during the duels between the elite warriors, the Ottoman main force, led by Ulama Pasha himself, arrived on the plain. Ulama unexpectedly broke the truce and launched a full-force attack against the royal and Ban's troops. Surprised by the intensity of the attack, the defenders fell into disorder. Some soldiers began to retreat towards the nearby forest. Suddenly, the Croatian battle lines were broken and many defenders abandoned their horses and equipment, fleeing the battlefield. Some of them escaped deep into the forest, others, who sought a secure refuge, ran toward the stone fortress of Konjščina.

Having failed in his attempts to halt his men's retreat, Nikola Šubić Zrinski rode toward the fortress. Before he reached the entrance bridge, his horse was shot, and he had to dismount and walk across the bridge to the safety of the fortified building. Juraj Wildenstein also found himself in danger and saved himself by jumping into the moat around the fortress, so he managed to escape.

== Aftermath ==
During the battle there were few casualties on both sides, but the Christian army lost a large number of its horses, which were captured by the Ottomans. Ulama Pasha decided not to attack the Konjščina Fortress and ordered his warriors to return home taking their rich booty with them. He was content with the victory in this battle; besides, had he decided to undertake a siege, he lacked the necessary siege equipment. Beyond the looted goods and livestock, the battle yielded no strategic gains for the Ottomans. Conversely, the defeat had a deeply negative impact within the Kingdom of Croatia. It demonstrated that the Ottomans were capable, with increasing frequency, of striking deep into territories far beyond the temporary Croatian-Ottoman border, such as the Croatian Zagorje. a region that had previously remained relatively peaceful and rarely targeted by akinji raids. The people of Zagorje lived in increasing fear of Turkish oppression, and this fear was also present in more distant Austrian regions, which were increasingly exposed to attacks by invaders from the east.

== Participants in the battle ==
Nikola Šubić Zrinski	Franjo Tahy	Ulama−paša

== See also ==
- List of battles 1301–1600
- Battle of Otočac (1543)
- Battle of Obreška
- Ottoman period in the history of Croatia
- List of castles in Croatia
