= Péter Erdődy =

Peter Erdődy Petar II. Erdödy

Ban of Croatia
- In office 27 December 1556 – 26 April 1567
- Preceded by: Nikola IV Zrinski
- Succeeded by: Franjo Frankopan Slunjski; Juraj Drašković

Personal details
- Died: 26 April 1567 Jastrebarsko, Kingdom of Croatia
- Resting place: Church of St. Nicholas, Jastrebarsko, Croatia
- Parent: Peter I Erdődy

Péter II Erdődy (Croatian: Petar II. Erdődy; c. 1504–1567) (Erdődy: a Hungarian noble family in the Kingdom of Hungary and Croatia since the Middle Ages) was the Ban of Croatia from 1557 to 1567 and the founding member of the Croatian branch of the Erdődy noble family.

== Biography ==
Péter was born around 1504. He was the son of Péter I Erdődy, the nephew of Tamás Bakócz. He succeeded the famous Nikola IV Zrinski as ban in 1557. He first gained notoriety with a series of military victories against the Ottoman Empire in 1552, including setting fire to Gradiška with Juraj III Frankopan.

He was given the titles of Reichsgraf in 1565 and Reichsfürst in 1566 by Maximilian II. Because he died soon (one year) after that, the titles weren't nostrificated. The title of Reichsgraf was nostrificated in 1580 for his two sons Thomas II and Peter III by Rudolf II. But the title of Reichsfürst got forgotten.

He died in 1567 in Jastrebarsko. His first son Tamás Erdődy later became ban as well.

== See also ==
- List of Bans of Croatia

== Sources ==
- "Die Geschichte des Hauses Erdődy" ("The History of the Erdődy family") after Dr. Karl Giay which is attached to Gräfin Helene Erdődy's book "Erinnerungen" ("Memories"). Released 1929 by Amalthea-Verlag, Vienna

Preceded by Nikola IV Zrinski	Ban of Croatia; 1557–1567	Succeeded by Franjo Frankopan Slunjski; Juraj Drašković
