= Bilina =

Bilina may refer to:

- Bílina, a town in the Czech Republic
- Bílina (river), a river in the Czech Republic
- Bilina, Croatia, a historic settlement in inland Dalmatia, Croatia
- Bilina, a pharmaceutical drug composition of Levocabastine and other components often used in eye-drops

== See also ==
- Bil'in, a Palestinian town
