= Joseph Nikolaus de Vins =

Austrian general

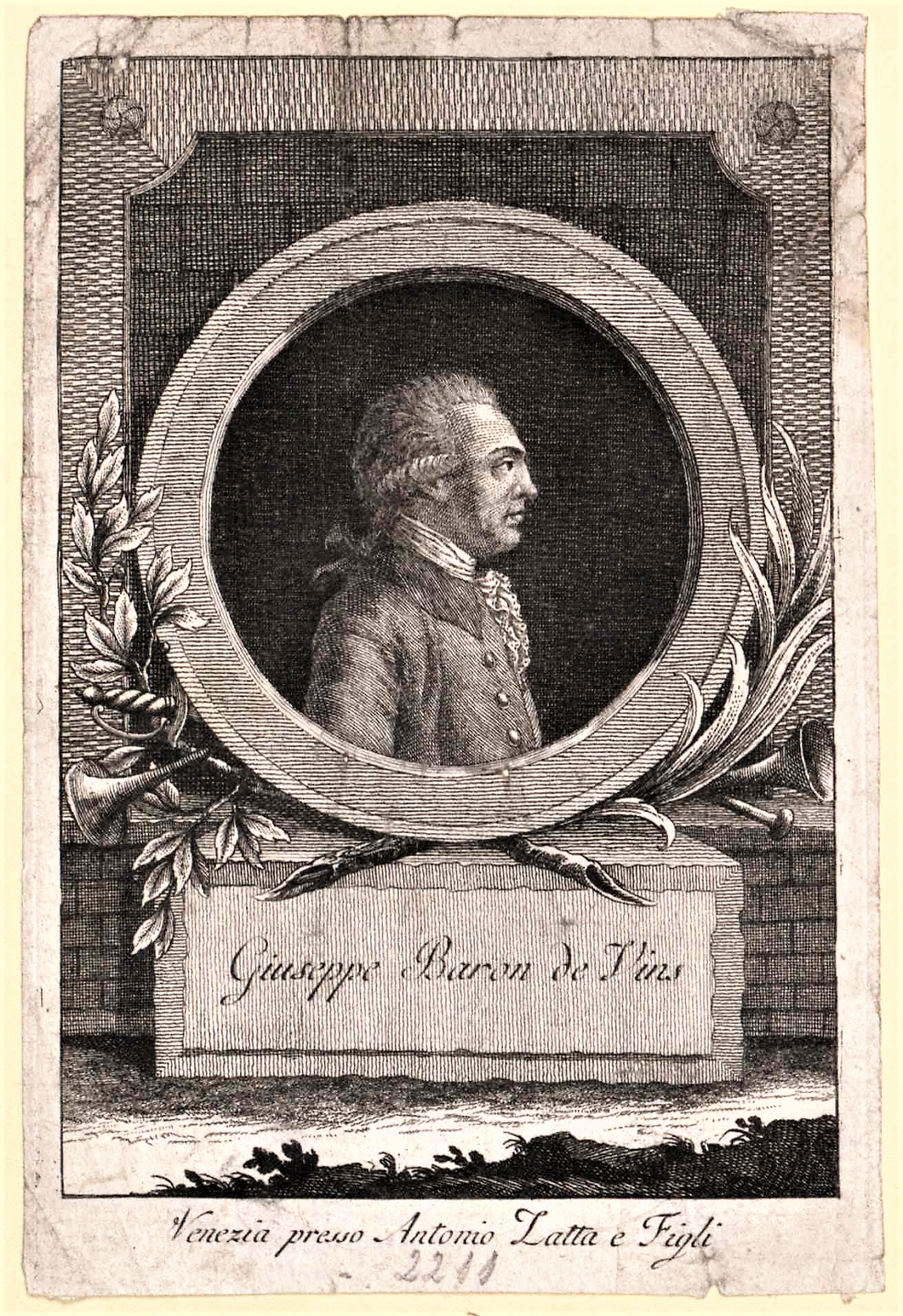
- Joseph Baron Nikolaus de Vins
- Born: 1732; Mantua, Lombardy, Habsburg Austria
- Died: 26 September 1798 (aged 65–66); Vienna, Habsburg Austria
- Military career
- Allegiance: Habsburg monarchy
- Branch: Infantry
- Rank: Feldzeugmeister
- Conflicts: Seven Years' War; Austro-Turkish War (1788–1791); French Revolutionary Wars
- Awards: Military Order of Maria Theresa, KC 1758, GC 1790
- Other work: Inhaber Infantry Regiment Nr. 37; Privy Councillor

Joseph Nikolaus Freiherr de Vins or Joseph de Wins (1732 – 26 September 1798), joined the army of Habsburg Austria and fought in the Seven Years' War where he was decorated for bravery. By 1773 he earned promotion to general officer. From 1783 he held important posts on the Military Frontier and led an independent corps in Croatia during the Austro-Turkish War. In the French Revolutionary Wars he commanded the joint forces of Austria and the Kingdom of Sardinia-Piedmont from 1792 until 1795. Though the French were held at bay during his tenure, his slowness and poor health prevented Piedmont's lost territories from being recovered. Throughout the period much tension existed between the two allies. Ironically, the day after De Vins resigned, the French attacked and badly defeated his replacement. He was Proprietor (Inhaber) of an Austrian infantry regiment from 1784 until his death.

== Early career ==
Joseph de Vins was born at Mantua in Italy in 1732. De Vins was the son of Hektor Franz de Vins, an Austrian Generalfeldwachtmeister killed at the Battle of Parma on 29 June 1734. Joseph de Vins went into the army of the Habsburg monarchy and fought in the Seven Years' War. Wartime promotion was rapid. On 8 September 1757 De Vins became Major, on 16 July 1760 he was named Oberstleutnant, and on 13 October 1761 he was elevated to Oberst (colonel). He won the Knight's Cross of the Military Order of Maria Theresa on 4 December 1758. His promotion to General-major came through on 1 May 1773. Another elevation in rank to Feldmarschall-Leutnant occurred on 3 April 1783. In that month he was appointed to command the Banal-Warasdin Military Frontier. He became Proprietor of the De Vins Infantry Regiment Nr. 37 on 7 February 1784 and held the office during his lifetime.

De Vins commanded the Banal-Warasdin-Karlstadt Military Frontier beginning in August 1786. On 10 November 1788 he received promotion to Feldzeugmeister. He led the Autonomous Corps in Croatia during the Austro-Turkish War (1787-1791). His tenure in corps command lasted from October 1787 to October 1790, though it was not continuous. He briefly led the Karlstadt-Warasdin Military Frontier from May 1790 to December 1791. The Croatian Corps of the Habsburg Army under his command with 24,380 men and 1,280 horses moved from Karlovac to the southeast in order to stop the Ottoman incursions into the border area and to liberate parts of Croatia in the regions of Kordun and Lika. This Corps won the battle of Cetingrad and succeeded in retaking some border areas of Croatian territory from the Ottoman Empire, including Cetingrad, Furjan, Lapac, Boričevac and Srb, again to become parts of the Kingdom of Croatia within the Habsburg Monarchy.

De Vins received the Grand Cross of the Military Order of Maria Theresa on 19 December 1790. After the war he served as Inspector General of the Military Frontier from 1791 until his death.

== French Revolution ==
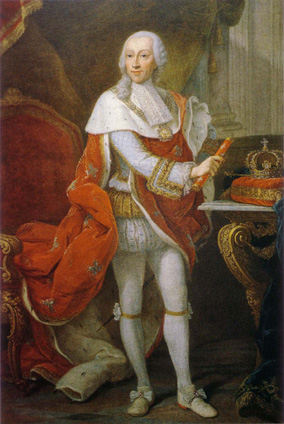
King Victor Amadeus asked for the Austrians to provide him with a general

In the spring of 1792, the French First Republic declared war on the Kingdom of Sardinia-Piedmont. In the fall, the French invaded the County of Nice on the Mediterranean coast and Duchy of Savoy in the northwest. The French seized Chambéry in Savoy on 24 September and Nice on 29 September. In the south, the Piedmontese army withdrew to a powerful defensive position at Saorge (Saorgio), blocking access to the strategically important Col de Tende (Tenda Pass). The onset of winter weather spared Piedmont the loss of more territories.

Shocked at the incompetence of his high-ranking officers, King Victor Amadeus III of Sardinia begged the Austrians to send a general to supervise the combined Austrian and Piedmontese armies. Accordingly, De Vins was appointed to fill the position on 21 December 1792. The French attacked Saorgio in June 1793 and were defeated. The Allies tried to mount a counteroffensive, but this effort was crippled by the new commander's slowness. De Vins planned to recapture both Savoy and Nice. Because he suffered badly from gout, De Vins intended to supervise both operations from the capital of Turin. Prince Maurizio, Duke of Montferrat, named to lead the invasion of Savoy, was directed to follow strict daily instructions from De Vins. Since Turin was 45 miles (72 km) away, the arrangement was impractical. In any case, the Savoy column was turned back with heavy losses at the Battle of Epierre on 15 September 1793.

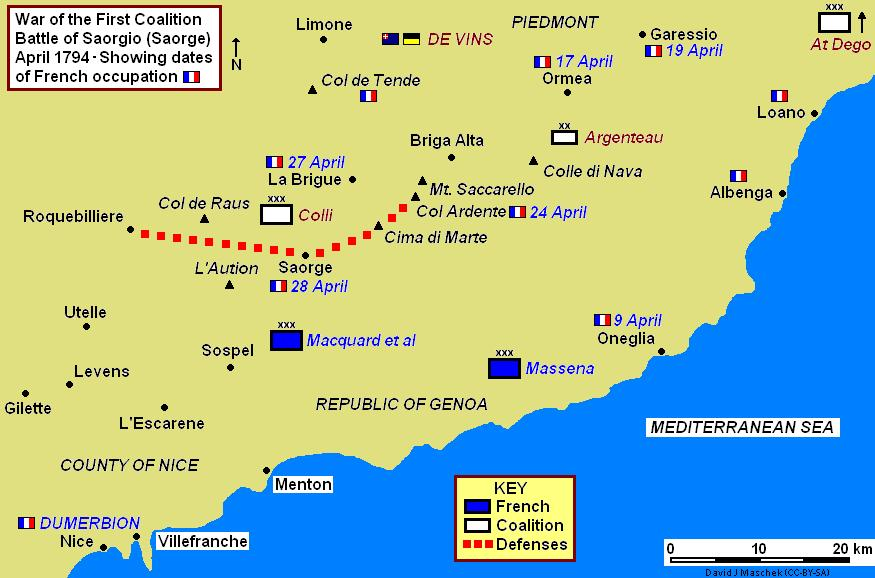
This map shows the Battle of Saorgio campaign in April 1794. The progress of the French offensive is displayed with flags and dates where known. The locations of the events of 1792 and 1793 are also shown.

Charles-François Thaon, Count of Saint-André was directed to advance on Nice from Saorgio. This effort was complicated by the dislike that Saint-André and his Austrian subordinate Michelangelo Alessandro Colli-Marchi had for one another. Furthermore, the Piedmontese officer corps hated De Vins' chief of staff, Eugène-Guillaume Argenteau. At this time, areas of southern France rebelled against the revolutionary government. Large forces were diverted to contain the revolt at the Siege of Toulon, giving the allies a chance to recover territory. De Vins and King Victor Amadeus left in August for the southern front, where operations were supposed to start on 7 September 1793. On 18 October, six Piedmontese battalions defeated the French at Gilette. Three days later, there was an inconclusive skirmish at Utelle. In the end, the offensive petered out when snow began to fall in the mountains, prompting the disappointed king to return to his capital in mid-November.

The following year, Sardinian General Dellera wanted to occupy Briga Alta northeast of Saorgio, but De Vins overruled him. However, Dellera convinced the army commander to position an Austrian force at Dego to the east. On 6 April 1794, French General Pierre Jadart Dumerbion launched an offensive which seized the port of Oneglia on the 9th. Argenteau attempted to organize a defense at Ormea but the French captured that town on 18 April and Garessio the next day. With Saorgio outflanked on the east, De Vins advised Colli to hold the position but to send back other forces not needed for immediate defense. Meanwhile, the Austrian force at Dego failed to send any help. Relations between the Allies were so poor at this time that some Piedmontese officers believed that De Vins had betrayed their nation. The Battle of Saorgio took place on 24 April and also included clashes at the Col Ardente on the 24th and Briga on the 27th. The French seized Saorgio on 28 April after Colli withdrew. By early May he abandoned the Col de Tende and fell back nearly to the fortress of Cuneo. On the coast, the French advanced to seize Albenga and Loano.

From August 1794 until March 1795, De Vins went on leave from the army. In his absence, Olivier, Count of Wallis suffered a defeat at the First Battle of Dego on 21 September 1794. The French failed to exploit the success and instead withdrew to Vado Ligure. After De Vins returned, he launched an attack along the Italian Riviera on 29 June 1795. French general François Christophe de Kellermann was defeated and driven back west, losing Vado. Kellermann was replaced by Barthélemy Louis Joseph Schérer and the new general counterattacked in the fall, recapturing some lost territory. However, a winter gale struck on 18 November, apparently halting operations. De Vins, suffering from scurvy according to Colli's chief of staff, named Wallis as his replacement and left the army on 22 November 1795. Schérer mounted a major assault the next day in the Battle of Loano. For casualties of 3,000, the French inflicted 2,500 killed and wounded on the Allies, while capturing 4,000 soldiers, 48 guns, and five colors. Fortunately for the allies, Schérer declined to follow up his victory.

De Vins died on 26 September 1798 at Vienna.

== Notes ==
Military offices
Preceded by Josef Siskovics	Proprietor (Inhaber) of Infantry Regiment Nr. 37; 1784–1798	Succeeded by Franz Xaver von Auffenberg
