= Dizdarević =

Dizdarević is a South-Slavic occupational surname, derived from Ottoman Turkish and ultimately taken from the Persian derived word dizdar meaning "castellan" (the commander of a castle). Notable people with the surname include:

- Belmin Dizdarević (born 2001), Bosnian footballer
- Emir Dizdarević (born 1958), Bosnian chess grandmaster
- Nađa Dizdarević, Bosnian activist
- Nenad Dizdarević (born 1955), film director, screenwriter, producer
- Raif Dizdarević (1926–2026), Yugoslavian politician
- Slaven Dizdarević (born 1981), Slovak decathlete born in Bosnia and Herzegovina
- Srđan Dizdarević (1952–2016), Bosnian journalist, diplomat and activist
- Zija Dizdarević (1916–1942), Bosnian prose writer
