= Juraj III Frankopan =

Croatian nobleman

- Knez (Prince)
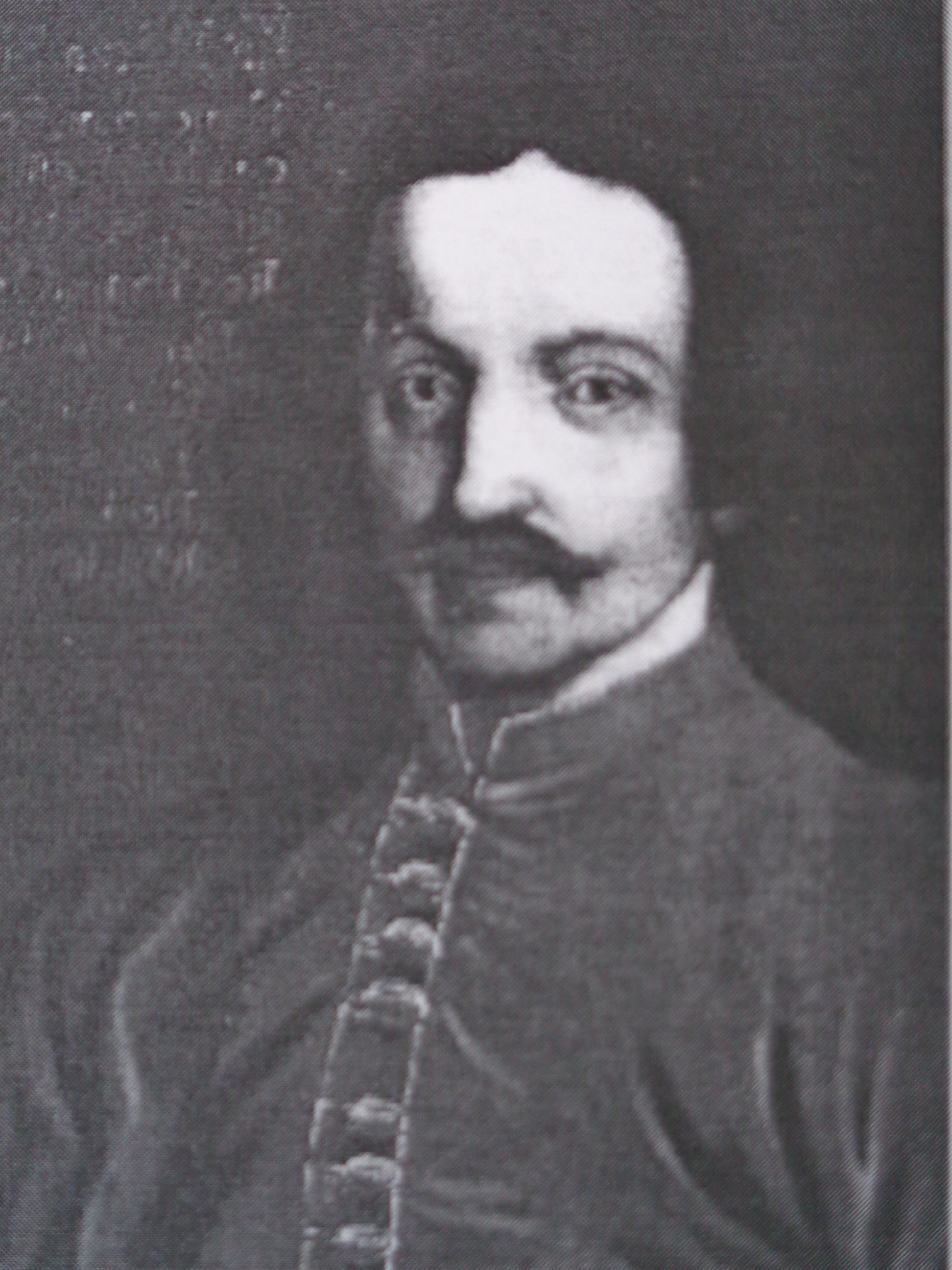
- Portrait
- Predecessor: Mihovil I Frankopan
- Successor: Franjo Frankopan Slunjski, Ban of Croatia
- Known for: signatory of the Cetingrad Charter, confirming the election of Ferdinand of Habsburg as King of Croatia
- Born: (?); Slunj(?), Kingdom of Croatia
- Died: 1553; Slunj, Kingdom of Croatia, Habsburg Monarchy
- Residence: Slunj
- Spouse: Ana Babonić of Blagaj
- Issue: Franjo, Ana, Katarina
- Parents: Mihovil (father)

Juraj III Frankopan (English: George III Frankopan; ?–1553) was a Croatian nobleman, a member of the Slunj branch of the Frankopan noble family, very powerful and influential in the Croatian Kingdom. He was proprietor of many estates and castles, among which Slunj Castle and Cetin Castle. He is best known for organizing and hosting the assembly of the Croatian Parliament in the Cetin Castle by the end of 1526, that followed a succession crisis in Croatia and Hungary caused by the death of King Louis II, which resulted in the election of Ferdinand I of Habsburg, the Archduke of Austria, as King of Croatia.

== Biography ==
The birth date of the new-born knez (prince) in the Frankopan family has not been determined with certainty, but it is assumed to be in the middle of the second half of the 15th century. Born as the son of Mihovil /Michael/ I Frankopan and the grandson of Dujam /Doimus/ IV Frankopan, who inherited Slunj area after the partition of huge estates of the latter's father Nikola IV Frankopan, once mighty Ban of Croatia, that occurred in 1449, Juraj III later succeeded in acquiring some other properties, mostly from the members of the Cetin branch of the Frankopans, who became extinct. He had two brothers, Matija (who was killed by the Ottomans in the battle of Mohács in 1526) and Petar. He was married to kneginja (princess) Ana Babonić of Blagaj.

After the battle of Mohács and the death of King Louis II in 1526, the throne was empty, so Croatian nobility decided to elect a new Croatian king, possibly a mighty and rich personality who could help against the massive Ottoman expansion. Juraj III Frankopan was among those most influential magnates in the country who organized assembly of the Croatian Parliament in his Cetin Castle. Like many of nobility, he already earlier supported Ferdinand I of Habsburg to be the new Croatian king. On the contrary, some members of the Frankopan family, especially those of the Modruš–Ozalj branch, were supporters of count Ivan /John/ Zápolya, like some other Croatian noblemen, mostly from Slavonia.

The 1527 election in Cetin confirmed Ferdinand I of Habsburg as King of Croatia, with a charter verified by six Croatian aristocrats and dignitaries, including Juraj III. His seal is located on the right side of the charter, close to the chequered state seal of Croatia. Following the election, the country joined the Habsburg monarchy.

Juraj III Frankopan, together with other Croatian magnates, participated in many battles against the invading Turks, among others in the Battle of Otočac and the Battle of Konjščina.

He had three children – Franjo, Ana and Katarina. The daughters were married to Hungarian noblemen and the son ruled as the Ban (Viceroy) of Croatia. Juraj died in 1553 and was buried most probably in the Church of the Holy Trinity in Slunj. There is a commemorative plaque in the church, partially damaged, with the inscription „…jacet in tumba magnificus…“ and the Frankopan coat of arms, which is believed to refer to him. In the church courtyard, a statue of him was erected in 2016, made by sculptor Josip Turkalj.

== See also ==
- Cetingrad Charter
- Croatian nobility
- House of Frankopan
- List of castles in Croatia
