= Antun Pejačević =

Croatian Austrian nobleman and politician (1749–1802)

Antun Pejačević von Virovitica (German: Anton Pejatschewitsch von Virovitica; Bulgarian:Антун Пеячевич; Serbian: Антун Пејачевић; 4 September 1749 – 25 September 1802) was a Croatian Austrian nobleman, politician, and military commander from the House of Pejačević. He was a lieutenant field marshal in the Habsburg army, a grand captain of Požega, and a patron and an entrepreneur. His name and the name of his wife are frequently mentioned in connection with the glass manufacturing industry and trade in the region.

== Life ==
Antun III Count Pejačević von Virovitica (full name Antun Mihajlo Ignjat Nepomuk Viktorin Pejačević) was born in Osijek, Habsburg monarchy, as the youngest son of Josip II Pejačević (1710–1787), then still a baron, and his wife Elizabeta née Peterson. He had two brothers, Žigmund Pejačević (1741–1806) and Karlo III Ferdinand Pejačević (1745–1815), as well as a sister, Josipa Elizabeta. His grandfather Marko II Pejačević (1664–1727) was born in Tschiprowzi in Bulgaria before he settled in Eastern Slavonia. He was of the Eastern Orthodox faith before converting to Roman Catholicism when he joined the Imperial-Royal Army.

In 1774 Antun married Countess Barbara Drašković von Trakošćan in Varaždin. They had four children: Antun (IV.), Stjepan, Barbara, and Ana.

Pejačević graduated from the Theresian Military Academy in Wiener Neustadt and then served as a lieutenant in the regiment of Graf Pálffy and later in the Slavonian border Infantry Regiment No. 8 (Gradiskaner).

He took part in several wars and numerous battles: War of the Bavarian Succession (1778–1779), Russian-Austrian Turkish War (1787–1792), French Revolutionary Wars (1792–1797), Napoleonic Wars (1798–1815), and the Battle of Dubica (1788 ), Battle of Cetingrad (1790), etc.

He has received several awards for his services, including the Knight's Cross of the Military Order of Maria Theresa, which he received on 19 December 1790 in his 23rd doctorate. He advanced relatively quickly: in 1773 he became a major, in 1786 a colonel (in the first regiment of the Banat military frontier ), in 1793 major general, and 1801 a field marshal lieutenant. He was also a Mason.

Count Antun Pejačević von Virovitica died shortly afterward, on 25 September 1802, in his castle in Virovitica.

== See also ==
- Pejačević family
- List of Croatian noble families
- Pejačević Castle
