= Velika Kladuša Castle =

Castle in Velika Kladuša, Bosnia

- Velika Kladuša, Bosnia and Herzegovina
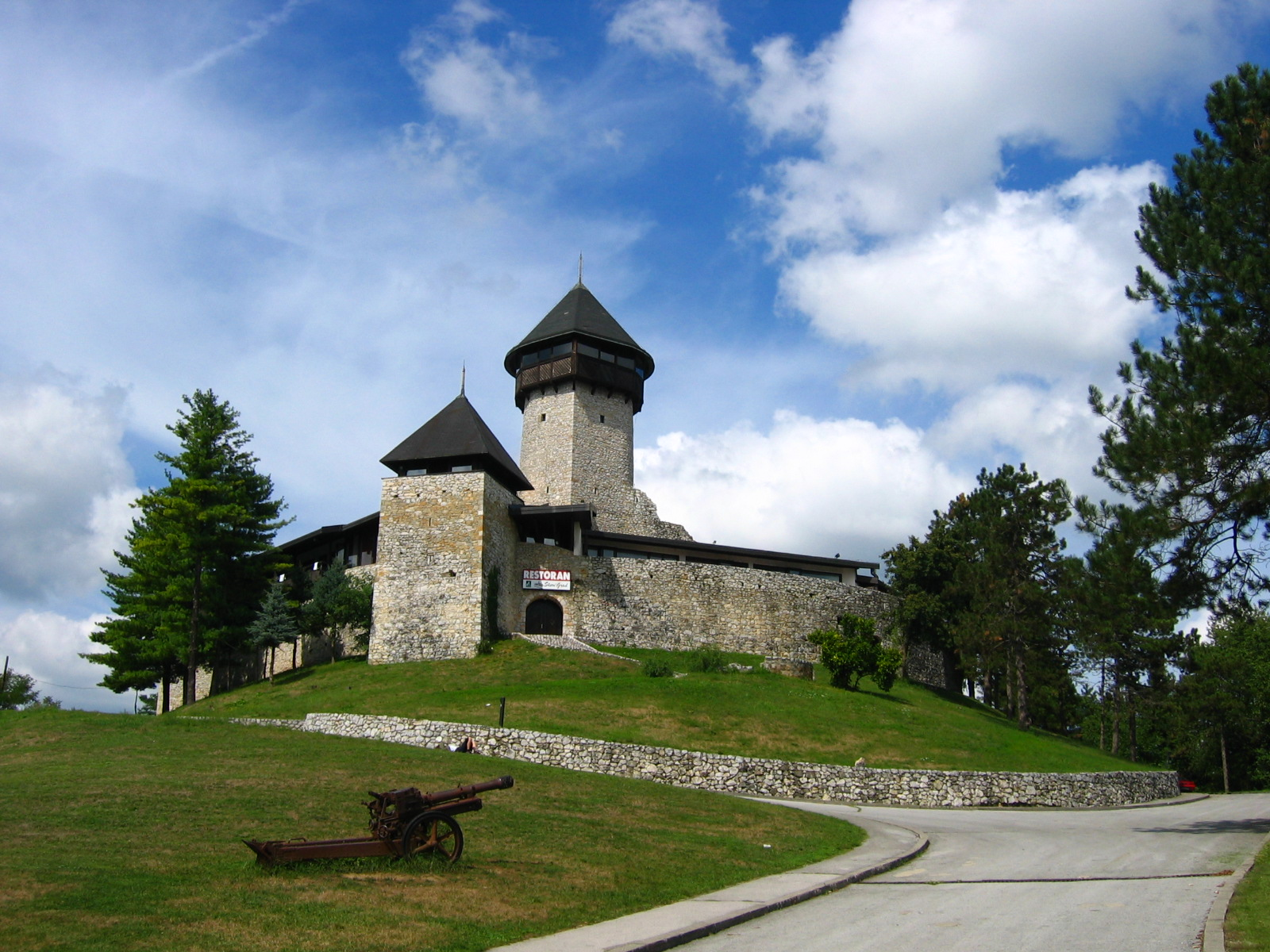

Location
- Location within Bosnia and Herzegovina
- Coordinates: 45.18195°N 15.80019°E

Velika Kladuša Castle is a castle in Velika Kladuša, Bosnia and Herzegovina. It was built during the Middle Ages. Its main tower has burned down due to an electrical fire.

== Location ==
The castle is situated on the right side of the river Grabarska, which is a tributary of the river Kladušnica.

== History ==
The Velika Kladuša Castle is first mentioned in historical sources in 1280 under King Ladislaus IV of Hungary. The castle was the property of the Babonići/Blagajski, and later it was the property of the Dukes of Kladuša. It fell into the hands of Frankopans of Cetin in 1465. The Ottoman Empire conquered this territory and castle in 1633. Afterwards, they additionally emboldened it with the construction of a wall. After the Ottoman conquest of the castle in 1633, the Ottomans appointed a Dizdar to defend the castle. They also installed a number of Janissaries to defend the castle.

The castle boasted great strategic importance for the Ottoman conquests towards Croatia.

In the early 18th century, the Ottoman government at Istanbul decided to oust the local dizdar of the castle and appoint direct rule of the castle. They sent out a declaration form or royal firman (mandate or decree) to the dizdar of the castle. After the Dizdar refused, they sent out a force of Janissary troops from Istanbul to capture the castle which they did and they garrisoned the Janissaries in the castle.

The castle saw notable repairs in 1800.

Until 1790. the garrison consisted of 120 men. After Cetina fell, additional 72 soldiers joined the garrison.

The last Dizdar (castle captain) of Velika Kladuša was Husein Alagić, whose family served in the same position for the prior 150 years.

According to reports of Krsto Frankopan of Tržac, dating back to 20. November 1641, Harambasha Mujo Hrnjica lived here along with his brothers and Mustafa Kozličić.

In 1833, There were 4 battle ready and 1 broken down cannon in the castle. The troops of the general of Karlovac defeated the army of the captain Murad Beširević.

The battle raged in the city of Velika Kladuša for ten days between one battalion of the attacking Austro-Hungarian army. In the night between 19-20 October 1878, the last eight defenders left the stronghold because of the lack of ammunition. The Bosnian armed resistance against occupation ended here.

The castle was refurbished and repurposed into a tourist establishment.
