= Juraj Drašković =

Croatian Roman Catholic statesman and cardinal

His Eminence Juraj Drašković
- Cardinal, Bishop of Zagreb, Pécs and Győr, Archbishop of Kalocsa, Ban (viceroy) of Croatia
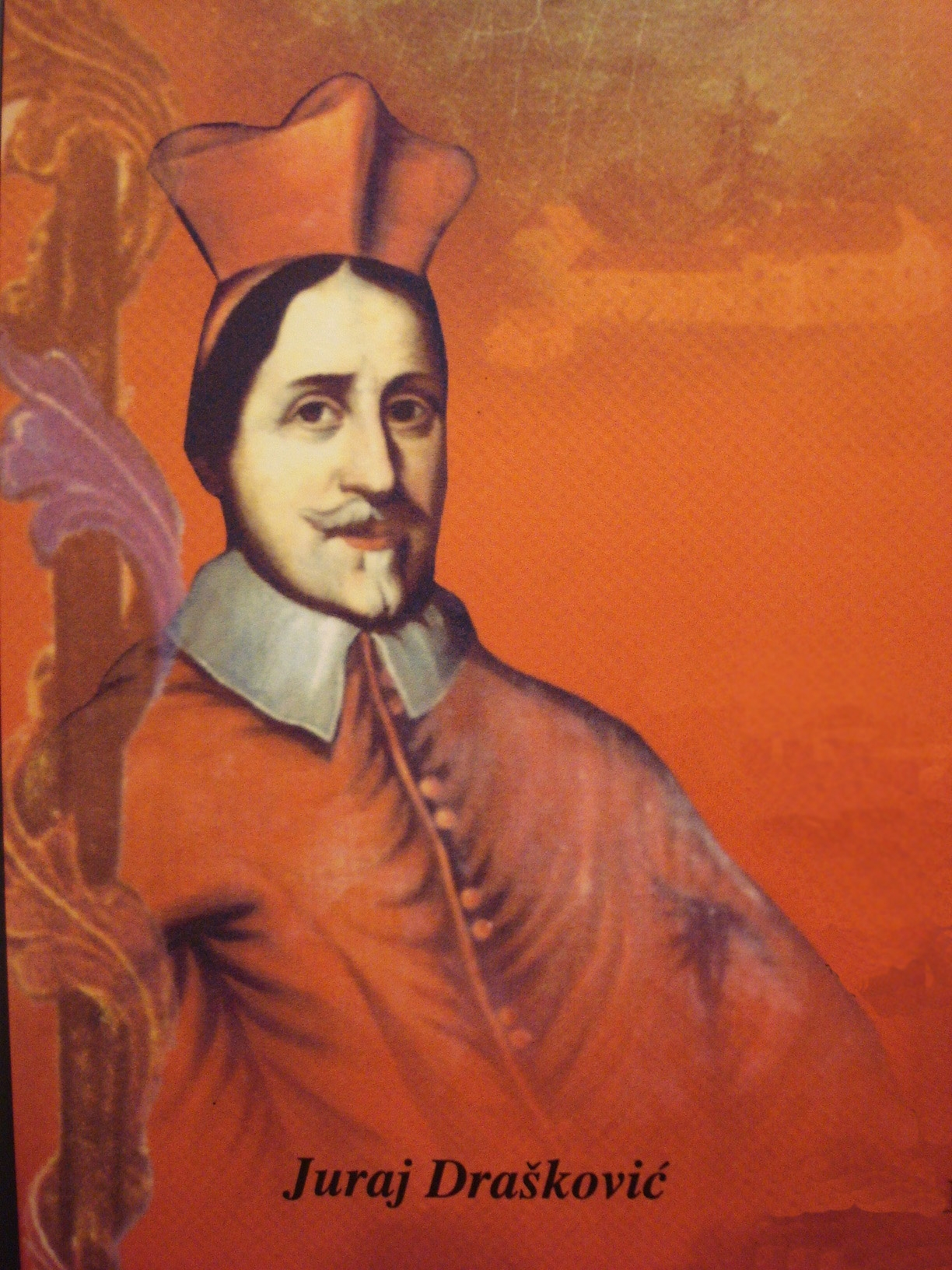
- Diocese: Kalocsa
- Predecessor: Matija Bruman
- Successor: Ivan Kranjčić Moslavački

Orders
- Ordination: 1553
- Consecration: 22 April 1557
- Created cardinal: 18 December 1585
- Rank: Cardinal priest

Personal details
- Born: 5 February 1525 Bilina, Croatia
- Died: 31 January 1587 (aged 61) Vienna, Habsburg monarchy
- Buried: Cathedral of Blessed Virgin; Mary in Győr, Hungary
- Denomination: Roman Catholic
- Residence: Zagreb
- Parents: Bartol and Ana née Utješinović
- Occupation: Catholic priest
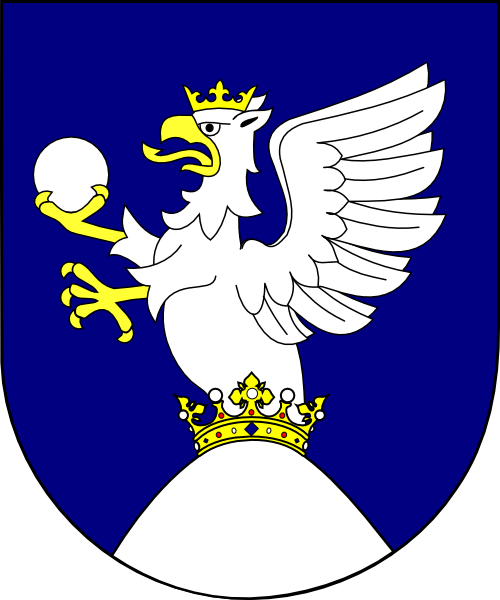
- Coat of arms: Juraj Drašković's coat of arms

Juraj II Drašković (English: George II Drashkovich, Croatian: Juraj II. Drašković, Hungarian: Draskovics II. György; 5 February 1525 – 31 January 1587) was a Croatian nobleman, statesman and Catholic bishop and cardinal. He held significant positions within the Croatian Kingdom. He was a member of the House of Drašković and elected by the Sabor – the Parliament of Croatia – as Ban (viceroy) of Croatia to oversee the country between 1567 and 1578.

== Early life ==
Juraj Drašković was born at Bilina near Knin (southern Croatia), the eldest son of Bartol /Bartholomew/ Drašković (*c.1500; †1538) and his wife Ana née Utješinović, a sister of cardinal Juraj Utješinović /George Utissenich alias George Martinuzzi/ (*1482; †1551), bishop of Oradea and archbishop of Esztergom. Having lived in turbulent and dangerous times of Ottoman invasion, Bartol's family moved from southern Croatia to Karlovac region in the west part of the country. During Juraj's childhood, his father died and he was raised by his mother and his influential uncle Utješinović. He was schooled for priesthood in Kraków (Poland) and Vienna (Austria). In 1550 he went to study law in Padua (Italy).

Drašković started his career as provost in Arad (Romania) and after that in Jasov (today in Slovakia). In 155.3 he was appointed secretary of the Holy Roman Emperor and Croato-Hungarian king Ferdinand I of Habsburg and in 1555. he took over the prepositure of Pozsony (present day Bratislava, Slovakia). On 22 April 1557, Drašković became bishop of Pécs in southern Hungary and in 1563. he took over the bishop's chair in Zagreb, the capital of the Kingdom of Croatia within the Habsburg monarchy, where he stayed until 1578.

== Ban of Croatia ==
In the meantime, he was chosen to be Ban of Croatia in 1567, together with knez (duke) Franjo Frankopan Slunjski, a member of Frankopan noble family. After Frankopan's death on 2 December 1572, Drašković reigned alone until 1574 and together with co-Ban Gašpar Alapić, former deputy viceroy, after that. During his reign, political and social situation in Croatia was extremely complicated, marked by Ottoman invasion, noblemen conflicts, Protestantism breakthrough and peasant revolts.

== Peasant revolt ==
Drašković supported the continuation of the feudal system and opposed reforms that would end serfdom, the Bishop himself held great estates and owned thousands of serfs, to prevent the Krajina example where Orthodox peasants had been freed by the Habsburgs in exchange by lifelong military service defending the borders, Drašković took a leading role in crushing the peasant revolt of 1573 led by Ambroz "Matija" Gubec. Drašković led the army of the nobility against the poorly armed peasant army, it is estimated that four to six thousand serfs were killed with the bodies of hundreds of them left hanging from trees across villages as a deterrent, Gubec was taken prisoner and brought to Zagreb where he was found guilty of treason. The Bishop deliberately spread rumours that Matija Gubec had been elected king by his co-conspirators, to set an example to any possible future rebels, the bishop had Gubec tortured in front of St. Mark's Church in Zagreb and then forced to wear a red-hot iron crown as “king of the peasants” before being quartered by four horses. In a letter to King Maximilian Drašković demanded permission to crown Gubec publicly with an iron crown.

We shall crown Gubec as an example, if Your Majesty allows, with an iron crown, red-hot, to be sure.

— Bishop Drašković asking permission from Austrian Emperor Maximilian to have rebel leader Matija Gubec tortured to death. 15 February 1573

He was regarded by contemporaries as a skilled theologian and politician, and held multiple high-ranking positions in both church and state.

== Later life ==
In 1574, Drašković was appointed archbishop of Kalocsa (Hungary), retaining the rule of Diocese of Zagreb. In 1578, he moved to Diocese of Győr and became at the same time the Royal Chancellor. Emperor and king Rudolf II of Habsburg promoted him and made him the royal governor of Hungary (1584), which is a title equal to Hungarian palatine.

Drašković became cardinal at the first consistory of Pope Sixtus V on 18 December 1585. On his way to Rome he suddenly died in Vienna on 31 January 1587, at the age of 61. He was buried in the Cathedral of Blessed Virgin Mary in Győr.

== See also ==
- Roman Catholic Archdiocese of Zagreb
- Ban of Croatia
- House of Drašković
- Croatian nobility
- Croatian–Slovene Peasant Revolt

Catholic Church titles
Preceded by Matija Bruman	Bishop of Zagreb; 1563–1578	Succeeded by Ivan Kranjčić Moslavački
