= Bjelina =

- Village
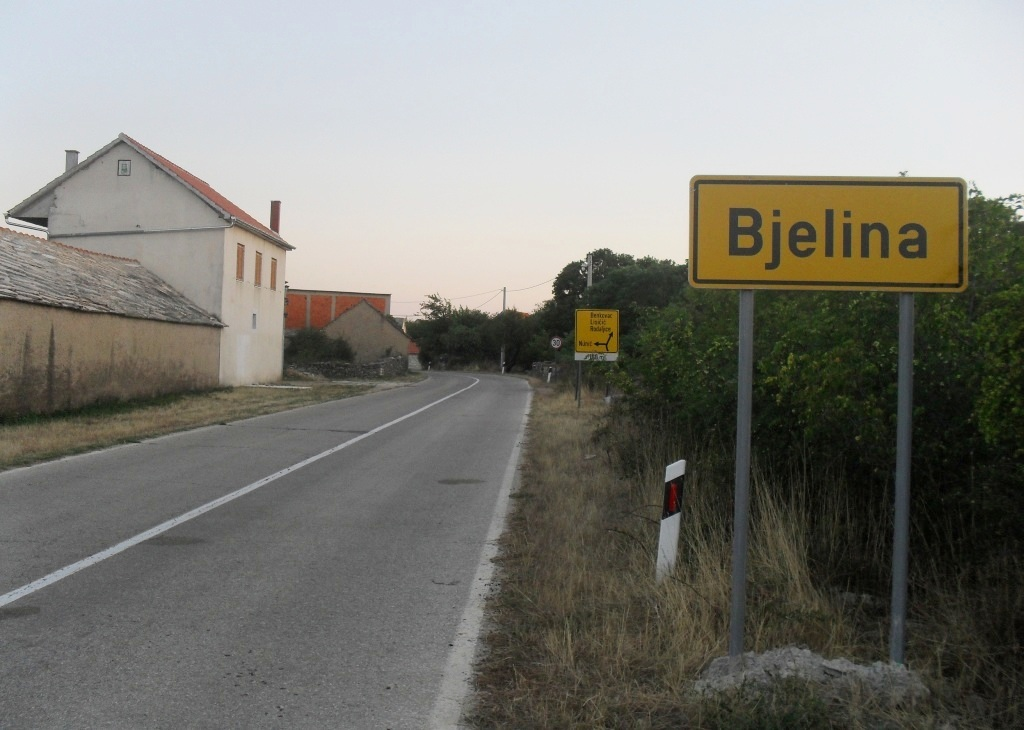
- Traffic sign at the village entrance
- Interactive map of Bjelina
- Location within Croatia
- Coordinates: 44°02′44″N 15°50′15″E
- Country: Croatia
- County: Zadar County
- Municipality: Benkovac

Area
  - Total: 25.3 km^{2} (9.8 sq mi)
- Elevation: 300 m (980 ft)

Population (2021)
  - Total: 82
  - Density: 3.2/km^{2} (8.4/sq mi)
- Time zone: UTC+1 (CET)
  - Summer (DST): UTC+2 (CEST)
- Postal code: 23421
- Area code: 023

Bjelina (Serbian Cyrillic: Бјелина) is a village westwards from the town of Knin in the Benkovac municipality of southern Croatia.

== Location ==
Bjelina is placed between Benkovac and Kistanje. It is located 20 km (12 mi) east of Benkovac.

== Population/Demographics ==
According to 1991 census, there were 652 inhabitants, of which 578 (88.65%) were Serbs; 70 (10.73%) were Croats and 4 others. According to national census of 2011, population of the settlement is 92.

== Bilina ==
Bilina is a historic late-medieval site close to modern Bjelina. Bilina is its medieval name, as opposed to post-Ottoman Bjelina. The site (44°03′N 15°50′E) is known as the seat of the Drašković noble family in the 15th century and in the beginning of the 16th century. Bartol (English: Bartholomew) Drašković, the head of the family, had an estate with the castle there. His wife Ana Drašković née Utješinović, a sister of the Catholic cardinal Juraj Utješinović (George Utissenich alias George Martinuzzi), bore him on February 5, 1525, the firstborn son Juraj (English: George), a famous Croatian Catholic Bishop, Cardinal and statesman, who was the Ban (Viceroy) of Croatia between 1567 and 1578.

Younger sons of Bartol and Ana, Ivan I (English: John) and Gašpar I (English: Casper), were most probably also born there. Shortly after that, because of the threatening Ottoman expansion, the family left its old seat and withdrew toward the northwest of Croatia.

As the Ottoman army soon conquered the whole area around Bilina, the Drašković family could not come back any more. Thus, the Draškovićs of Bilina became later Draškovićs of Trakošćan.
