= 1527 election in Cetin =

Assembly of the Croatian Parliament

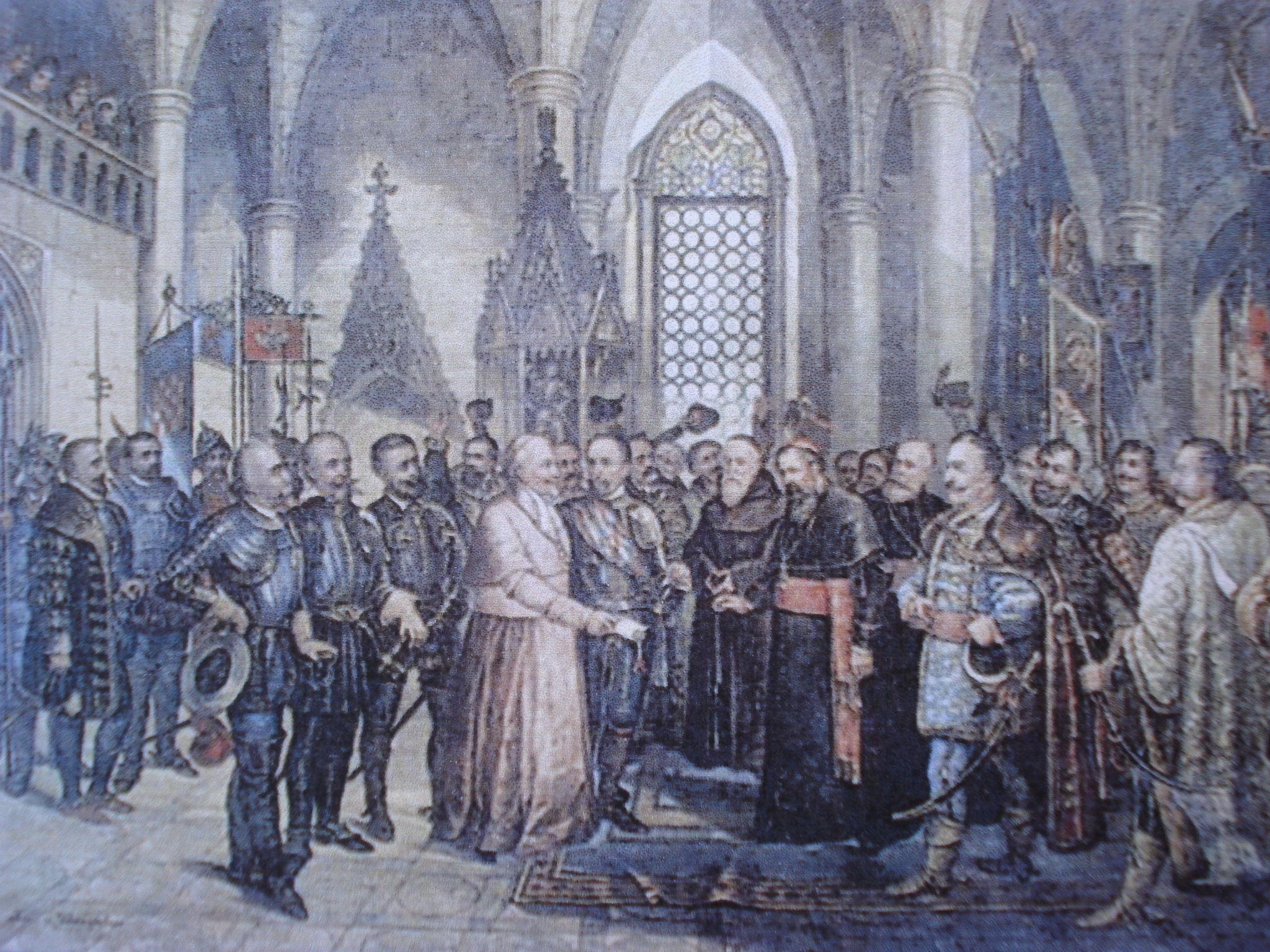
Croatian high nobility members (right) and the plenipotentiaries of Ferdinand I Habsburg (left) at the Parliament on Cetin, by Dragutin Weingärtner

The 1527 election in Cetin (Croatian: Cetinski / Cetingradski sabor, meaning Parliament on Cetin(grad) or Parliament of Cetin(grad), or Cetinski / Cetingradski izbor) was an assembly of the Croatian Parliament (Sabor) in the Cetin Castle in 1527. It followed a succession crisis in the Kingdom of Hungary caused by the death of Louis II, and which resulted in the Kingdom of Croatia joining the Habsburg monarchy. The charter electing the Habsburg Archduke of Austria Ferdinand I as King of Croatia was confirmed with the seals of six Croatian nobles.

== Battle of Mohács and the succession crisis ==
Faced with the overwhelming force of the Ottoman Empire, the nobility of the Kingdom of Croatia was alarmed as the Siege of Belgrade of 1521 caused the Kingdom of Hungary to lose its last fortress on the Danube to Suleiman the Magnificent. King Louis II showed no interest in defense, and was in a dire financial situation at the time. The Croatians appealed to the Pope, Venice, Emperor Charles V and Archduke Ferdinand for help, but had little success.

On 29 August 1526 at the Battle of Mohács happened catastrophic defeat of the Kingdom of Hungary, in which died King Louis II. Only few Croats participated in the battle (by arrangement with Ferdinand remained to defend the kingdom), and Christoph Frankopan with 5,000 men didn't manage to arrive at the battlefield (as Hungarians prematurely began the battle). As the king didn't have an heir, this caused monarchical crisis for the ruler of kingdoms of Hungary-Croatia and Bohemia, and the majority of Croatian magnates and members of lower nobility were keen to elect a new king.

In October 1526 the Bohemian Diet elected Ferdinand. At the session of the Diet of Hungary in Székesfehérvár on 10 November 1526, the majority of the Hungarian untitled lesser nobility (the gentry) chose John Zápolya to be the King of Hungary, and he was duly crowned with the Holy Crown of Hungary the next day. In Croatia he was supported by statesman Juraj Utišenić, diplomat Antun Vrančić, bishop Stjepan Brodarić, bishop Franjo Jožefić, and bishop János Statileo, and most importantly by former-Habsburg serviceman, Christoph Frankopan.

However, Ferdinand of Habsburg was also elected King of Hungary by the Hungarian higher aristocracy (the magnates or barons) and the Hungarian Catholic clergy in a rump Diet in Pozsony on 17 December 1526. The next day, the Slavonian Sabor convened by Christoph Frankopan elected Zápolya. Christoph Frankopan's diplomatic activity didn't have any success among Croatian nobility.

== Cetin ==
On the Habsburg's behalf, Nikola Jurišić and three other diplomats, successfully convened the Croatian Sabor. The Croatian nobles met at Cetin on 31 December 1526, to discuss their strategy and choose a new leader. The Austrian Archduke Ferdinand also sent his envoys to be present at the time of the parliament session. The assembly occurred in the Franciscan monastery of St. Mary below the Cetin Castle in the settlement of Cetingrad. At that time, the owner of the castle and the surrounding estate, where the assembly was held, was the Croatian nobleman Juraj III Frankopan.

Advocates of both options, after a long debate, finally agreed on Ferdinand on 1 January 1527. The election of Ferdinand was a natural one because he was not only the powerful Archduke of Austria, he also ruled the lands of Croatia's Slavic neighbours, the Slovenes, as both Duke of Carinthia and Carniola. Ferdinand I was elected the new King of Croatia, and the assembly "confirmed the succession to him and his heirs".

In return for the throne Ferdinand promised to respect the historic rights, freedoms, laws, and customs the Croats had when united with the Hungarian kingdom, and to defend Croatia from Ottoman invasion and subjugation at all times with 1000 horsemen, 200 soldiers, and finance for another 800 horsemen. He also had an obligation to inspect and supply the fortified cities. The horsemen would be divided between the noblemen, and even among those who didn't participate at the election, but probably supported the outcome (like Budački, Drašković, Patačić, Ajtić, Tomašić, Farkašić and so on).

=== Charter ===
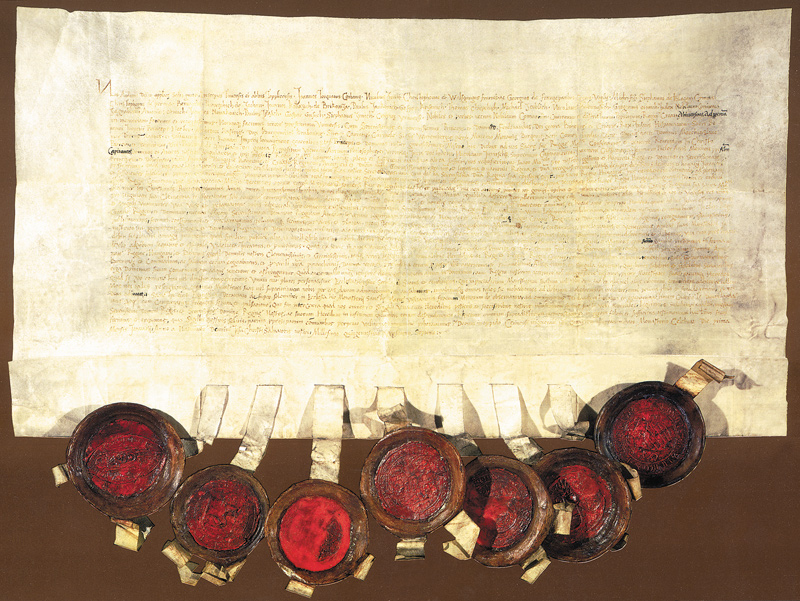
The charter from Cetingrad is preserved in the National Archives of Austria in Vienna.

The charter signed by the Croatian nobles, which bears a fine example of the chequered seal of Croatia, is claimed as "among the most important documents of Croatian statehood", showing a special political status of Croatia at that time coming out of it. The charter confirmed at the same time the ancient rights of Croatian nobility to self-regulate the major issues – among which was the election of a king – freely and independently, regardless of opinion or decision of Hungarian Diet, since the two countries were in the personal union from 1102.

The text of the Charter contains first the listing of names of the present Croatian high nobility members, church dignitaries and low nobility members, as well as names and titles of Ferdinand's plenipotentiaries, then the quotation of arguments for the legally valid election of a Habsburger to be the hereditary ruler of Croatia, further the declaratory statement of recognition and announcement of the Austrian archduke as king and his wife Anna (sister of Louis II) as queen, and finally "the swearing-in of loyalty, obedience and allegiance". Place and date of issue are specified at the end of the text as well.

The mentioned Croatian nobles are Andrija the Bishop of Knin and Abbot of Topusko, Ivan Karlović of Krbava, Nikola III Zrinski, brothers Krsto II and Vuk I Frankopan of Tržac, Juraj III Frankopan of Slunj, Stjepan Blagajski, Krsto Peranski, Bernard Tumpić Zečevski (of Zečevo), Ivan Kobasić Brikovički (of Brekovica), Pavao Janković, Gašpar Križanić, Toma Čipčić, Mihajlo Skoblić, Nikola Babonožić, Grgur Otmić, noble judge of the Zagreb County, Antun Otmić, Ivan Novaković, Pavao Izačić, Gašpar Gusić, and Stjepan Zimić, while the Austrian plenipotentiaries present were Paul von Oberstein (Provost of Vienna and Ferdinand's Geheimrat), Nikola Jurišić and Ivan Katzianer (Ferdinand's chief military commanders), and Johann Püchler (Prefect of the town of Mehov).

=== Seals ===
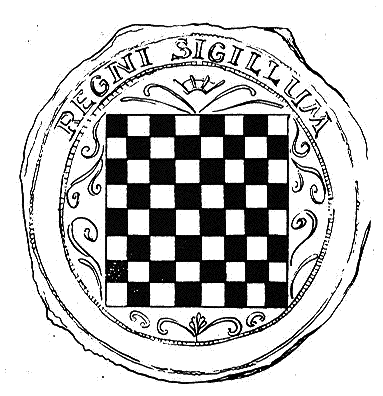
Royal seal of the Kingdom of Croatia is imprinted in the middle of Cetingrad Charter

Beneath the text there are six seals of most notable Croatian magnates and dignitaries to verify the Charter, as well in the middle a seal of the Kingdom of Croatia, in the following sequence:

Left side

- Andrija Tuškanić (or Andrija Mišljenović Uzdoljski), Bishop of Knin
- Ivan Karlović, from the Kurjaković branch of the Gusić's, Ban of Croatia 1521–1524 and 1527–1531.
- Nikola III Zrinski, from the Zrinski branch of the Šubić's.

Center

- A chequered seal of the Kingdom of Croatia.

Right side

- Juraj III Frankopan, from the Slunj branch of the Frankopan's.
- Vuk I Frankopan, from the Tržac branch of the Frankopan's.
- Stjepan IX Blagajski, from the Blagaj branch of the Babonić's.

== Aftermath ==
Ferdinand's plenipotentiaries took over the Charter from the Croats and took it with them on their way back to Vienna. In return, earlier that day, in a document called the Coronation Oath, they confirmed the promises and assurances of Ferdinand (given before upon the previous demands of the Croats), and accepted all the related obligations and responsibilities of the new-elected king.

Before their return to Vienna, the plenipotentiaries wrote a letter to their principal on 3 January 1527 in which they informed him about the sequence of events during the parliament session and explained their delay and longer stay in Croatia than expected before (among other things, some of Croatian magnates did not have their seals with them, but needed to go home and to verify the Charter afterwards).

On 6 January 1527, Slavonian nobility led by Christoph Frankopan distanced themselves from this election and insisted on John Zápolya as the rightful claimant to the Hungarian throne instead, referring to a 1505 decision by the Hungarian Diet that the new monarch cannot be a foreigner. Roughly months later, as Ferdinand didn't keep election promises well, the Croatian nobility again gathered in Cetin and complained that "let Your Majesty know that no gentleman can be found who would rule Croatia by force. For after the death of our last king, Zvonimir of happy memory, we freely joined the holy crown of the Kingdom of Hungary, and after that now to Your Majesty".

A civil war erupted, with Ferenc Batthyány leading the pro-Habsburg faction and Christoph Frankopan leading the pro-Zápolya faction. On 3 November 1527, Ferdinand was eventually crowned in the Hungarian city of Székesfehérvár. The Austrian option prevailed, first in the Croatian-Slavonian parts after Christoph Frankopan's death in 1527 (replaced by Simon Erdődy), and ultimately after Zápolya's death in 1540 (who also asked for help from the Ottomans, resulting in the Habsburg–Ottoman wars in Hungary and formation of Ottoman Hungary).

== Legacy ==
The charter is preserved at the National Archives of Austria in Vienna.

The Constitution of Croatia describes these events as one of the historical foundations of Croatian sovereignty, as an "independent and sovereign decision of the Croatian Parliament".

== See also ==
- Croatia in the union with Hungary

== Sources ==
- Budak, Neven (2002). "Habsburzi i Hrvati – Cetingradski izbor" [Habsburgs and the Croats – Cetingrad election]. Kolo (3).
- Milan Kruhek: Cetin, grad izbornog sabora Kraljevine Hrvatske 1527, Karlovačka Županija, 1997, Karlovac
