= Dizdar =

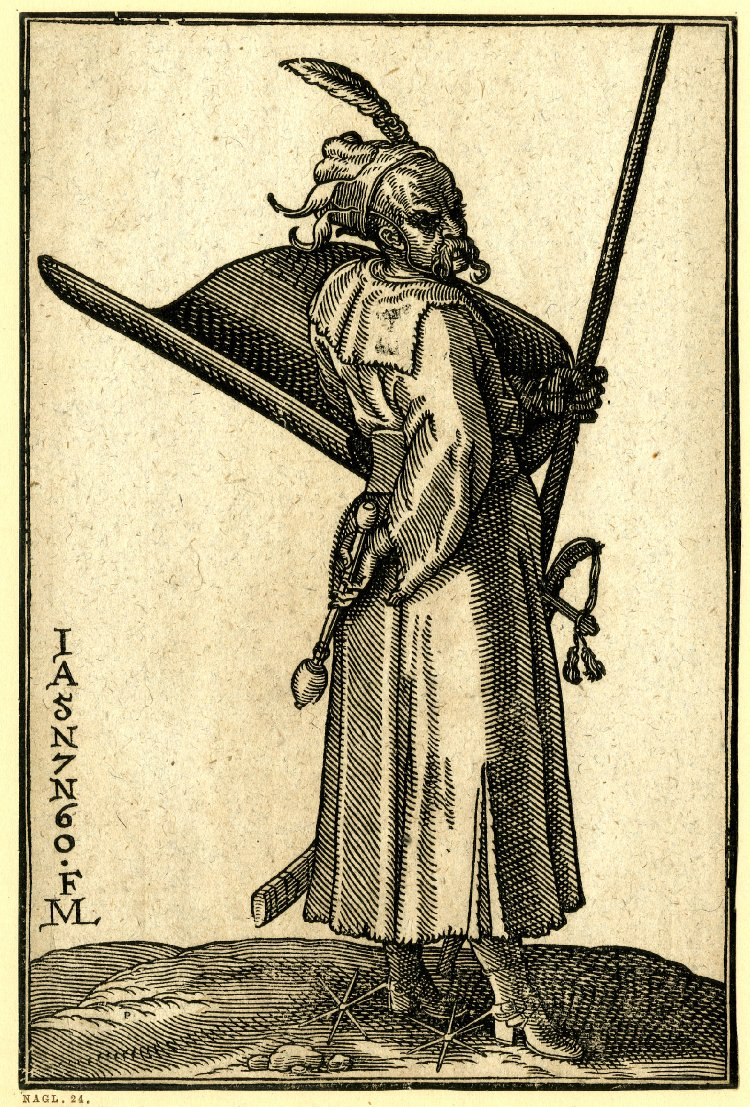
Ottoman Dizdar from the 16th century (author: Melchior Lorck)

Dizdar (Persian: دیزدار, romanized: dizdār; Turkish: dizdar, kale muhafızı) was the title given in the Ottoman Empire to a castle warden or fortress commander, who was appointed to manage troops and keep the fortress in its role as a defence point.

The word is of Persian origin and means gatekeeper, watchman, guardsman or castellan. It spread to the west following the Ottoman conquest of the Balkans.

The dizdar commanded military unit in the fortress, but at the same time, he was responsible for the settlement (village or town) under or around it as well because the purpose of the fortress was to defend the area.

As a commander, the dizdar had his deputy, called chekhaya (Turkish: kâhya), and other subordinates (e.g. yasakci). His superiors were the captain, sanjak-bey and other senior military officers.

In 1839, after the Tanzimat reforms, the Ottoman Empire abolished captaincies, and titles like captain and dizdar ceased to exist.

== See also ==
- Dizdarević, Bosniak surname derived from the word dizdar
- Agha
- Bey
- Serdar
