= Cetin Castle =

Medieval fortress in Cetingrad, Croatia

- Cetingrad, Croatia
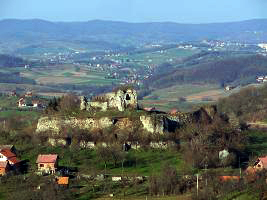
- Cetingrad castle remains

Site information
- Type: Fortress
- Controlled by: King of Hungary (before 1387); Frankopan family (1387-1408); Zrinski family (1408-1413); Frankopan family (1387-1408); Counts of Okić (1429-1439); Frankopan family (1449-1536); Ottoman Empire(1536-1559); Habsburg Empire(1559-1584) -deserted (1584-1646); Ottoman Empire(1646-1790); Habsburg Empire(1790-1809); French Empire(1809-1815); Austrian Empire(1815-1866)
- Condition: ruins

Location
- Location within Croatia

Site history
- Built: unknown

Garrison information
- Designations

Cultural Good of Croatia
- Type: Protected cultural good
- Reference no.: Z-276

The fortress of Cetin is situated 5 kilometres (3 mi) south of Cetingrad above the village of Podcetin, in Croatia. The castle and its immediate surrounding represent a monument of great value for Croatian national history because on this place in 1527 Croatian nobility elected Ferdinand I Habsburg a king of Croatia. From that moment on, Croatia remained a part of Habsburg Monarchy until the end of World War I.

== Etymology ==
According to Croatian historian Radoslav Lopašić, the name Cetin means: " a place covered with dense and dark forest".

== History ==
The moment when Cetin castle was built is unknown. There are some indications that a settlement existed there in the times of the Roman Empire. The Parish of All Saints, in which the fortress is situated, was first mentioned in 1334. In 1387, king Sigismund, Holy Roman Emperor, donated Cetin to Ivan of Krk, hence the castle became the property of the Frankopan family.

The Middle Ages were the golden era of Cetin. In the 15th century, the Cetinski branch of Frankopan family was formed. It only lasted a hundred years. Ivan Frankopan of Cetin died in the Battle of Krbava field. His brother Grgur and son Franjo Frankopan became archbishops of Kalocsa. Franjo Frankopan was the last member of the Frankopan Cetinski family. After him, the fortress became property of the Frankopan Slunjski family.

Cetin was mentioned on 22 February 1481 in a document freeing the citizens of Grič from tariffs in Cetin and elsewhere.

Cetin played an important role in the history of Croatia. After the defeat at the Battle of Mohács in 1526, Croatian nobility gathered at the Parliament on Cetin (Cetinski sabor). On 1 January 1527, they elected Ferdinand I, Archduke of Austria as the king of Croatia. The chart signed by Croatian nobles and representatives of Ferdinand of Habsburg is among the most important documents of Croatian statehood and it is preserved in the Austrian State Archives in Vienna. In 1537, the castle garrison consisted of 30 haramijas.

In the following centuries, Cetin was part of the Croatian Military Frontier - the borderland between the Habsburg monarchy and the Ottoman Empire. During this period, the Ottoman Army managed to take control of it several times. The fortress was often damaged and repaired. Two stone plates with Ottoman Turkish inscriptions in the Croatian History Museum testify about reconstructions made in this period.

In 1790, Habsburg Army troops under the command of general Walisch finally reconquered Cetin Castle for the Habsburg monarchy. The siege lasted one month, and after the battle several officers were decorated, including Johann I Josef, Prince of Liechtenstein. Cetin's status was finally confirmed during the peace conference in Sistova.

In 1809, Ottoman forces once again occupied Cetin but they withdrew the following year under the threats of Marshal Marmont, governor-general of Illyrian provinces. He forced Ottomans to withdraw from Cetin after briefly occupying Bihać. He was promised to not enter again to French Croatia. Once the Ottoman threat abated the fortress was abandoned and turned into a quarry. Administrative control of the surrounding area was transferred to the village of Cetingrad, which developed north of Cetin.

== Description ==
Close to the castle, there used to be a Franciscan monastery of st Mary and several churches. In the aftermath of the 1790 siege the Austrians used the remains of the old monastery to repair the fortifications on the fort.

== Gallery ==
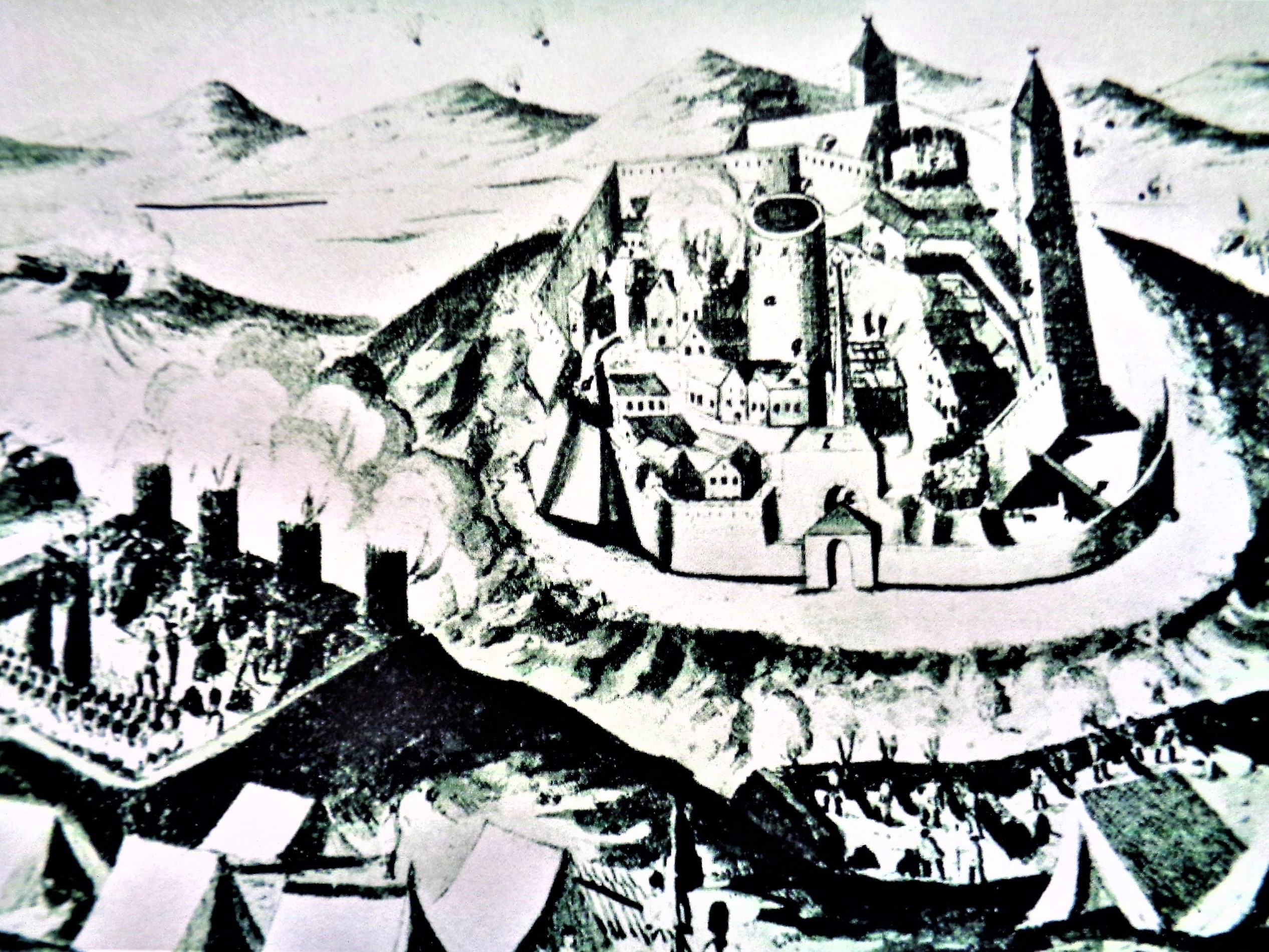
A depiction of 1790 Habsburg siege of the castle.

Castle layout from 1790

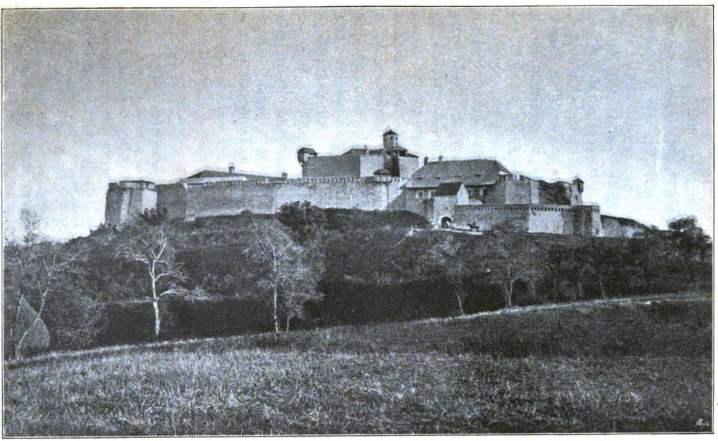
A 19th century photo of the castle..

== See also ==
- 1527 election in Cetin

== Literature ==
- Radoslav Lopašić: Oko Kupe i Korane, Matica hrvatska, 1895, Zagreb
- Milan Kruhek: Cetin, grad izbornog sabora Kraljevine Hrvatske 1527, Karlovac County, 1997, Karlovac
- Iz memoara maršala Marmonta: ilirske uspomene 1806–1811, Čakavski Sabor, 1977, Split
