= Nehaj =

Nehaj may refer to:

- Nehaj (hill), also known as Trbušnjak, a hill near Senj, Croatia
- Nehaj Fortress, a medieval fortification near Senj
- NK Nehaj, a football club from Senj
- Nehaj, a medieval castle in Kaštel Štafilić, Croatia
