= Rotondo =

Rotondo is an Italian surname. Notable people with the surname include:

- Anthony Rotondo (born 1957), American mobster
- Giovanni Rotondo, composer
- Nunzio Rotondo (1924–2009), Italian jazz trumpeter and bandleader
- Paolo Rotondo, New Zealand actor
- Reed Rotondo (born 1980), American poet

== See also ==
- Castle Rotondo, a castle in Croatia
