= Kaštel Štafilić =

- Settlement
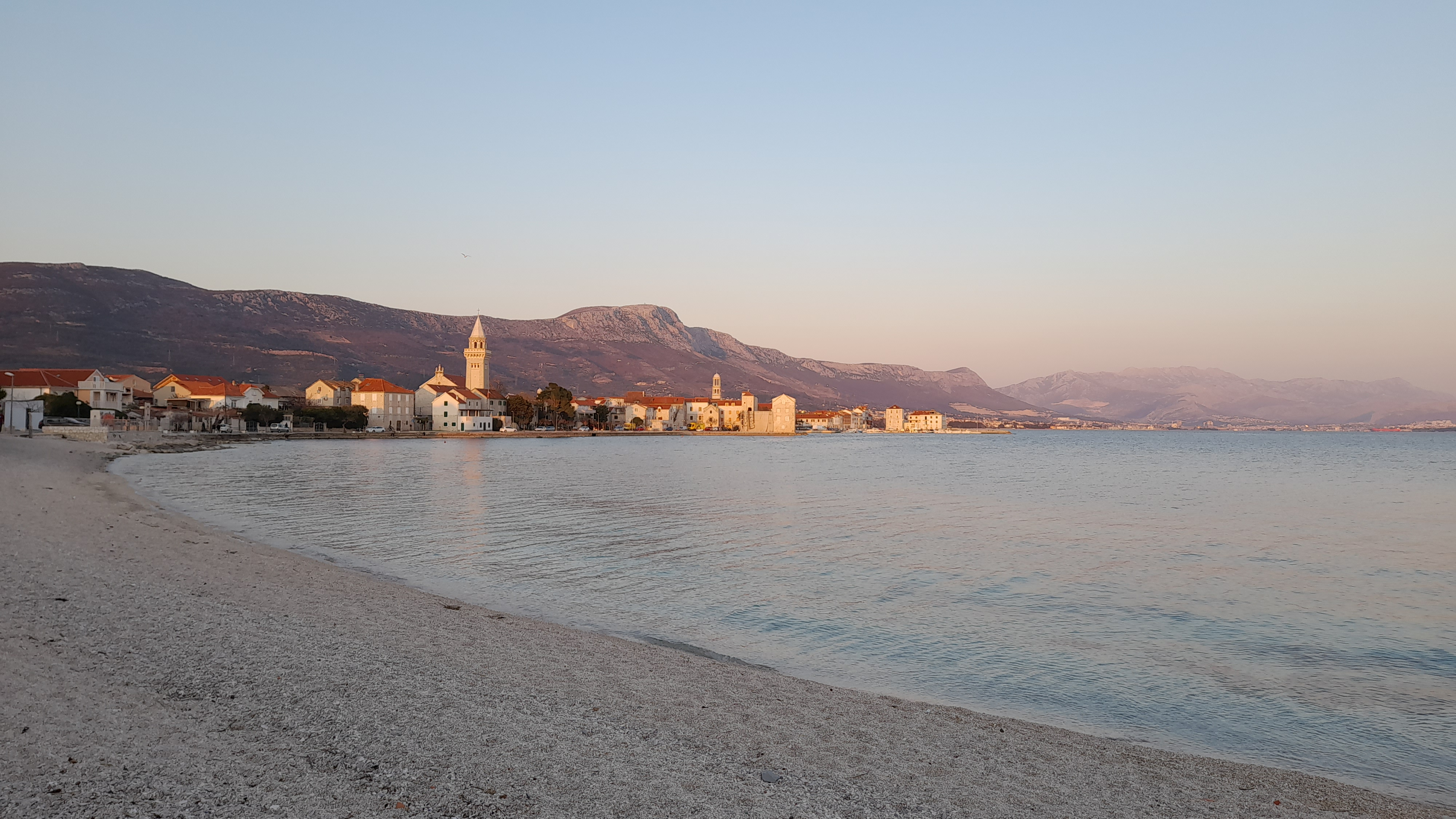
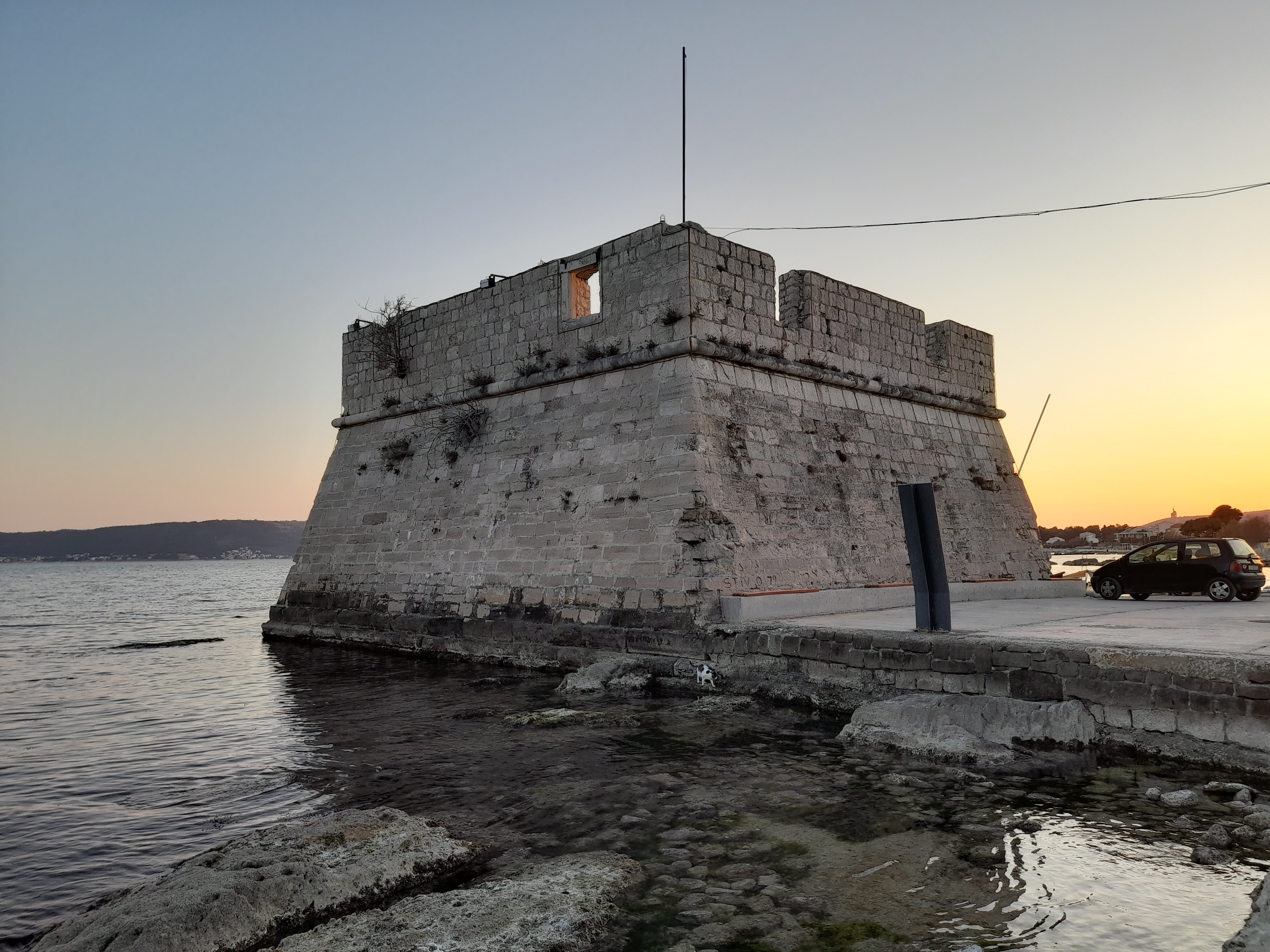
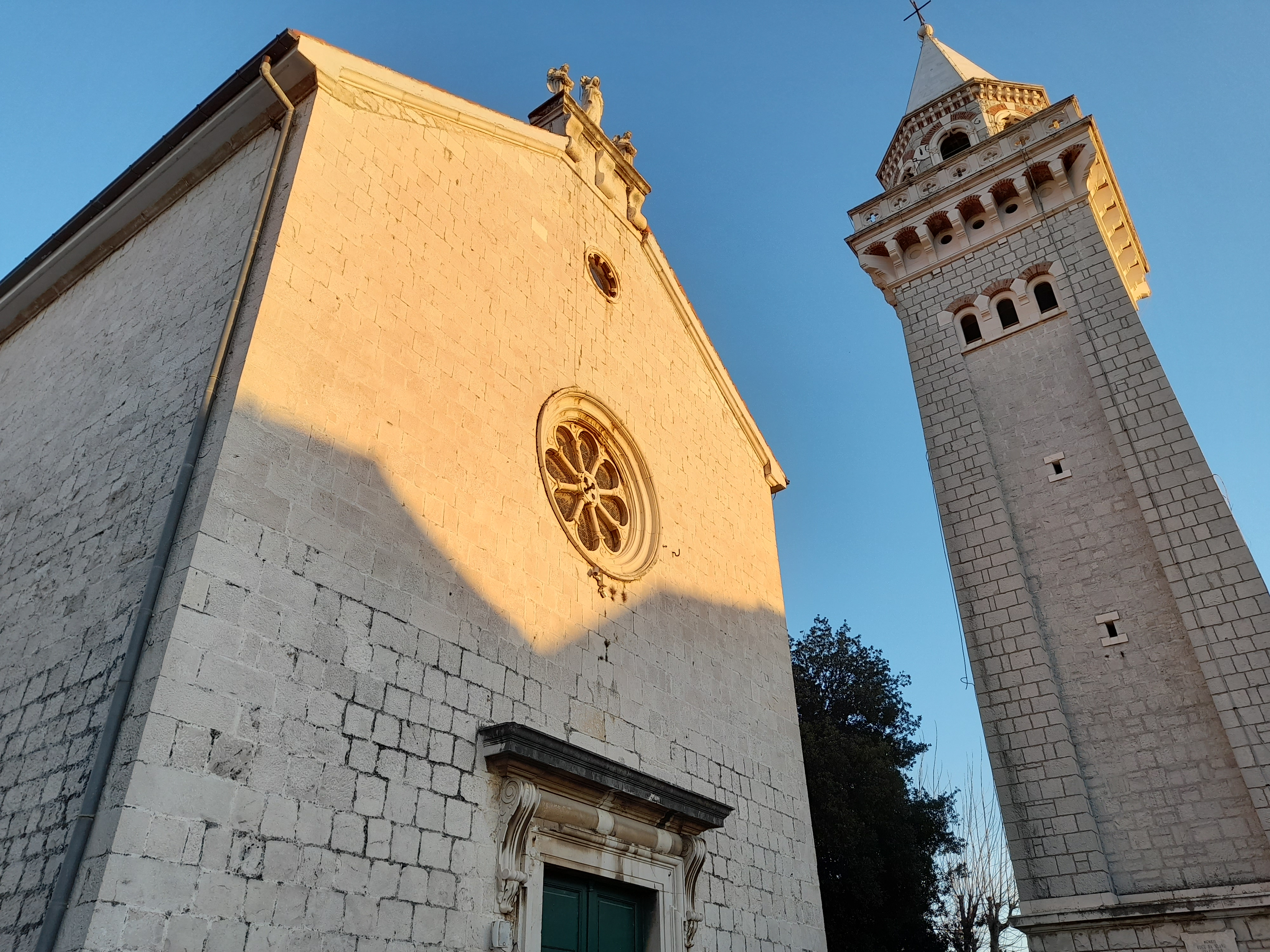
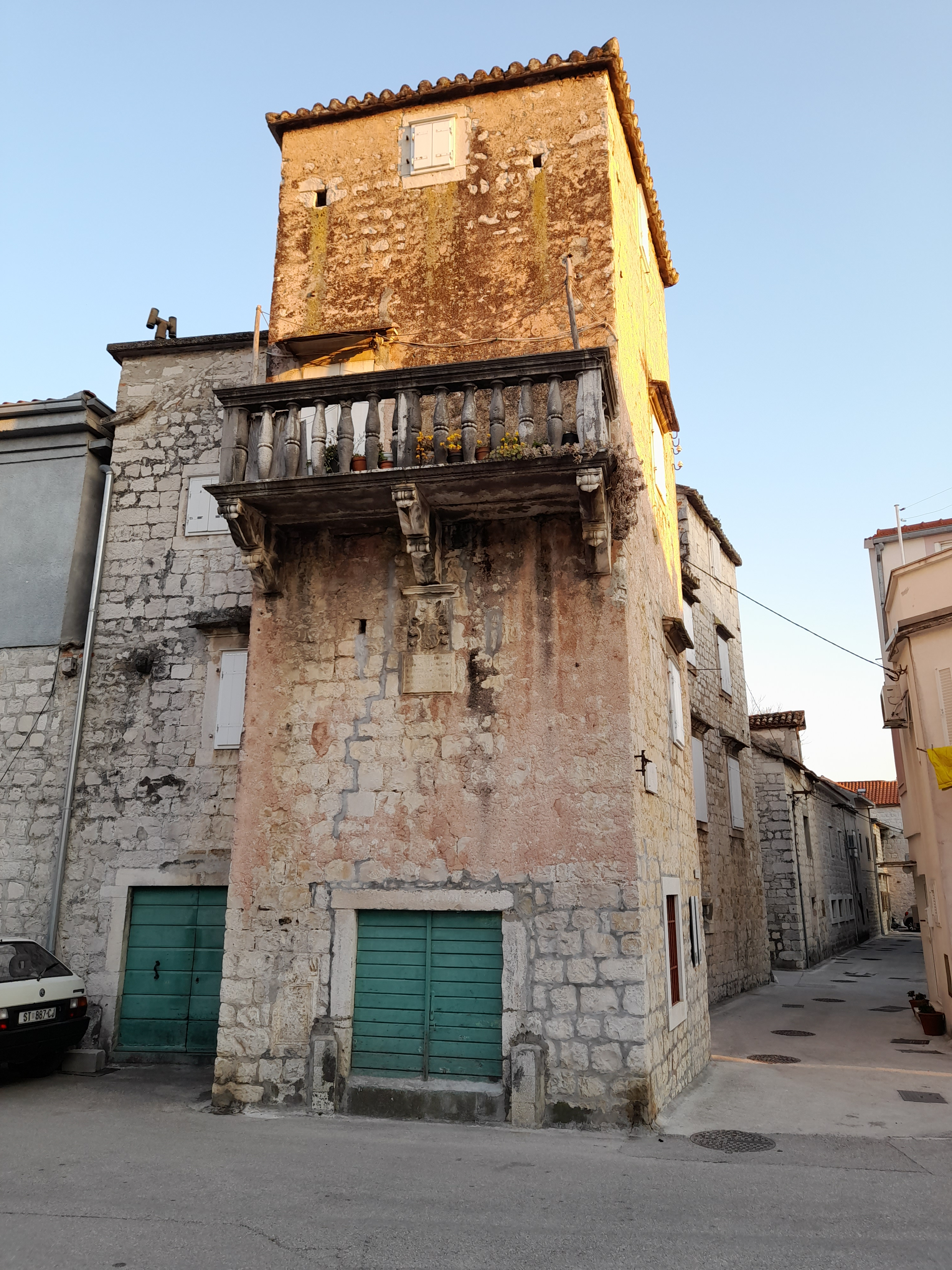
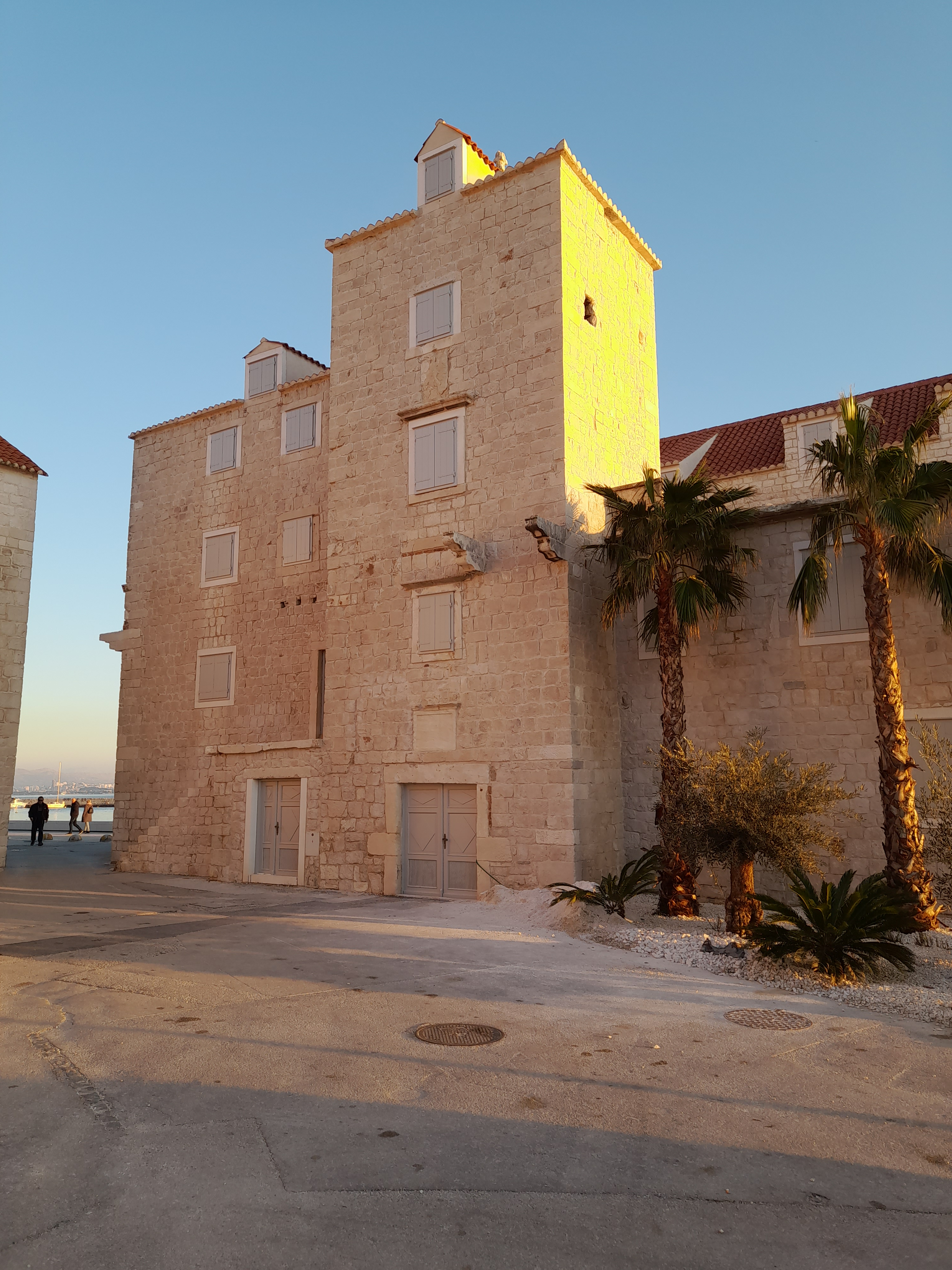
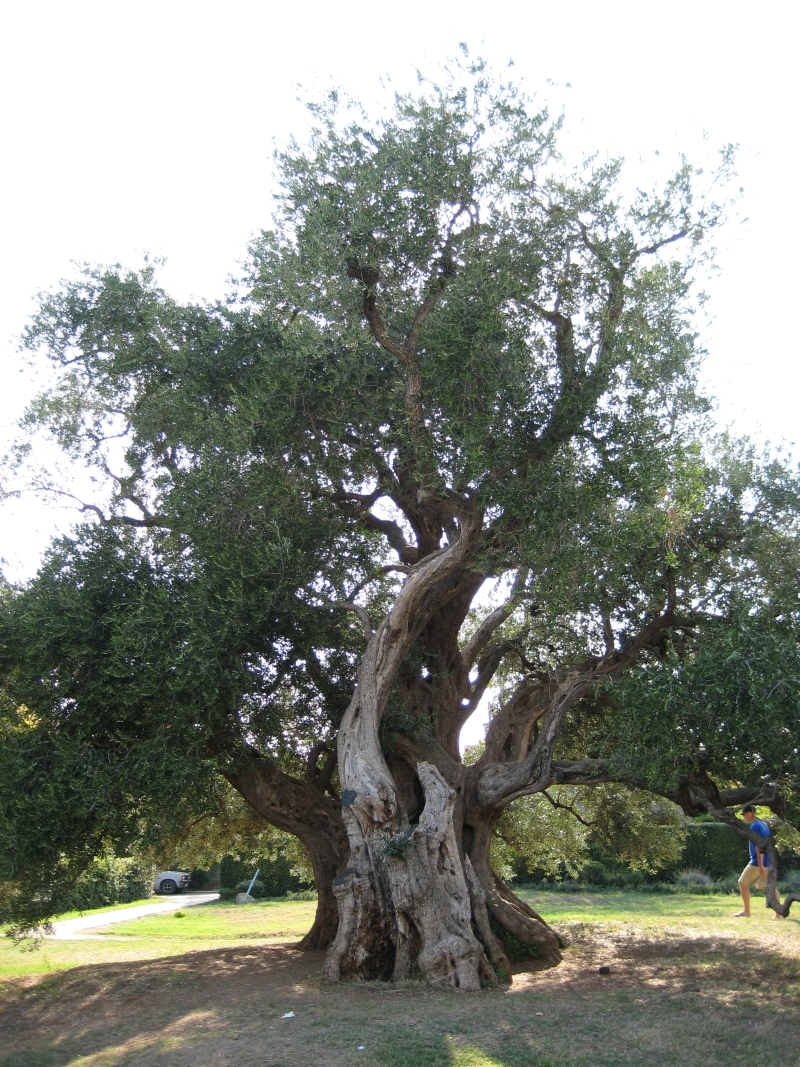
- Clockwise from top: Panorama of Kaštel Štafilić, Immaculate Conception church, 1,500 year old Olive tree, Castle Rotondo, Old town and Nehaj fortress
- Interactive map of Kaštel Štafilić
- Location within Croatia
- Coordinates: 43°32′53″N 16°19′59″E
- Country: Croatia
- County: Split-Dalmatia
- City: Kaštela

Area
  - Total: 9.9 km^{2} (3.8 sq mi)

Population (2021)
  - Total: 2,822
  - Density: 290/km^{2} (740/sq mi)
- Time zone: UTC+1 (CET)
  - Summer (DST): UTC+2 (CEST)

Kaštel Štafilić is a settlement within the town of Kaštela in Dalmatia, Croatia.

== Sites ==
=== City square and promenade ===
Kaštel Štafilić's most majestic feature, is its old stone village, with its main square. It is situated on a long seafront, home to numerous summer festivals, and events.

One aspect that unites all the Kaštela’s, is a common promenade, where one can visit 6 other Kaštela’s, or go west, and take a leisurely stroll until they finally get to Trogir.

=== Resnik ===
The Resnik area in the west of Kaštel Štafilić is a known archaeological site, with underwater findings from the Middle Palaeolithic, the Neolithic and the Roman period.

The Split Airport has been located in the inland area just northwest of Resnik since 1966. This is the second busiest airport in Croatia.

=== Castle Rotondo ===
Castle Rotondo is an old castle first built in 1508, situated by a sea cliff. It is named after the noble family, Rotondo who owned, and inhabited for 400 years. It was initially built on an island, but was later linked to the land with a movable bridge. Its purpose was to protect the villagers from the pillaging of the Ottomans.

=== Mastrinka - Old Olive Tree ===
The Mastrinka Olive Tree is more than 1500 years old. It shows that the processing and cultivation of olive trees in Kastela has taken place since ancient times. The tree is 11 meters high, with a radius of 23 m. The trunk is dry and hollow, but over the years around it has grown new branches and shoots.

The oil obtained from the olives, on the olive tree, is sold as a souvenir in small bottles in the town museum, in Kastela. In 1990, the tree was officially inducted into UNESCO's World Heritage List.

=== Castle Nehaj ===
The Nehaj is a seaside castle or fortress which started to be built by the Lodi family in 1548. It was probably named Nehaj after Uskoks from Senj's Nehaj Fortress arrived to inhabit it later. The building is designated in the cultural properties register in Croatia.

== See also ==
- Kaštela
