= Register of Cultural Goods of Croatia =

The Register of Cultural Goods of the Republic of Croatia (Croatian: Registar kulturnih dobara Republike Hrvatske) was established in 1999. The Croatian Ministry of Culture is responsible for the administration of this public register, which has been created according to the Act on the protection and preservation of cultural goods of 1999 (Croatian Zakon o zaštiti i očuvanju kulturnih dobara) (art. 14, OG 69/99). The register is a comprehensive list of all cultural monuments (Croatian: spomenik kulture) under national protection.

== Lists ==
The register contains the following specialized lists:

- List of protected cultural goods (Lista zaštićenih kulturnih dobara)
- List of cultural goods of national significance (Lista kulturnih dobara nacionalnog značenja)
- List of preventively protected goods (Lista preventivno zaštićenih dobara)

== Constitution ==
The Croatian constitution stipulates that the protection of cultural goods, as well as their use needs to be regulated according to the constitution and laws of the Republic of Croatia (art. 2).

The constitution further stipulates:

Article 52

The sea, the coast and islands, waters, airspace, mining resources and other natural treasures, but also land property, woods, plants and animals, other parts of nature, immovable property and items of particular cultural, historic, economic and ecologic significance, which are of interest for the Republic of Croatia according to law, have its particular protection.

More, morska obala i otoci, vode, zračni prostor, rudno blago i druga prirodna bogatstva, ali i zemljište, šume, biljni i životinjski svijet, drugi dijelovi prirode, nekretnine i stvari od osobitog kulturnoga, povijesnog, gospodarskog i ekološkog značenja, za koje je zakonom određeno da su od interesa za Republiku Hrvatsku, imaju njezinu osobitu zaštitu.

== Examples ==
According to the Act on the protection and preservation of cultural goods, the Croatian Ministry of Culture regularly publishes registry changes. As of November 2025, there are 6,798 immovable and intangible cultural assets across whole Croatia.

Some examples of protected national monuments are:

- Episcopal Complex of the Euphrasian Basilica in the Historic Centre of Poreč
- Old City of Dubrovnik
- Fortress Nehaj in Senj
- Trakošćan Castle
- Veliki Tabor Castle
- Udbina Castle
- Sponza Palace
- Art Pavilion, Zagreb
- Ethnographic Museum, Zagreb
- Faculty of Law, University of Zagreb
- Governor's Palace
- Nikola Tesla Technical Museum
- Rector's Palace, Dubrovnik
- Hrvatski državni arhiv
- Vatroslav Lisinski Concert Hall
- Klovićevi Dvori Gallery
- Glyptotheque (Zagreb)
- Church of Holy Salvation
- Cathedral of St. James Senior in Krbava
- Priory of Vrana
- Stadion Poljud
- Castle Rotondo
- Savoy Castle, Bilje
- Cathedral of Saint Bartholomew in Kapitul
- Zagreb Glavni kolodvor
- Fortress of Klis
- Pejačević Castle in Virovitica
- Vukovar water tower
- Zagreb Cathedral
- Cathedral of St. James in Šibenik
- Cathedral of St. Lawrence in Trogir
- Zrinski Castle in Čakovec
- Vojković palace, Zagreb

== Intangible Cultural Heritage in Croatia ==
According to the UNESCO Intangible Heritage Lists, the Croatian Intangible Cultural Heritage is particularly rich. As of 2015, 14 Intangible Cultural Heritages have been added to the UNESCO list:

- Annual carnival bell ringers’ pageant from the Kastav area
- Gingerbread craft from northern Croatia – Licitar
- Ojkanje singing
- Lacemaking in Croatia
- Procession Za Križen (Following the Cross) on the island of Hvar
- The Sinjska alka, a knights' tournament in Sinj
- Spring procession of Ljelje/Kraljice (queens) from Gorjani
- Festivity of Saint Blaise, patron saint of Dubrovnik
- Traditional manufacturing of children's wooden toys in Hrvatsko Zagorje
- Two-part singing and playing in the Istrian scale
- Bećarac singing and playing from Eastern Croatia
- Nijemo Kolo, silent circle dance of the Dalmatian hinterland
- Klapa multipart singing of Dalmatia, southern Croatia
- Mediterranean diet, shared with Cyprus, Spain, Greece, Italy, Morocco, and Portugal

The Republic of Croatia has so far entered 65 elements of intangible cultural heritage in the national Registry.

== See also ==
- Croatian art
- Culture of Croatia
- World Heritage Sites in Croatia
