= Croatian History Museum =

- Hrvatski povijesni muzej
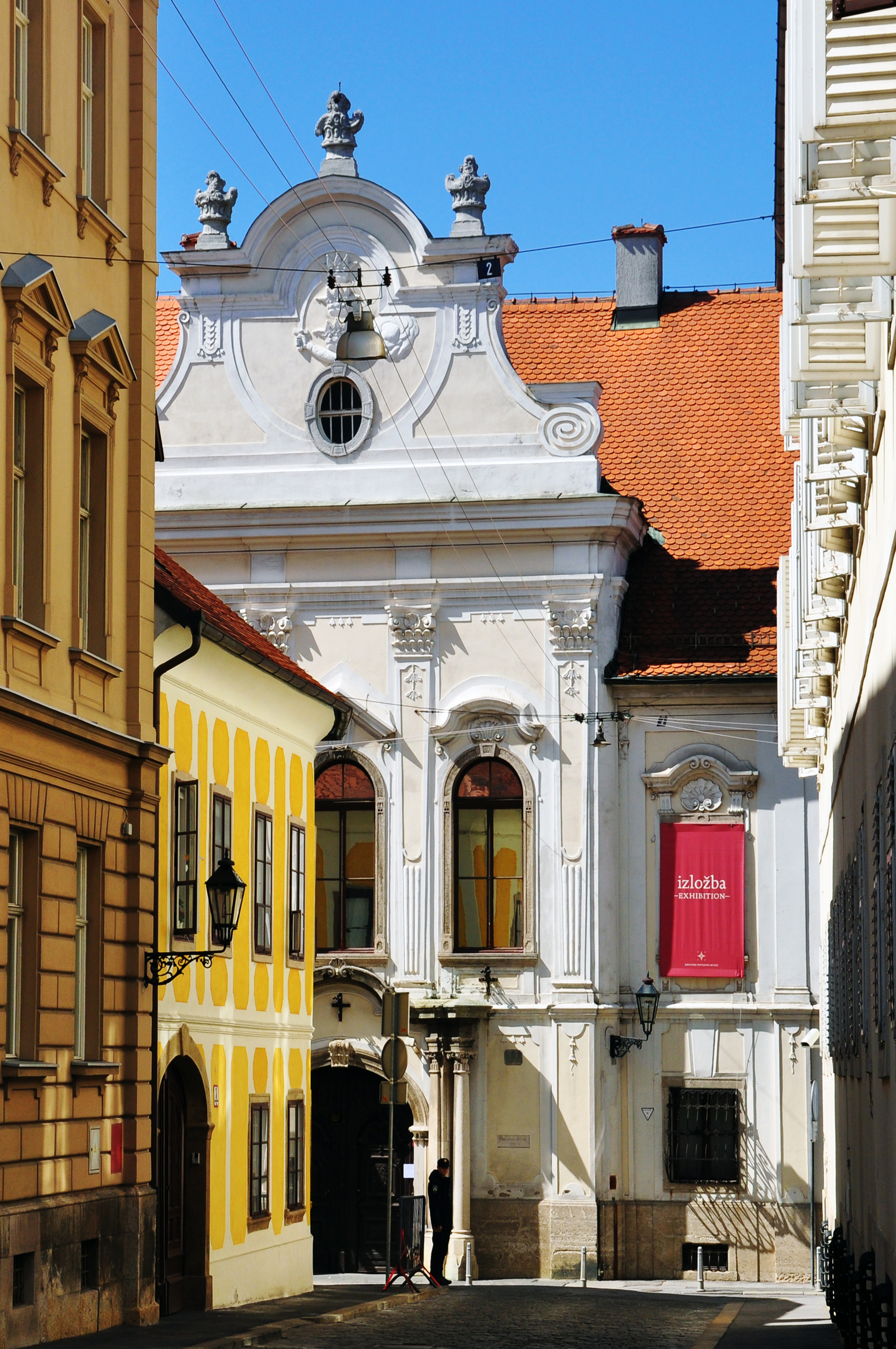
- Entrance of the Croatian History Museum building
- Former name: Croatian National Historic Museum
- Established: 26 July 1940; 86 years ago
- Location: Matoševa 9, Zagreb, Croatia; Grič 3, Zagreb, Croatia
- Coordinates: 45.8160°N 15.9723°E; 45.8147°N 15.9720°E
- Type: History museum
- Accreditation: Croatian Museum Council
- Collections: 17
- Collection size: 300,000
- Visitors: 12,167 (2017)
- Website: www.hismus.hr/en

Croatian History Museum (Croatian: Hrvatski povijesni muzej) is a museum of history located in the Vojković palace on Antun Gustav Matoš Street and the Ludovik Jelačić palace on Grič Street in the historic Gornji Grad district of Zagreb, Croatia. The museum holdings consist of around 300,000 objects divided into 17 collections. In addition to a part of the Meštrović Pavilion, it also administers the Ivan Goran Kovačić Memorial Museum in Lukovdol.

== History ==
The museum was formed in 1940 as the Croatian National Historic Museum (Croatian: Hrvatski narodni historički muzej), stemming from the former National Museum (Croatian: Narodni muzej), which was formed in 1846 (see also Croatian Natural History Museum).

The museum currently does not have a permanent display, holding only temporary exhibitions due to a long-standing lack of space. To remedy this problem, the building of the Zagreb Tobacco Factory (Croatian: Tvornica duhana Zagreb) was assigned to the museum in 2007, but the plan was eventually abandoned as the building was reassigned to the Croatian Conservation Institute (Croatian: Hrvatski restauratorski zavod), and the museum remained at its primary location in the Vojković palace on Matoš Street. Both the Matoš Street building and the museum's institutional operations were severely impacted by the 2020 Zagreb earthquake, forcing the museum to close its doors to visitors.

Following the earthquake, a new permanent resolution was reached. The museum is expanding its future permanent exhibition across two locations in the Gornji grad: its existing palace on Matoš Street and the historic Ludovik Jelačić Palace at Grič 3—the former headquarters of the Croatian Meteorological and Hydrological Service (Croatian: DHMZ). Comprehensive earthquake reconstruction and structural conversion of the Grič 3 palace began in 2023, with design contracts for the permanent exhibition finalized in early 2026. The combined spaces are slated to debut the museum's first complete permanent display of Croatian history.

== Collection ==
The museum holdings are part of 17 collections:

- Archaeology Collection
- Arms and Armoury Collection
- Collection of Decorations, Plaques, Medals and Badges
- Documentary Collection I
- Documentary Collection II
- Collection of Flags and Streamers
- Heraldry and Sphragistic Collection
- Map Collection
- Miscellaneous Collection
- Numismatic Collection
- Collection of Objects from Everyday Life
- Collection of Paintings, Prints and Sculptures
- Collection of Photographs, Films and Negatives
- Collection of Religious Artefacts
- Collection of Stone Monuments
- Twentieth Century Art Collection
- Uniform Collection

The holdings are housed in the Vojković Palace and part of the Meštrović Pavilion.

== Library ==
The library of the Croatian History Museum was founded as a department of the National Museum. In 1854, the National Museum library held over 10,000 volumes. It was gradually enlarged through buying and donations, through the work of the National Museum director Spiridon Brusina. At the split of the National Museum into specialised museums, its library was split as well. The library of the Croatian History Museum was in 1959 housed in the museum building in the Vojković Palace, where it remains today. The library contains c. 20,000 books, including four incunabula and several manuscripts, as well as a number of books printed as early as the 17th century. The primary method of book acquisition are donations and book exchanges, leading to an average of 300 new books yearly.

== Gallery ==
=== Collection of paintings ===
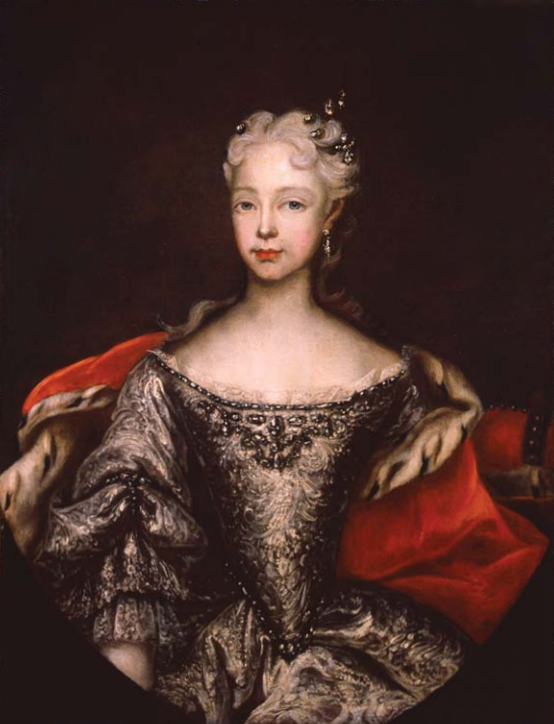
Maria Theresa by Frans van Stampart
18th century

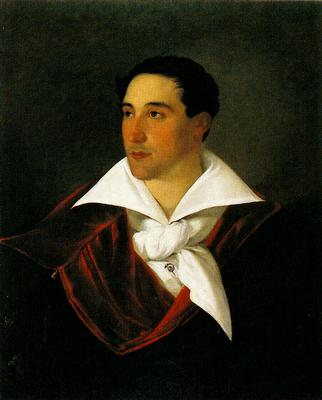
Đuro Jelačić Bužimski by Mihael Stroj
1832

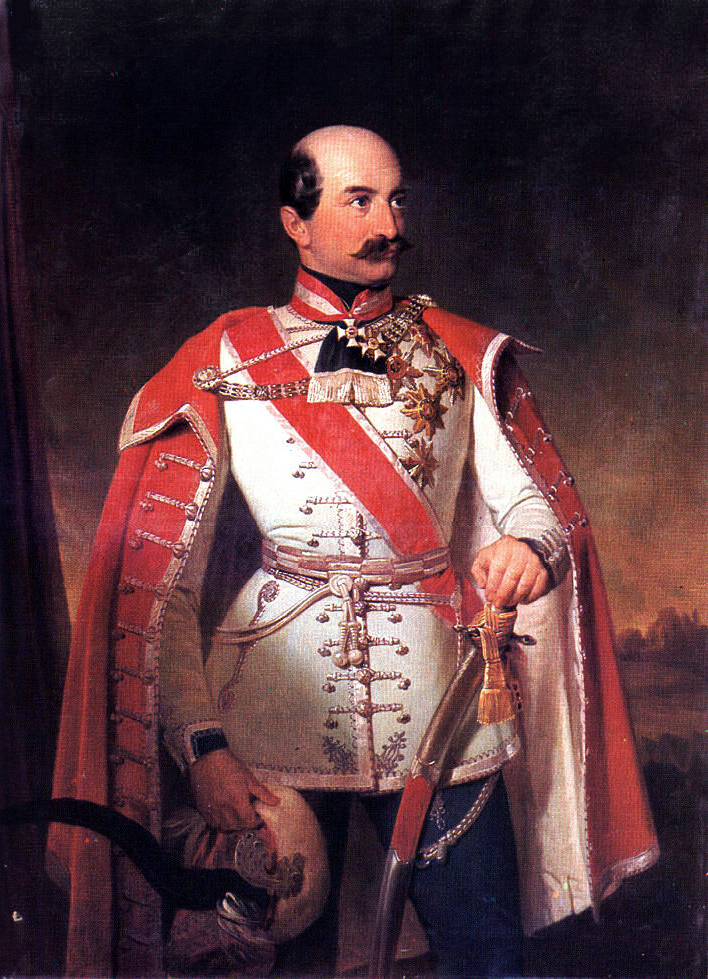
Ban Jelačić
Ivan Zasche
19th century

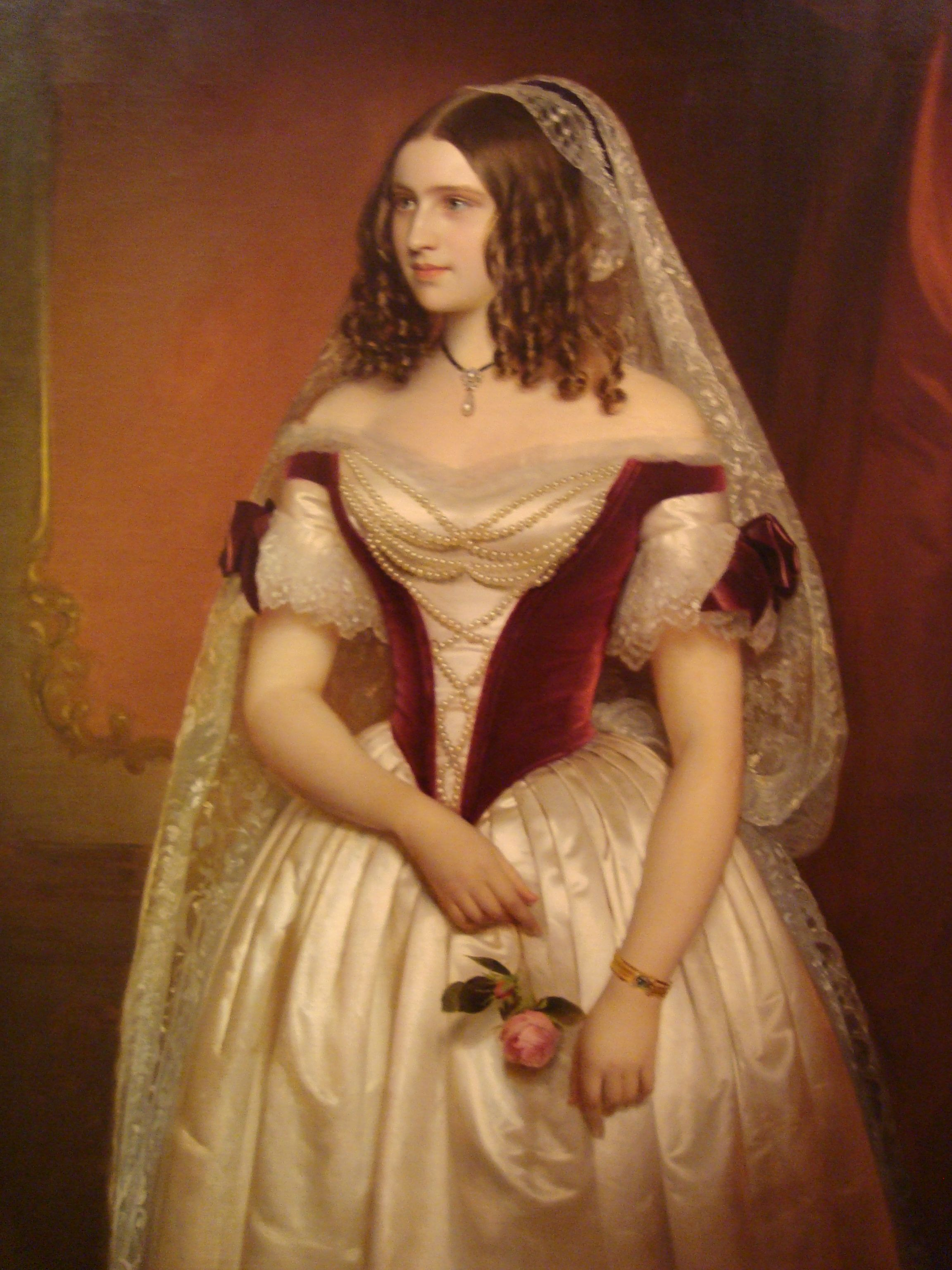
Sophie von Stockau, Unidentified painter, 19th century

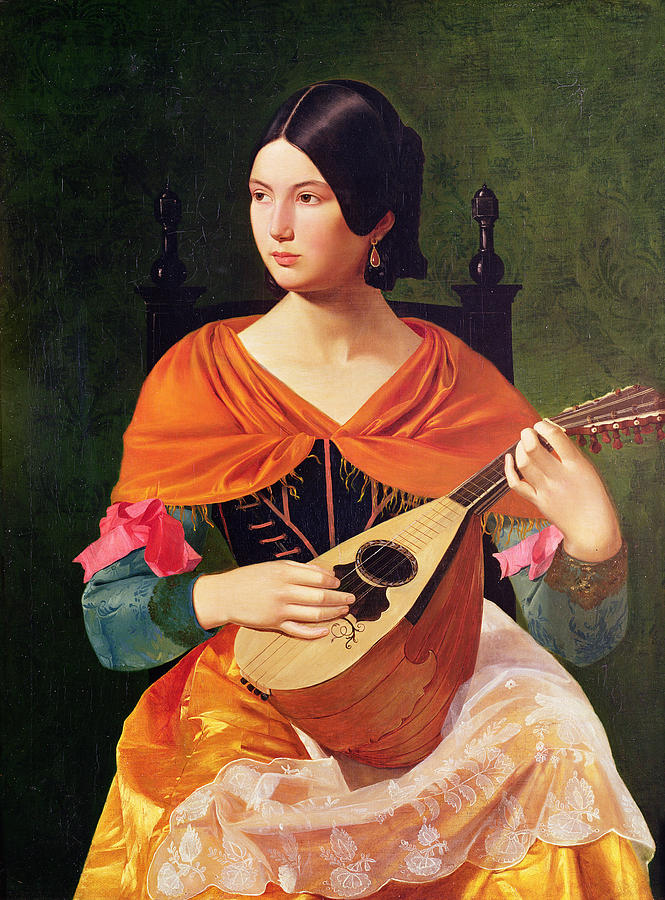
Roman woman playing a mandolin
Vjekoslav Karas
(1845-1847)

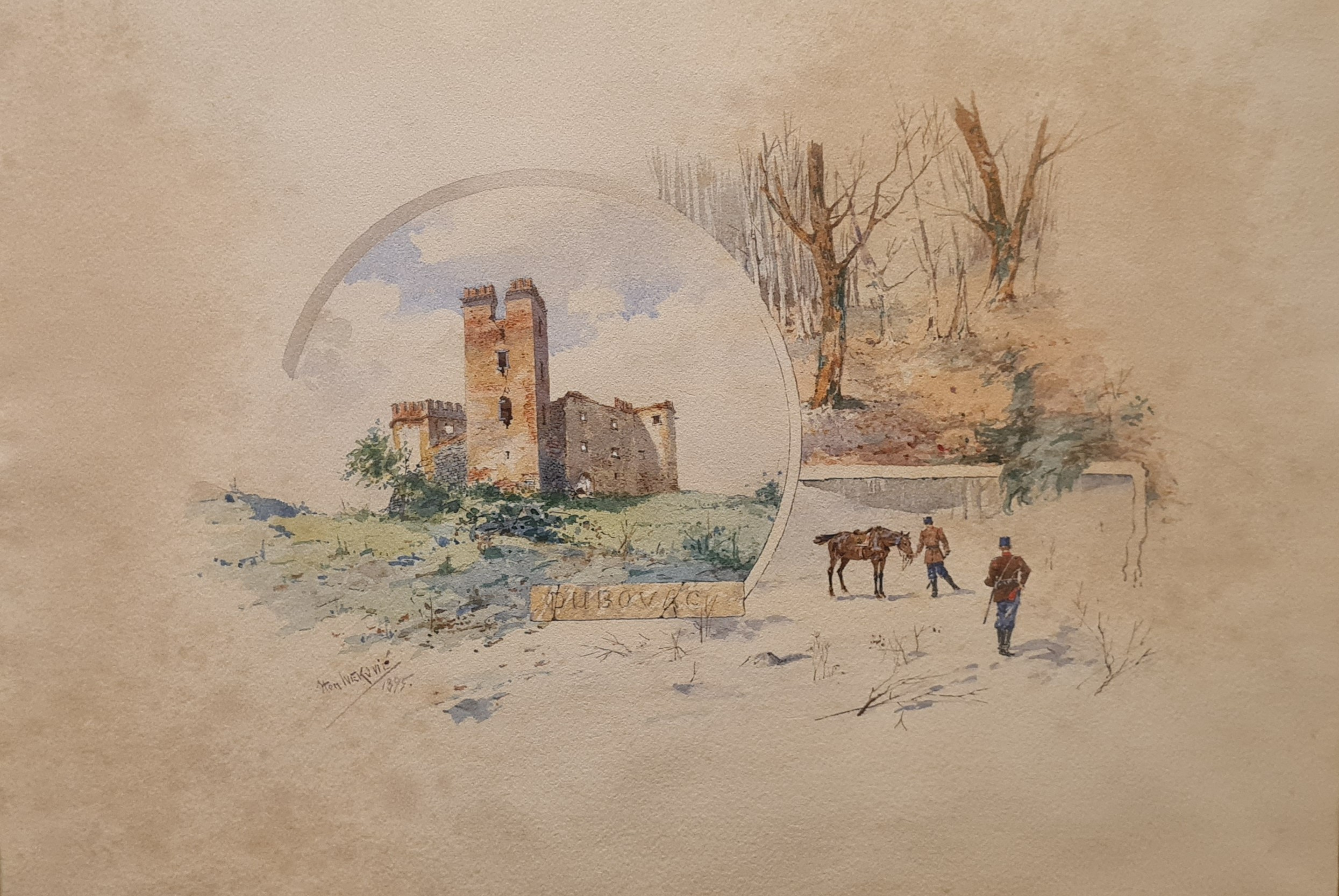
Dubovac by Oton Iveković, 1895

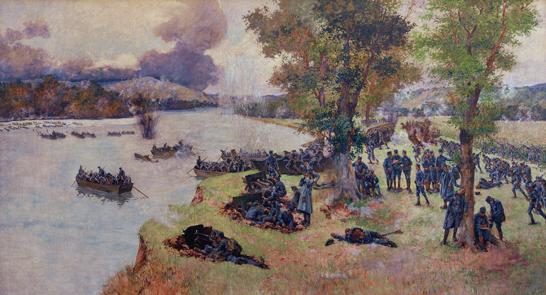
Prijelaz Drine kod Batara by Oton Iveković, (1914-1918)

== See also ==
- List of museums in Croatia
