= Trbušnjak =

Hill in Croatia

Coordinates: 44°59′11″N 14°54′12″E

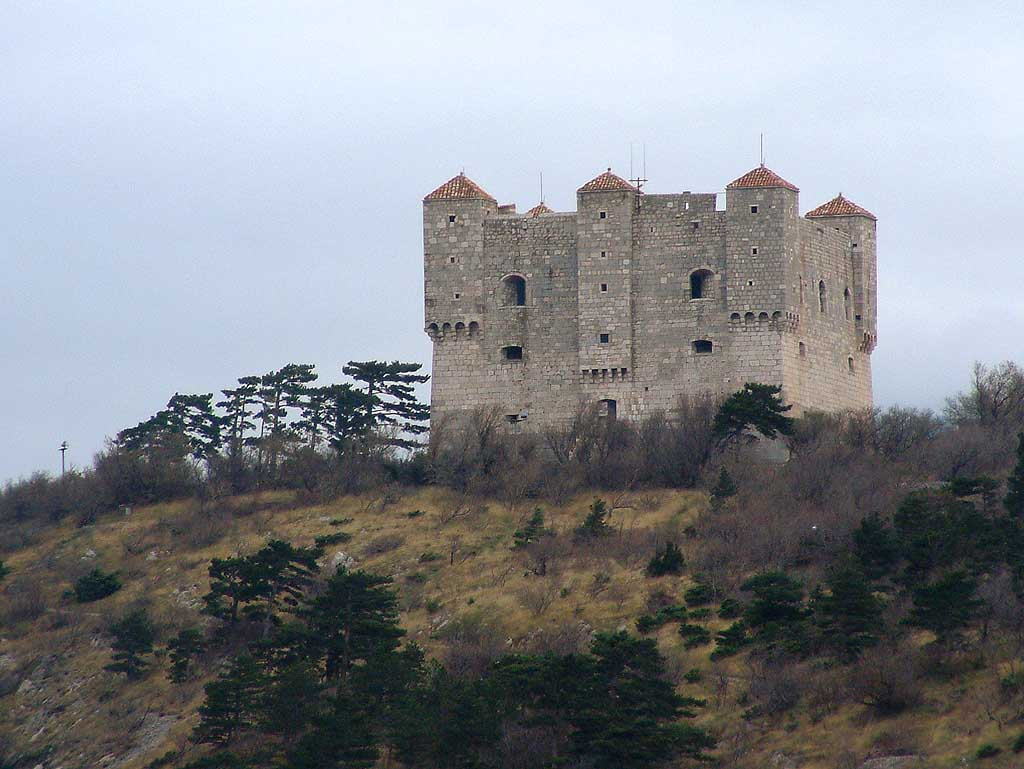
Fortress Nehaj, on the hill Nehaj, is the symbol of the town of Senj.

Trbušnjak (also: Nehaj [nɛxaj]) is the name of the 62 m high hill that is found above the center of the town of Senj in Croatia. More famous is the Nehaj Fortress that stands on top of the hill.

The name Nehaj comes from the Croatian term Ne hajati [nɛ xajati] which means Don't care.

This name was given to the hill and the Fortress by the Uskoks, who built on the top of this hill the Fortress Nehaj for defensive purposes. They gave the hill and the Fortress such a name because they wanted to emphasize to the citizens of Senj, and to all of those who lived in the vicinity of the town, that they should not concern themselves with the security of the fortress, because it shall not fall as long as the Uskoks are there.

This became true, because as long as the Uskoks were upon the hill, not one aggressor succeeded to conquer the hill or the Fortress, which at the same time meant great security for the town of Senj, which is located at the foot of the hill. To the builders of this Fortress, the only and main goal was the defence of the town and the obstruction of the Venetians and the Turks in their invasions and conquests.

But, shortly after the Fortress was built on the top of the hill, a truce was made between the Habsburg monarchy and the Republic of Venice, and one of the conditions of the truce was the transmigration of the Uskoks from the Fortress Nehaj and from Senj because of the constant fear that they gave the Venetians and the Turks. This act meant the disappearance of the Uskoks from the historical stage, and the exposure of these parts to constant conquests and plundering raids of the Turks and the Venetians.

== Climate ==
Climate data for Senj
Month	Jan	Feb	Mar	Apr	May	Jun	Jul	Aug	Sep	Oct	Nov	Dec	Year
Mean daily maximum °C (°F)	8 (46)	9 (48)	13 (55)	17 (62)	22 (71)	26 (79)	29 (84)	29 (84)	24 (76)	19 (66)	14 (58)	8 (47)	18 (65)
Mean daily minimum °C (°F)	3 (37)	3 (37)	6 (43)	9 (49)	13 (56)	18 (64)	20 (68)	19 (67)	17 (62)	12 (54)	9 (48)	3 (38)	11 (52)
Average precipitation mm (inches)	81 (3.2)	71 (2.8)	94 (3.7)	100 (4.1)	100 (4.1)	99 (3.9)	66 (2.6)	84 (3.3)	140 (5.5)	200 (7.8)	170 (6.8)	140 (5.5)	1,350 (53.3)
Source: Weatherbase

== See also ==
- Uskoks
- Fortress Nehaj
