= Vojković palace, Zagreb =

Vojković Palace
- Palača Vojković
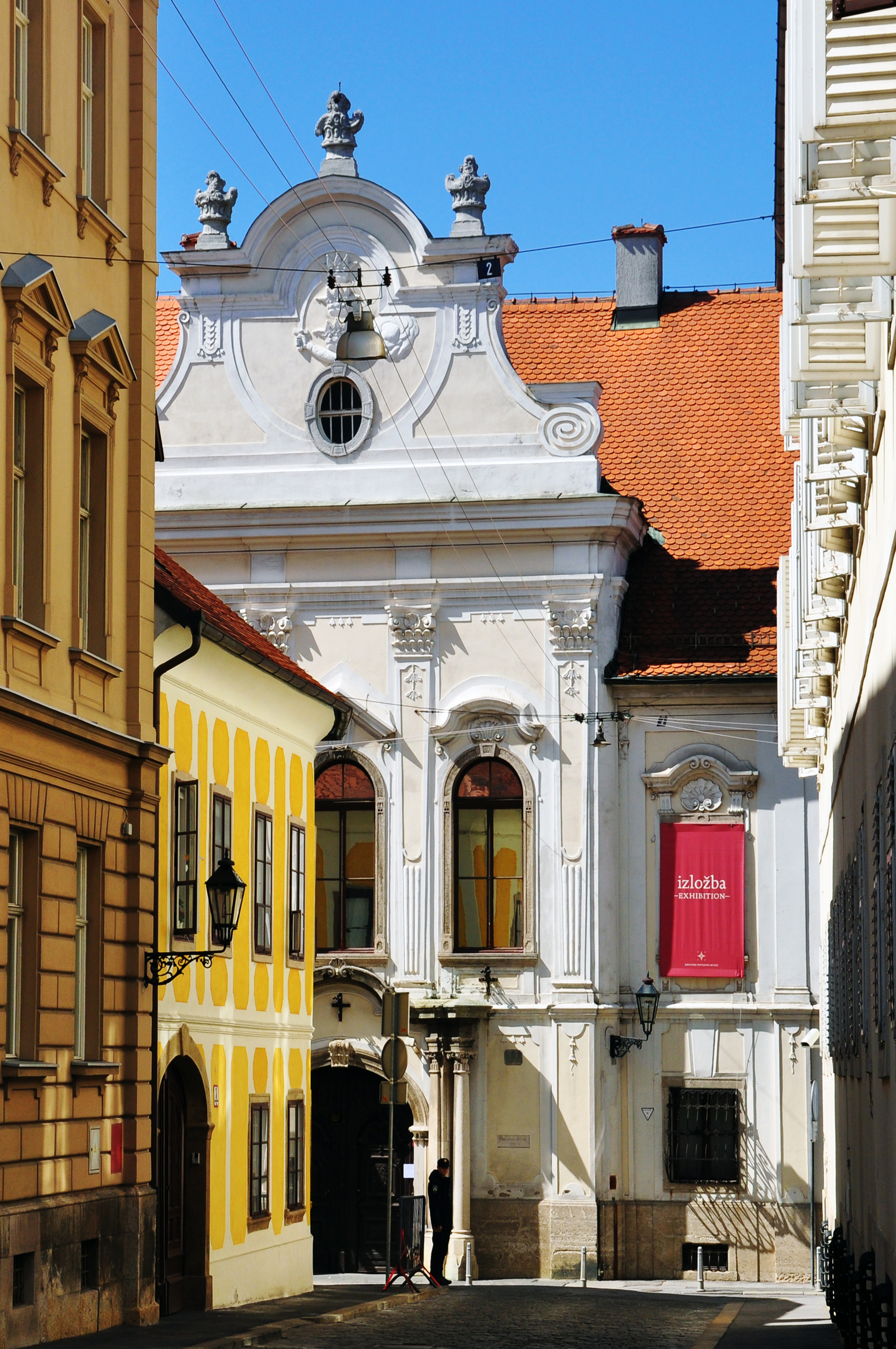
- Vojković palace as viewed from Josip Freudenreich street
- Interactive map of the Vojković Palace area

General information
- Architectural style: Late Baroque
- Location: Zagreb, Croatia
- Coordinates: 45°48′58″N 15°58′20″E
- Completed: 1764
- Client: Sigismund Vojković

Cultural Good of Croatia
- Reference no.: Z-188

Vojković palace (Croatian: Palača Vojković), alternatively the Vojković-Oršić-Rauch palace, is a three-winged Late Baroque palace in Zagreb's Upper Town. It was built in 1764 for Lieutenant Colonel of the cavalry at Banska Krajina (Border), Sigismund Vojković (Vojkffy). It changed ownership multiple times throughout history, and today it houses the Croatian History Museum.

== History ==
Prior to its construction, the area was occupied by two houses, one owned by a surgeon, the other by the noble Ilijašić. Both of these building were sold to the noble Sigismund Vojković (Vojkffy) who began building his own palace. For this purpose, he enlisted the services of a municipal brickwork located in today's Trešnjevka, "to build a very large house to be a fitting decoration and pride of the city, for which many hundreds of thousands of bricks are needed", and he undertook to purchase wood for making the bricks from the city municipality. The architect remains unknown to this day.

In 1787, it was used as a venue for theatre plays and dances, being a gathering place for Zagreb's high society and nobility. However, the palace proved expensive to maintain, and it was sold in 1806 to Adam Oršić. It eventually changed ownership to Ferdinand Kulmer, and then to Levin Rauch, after which it was bought by the city to house the mayor's office, and in 1959, it was given to the Croatian History Museum.

== Description ==
The architecture is described as being influenced by Viennese and Styrian Baroque. It is a three winged, two-story palace, with an elevated risalit exceeding the highest point of the roof and of rich decoration and plasticity.

It has a monumental staircase, which connects the main hall with the entrance hall. The room decorations date from the time when it was owned by Rauch.
