= Ivan Lenković =

Habsburg Croatian army general (died 1569)

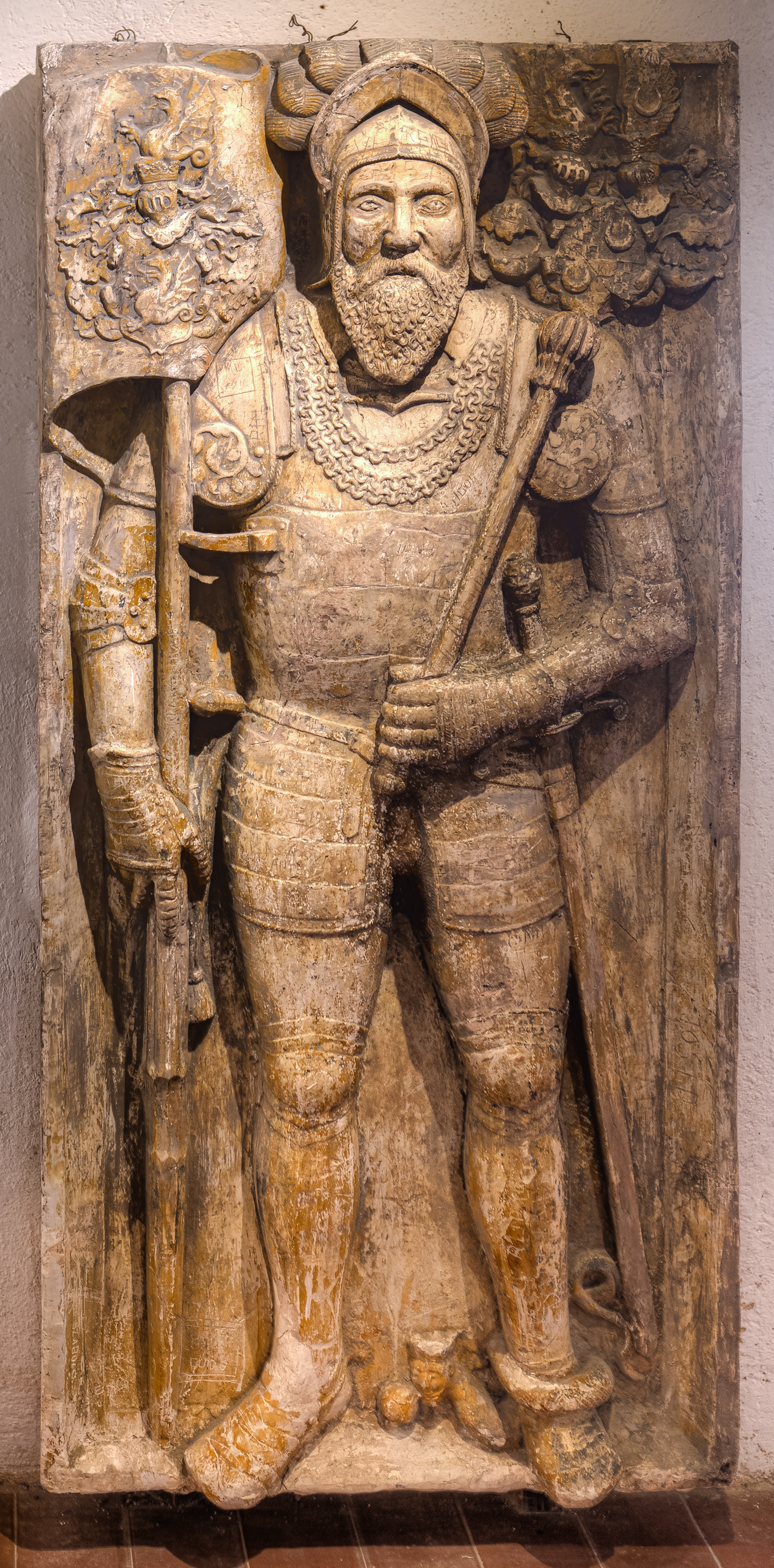
Cast of the tombstone of Ivan Lenković

Ivan Lenković (died 22 June 1569) was a Habsburg Croatian army general and the leader of the Uskoks. He carried the title of baron. He is noted for the construction of Nehaj Fortress and as a captain of the Senj area. He also contributed in organizing the Military Frontier.

During the Ottoman wars in Europe, Klis Fortress was on 7 April 1569, liberated by Split noblemen Ivan Alberti and Nikola Cindro. Bey Mustafa responded by bringing under Klis Fortress more than 10,000 soldiers. General Ivan Lenković with 1,000 Uskoks came in relief, to some 1500 Klis defenders. During the battle, Lenković withdrew, after he himself was wounded, and the fortress was delivered to the Turks, on 31 May. However, this temporary relief resounded in Europe and among the local population. He died in Metlika on 22 June 1569 and is buried in Novo Mesto Franciscan Church.

== See also ==
- Petar Kružić
