= Giovanni Rotondo =

English composer

Giovanni Rotondo is a London-based composer. He has composed music for feature films, documentaries and TV series, including the Netflix show Dark Desire.

== Education ==
Rotondo completed his bachelor's degree in music composition at Berklee College of Music in Boston.

== Career ==
After completing his bachelor, he spent a year in Los Angeles. During this time, he allegedly worked on Spider-man 3 (uncredited), and the Irish drama film Calvary. He also collaborated on the score of The Ramen Girl, and Illegal Tender.

He created and managed the Film Scoring Lab at Centro Sperimentale di Cinematografia. After scoring the feature film Bologna 2 Agosto I Giorni Della Collera, he composed the music for Orphans & Kingdoms, a 2014 New Zealand drama. He composed themes for Elijah and the Rock Creature, a 2018 Canadian movie. Other TV projects he composed for include: Il Giudice Meschino*, Il Confine, Dark Desire, and The Nightriders.

== Music composition for video games ==
1. The 8-bit Time Machine
2. Zotrix

== Awards ==
Rotondo has been nominated and the won following awards.

- Global Music Award: Silver Medal for Orphans & Kingdoms, original soundtrack film
- Global Music Award 2018: for Elijah and the Rock Creature, original score
- International Sound & Film Music Festival nominated for Il Confine
- Global Music Award in 2013
- Jerry Goldsmith Awards in 2014
