= Uskoks =

Irregular soldiers in Habsburg Croatia

- Uskoci
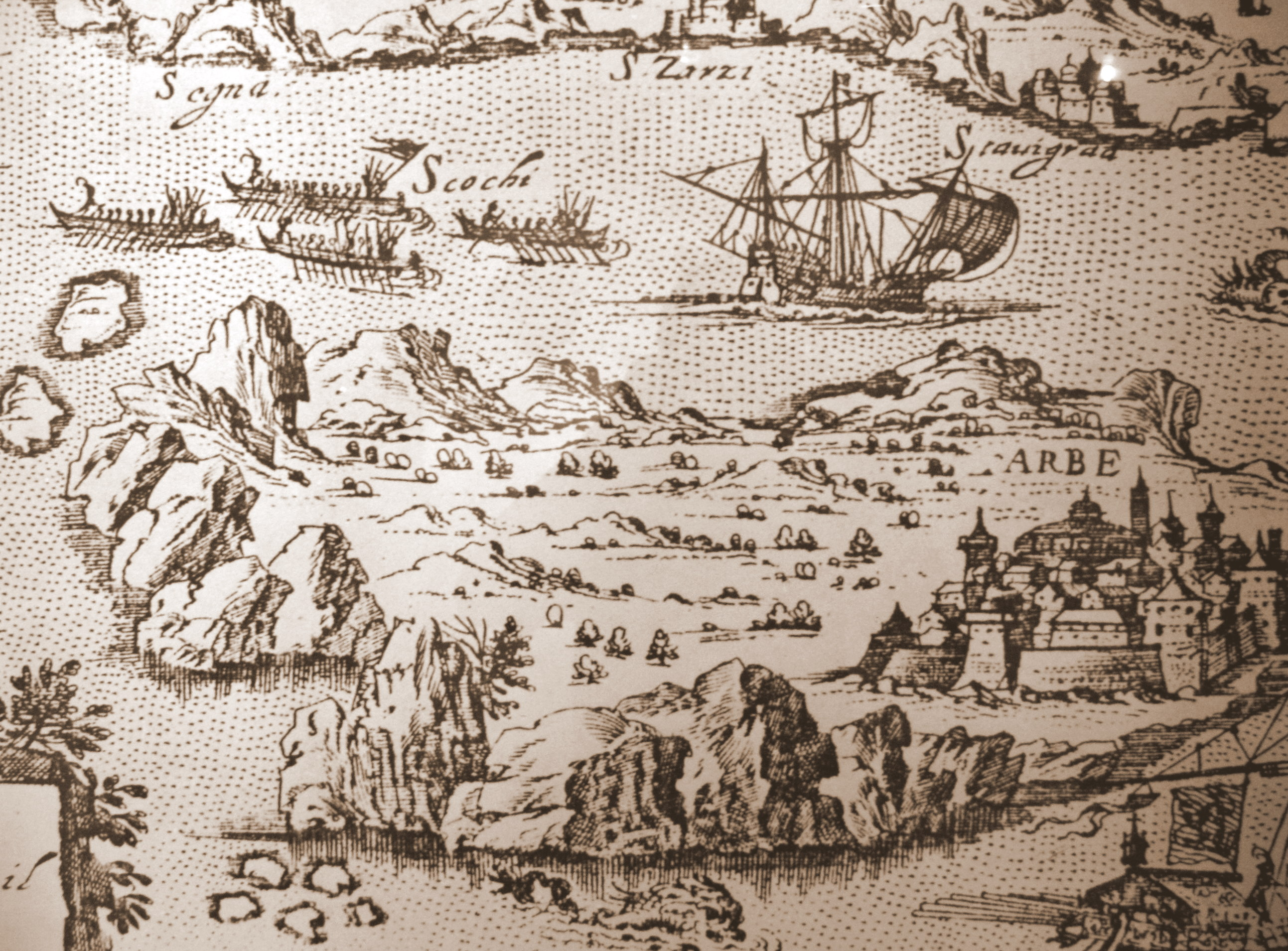
- Stitch with Uskok-ships chasing a large ship. Museum of Fortress Nehaj in Senj, Croatia.
- Leaders: Numerous; notable leaders include: Petar Kružić (Klis); Ivan Lenković (Senj)
- Dates active: 1520s–1618
- Headquarters: Mobile, two most famous: Klis Fortress in Klis (origin); Nehaj Fortress in Senj (later)
- Active regions: Habsburg–Ottoman frontiers
- Size: 2,000 at most
- Part of: Various / Undetermined: Croatian Habsburg soldiers; Military Frontier soldiers; Piracy, irregular army
- Wars: the Ottoman–Habsburg wars

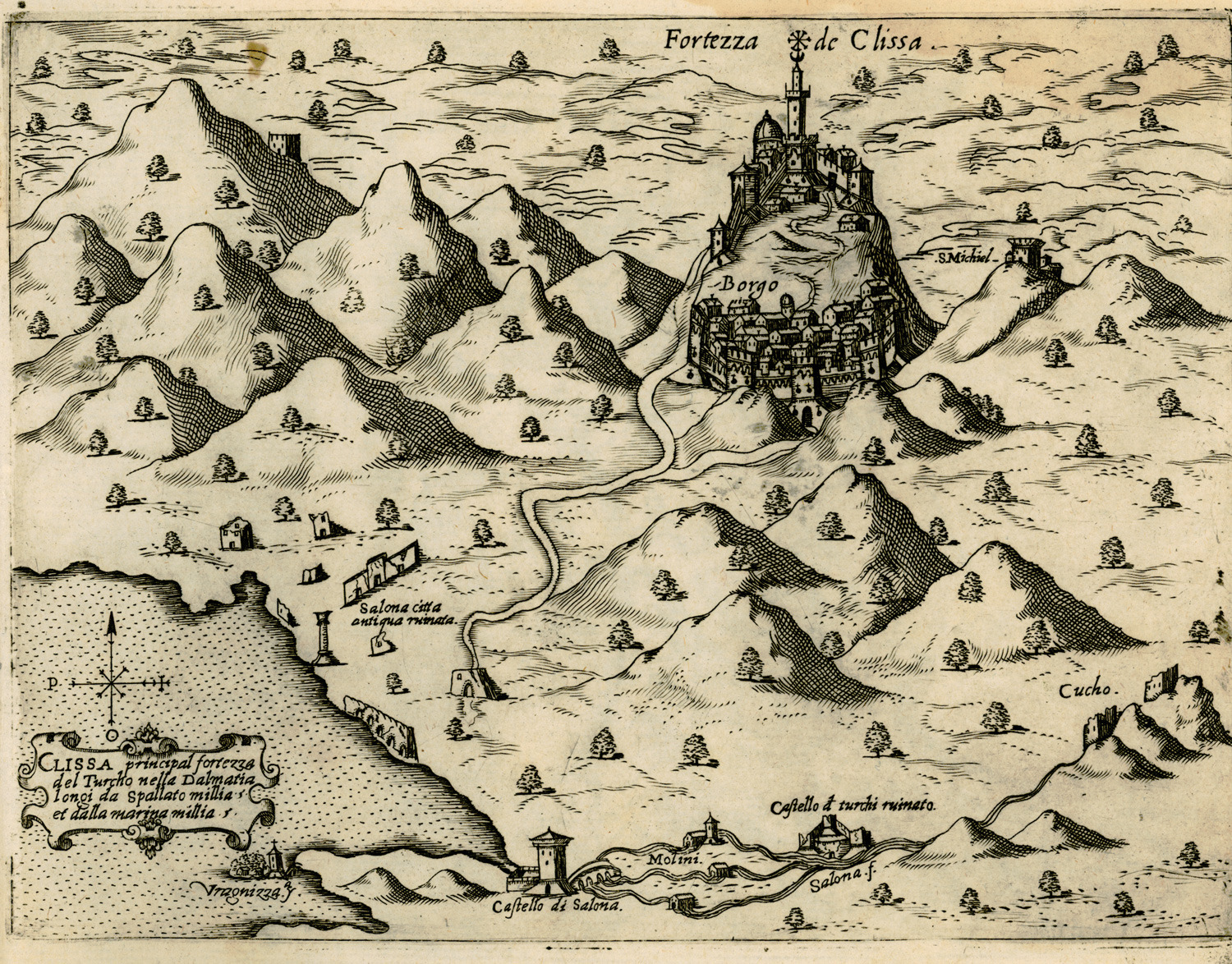
During this defense of the Klis Fortress against an Ottoman invasion, an elite Croatian military faction of Uskoci was formed.

The Uskoks (Croatian: Uskoci, pronounced [ǔsko̞t͡si], singular: Uskok; notes on naming) were irregular soldiers in Habsburg Croatia that inhabited areas on the eastern Adriatic coast and surrounding territories during the Ottoman wars in Europe. Bands of Uskoks fought a guerrilla war against the Ottomans, and they formed small units and rowed swift boats. Since the Uskoks were checked on land and were rarely paid their annual subsidy, they resorted to acts of piracy.

The exploits of the Uskoks contributed to a renewal of war between Venice and the Ottoman Empire (1570–1573). An extremely curious picture of contemporary manners is presented by the Venetian agents, whose reports on this war resemble a knightly chronicle of the Middle Ages. These chronicles contain information pertaining to single combats, tournaments and other chivalrous adventures.

Many of these troops served abroad. After a series of incidents that escalated into the Uskok War (1615–1618), the Uskok activity in their stronghold of Senj mostly ceased and were disbanded, but the usage of the term and their existence although more localized continued for a period of time.

== Name ==
Etymologically, the word uskoci itself means 'the ones who jumped in' or 'the ones who ambushed' in South Slavic languages. The Serbian Cyrillic transliteration is Ускоци, and Slovene is Uskoki. In other languages, the term became a loanword as well — German: Uskoken, Hungarian: Uszkókok, Italian: Uscocchi.

== History ==
=== Early period ===
The Ottoman conquest of Bosnia and Herzegovina during the early years of the 16th century drove large numbers of ethnic Croats from their homes, which in the town of Klis prompted the formation of the Uskok military. Large numbers of fugitives from Herzegovina, Dalmatia, and Bosnia fleeing the Ottomans, joined the ranks of the Uskok bands. In 1522 the border territory of Senj was taken over by the Habsburgs under the authority of Archduke Ferdinand, forming a state-controlled Militärgrenze, or Military Frontier. The Austrian Emperor Ferdinand I instituted a system of planting colonies of defenders along the Military Frontier. Moreover, the Uskoks were promised an annual subsidy in return for their services. Owing to its location, Klis Fortress was an important defensive position which stands on the route by which the Ottomans could penetrate the mountain barrier separating the coastal lowlands from around Split in Croatia, from Ottoman-held Bosnia. Numerous refugees from Ottoman areas began settling along this territory, crossing the border to escape Ottoman attacks. Christian guerilla resistance in Ottoman-occupied areas of Dalmatia and Bosnia caused these people to flee and settle down, first at the fortress of Klis along the Military Frontier, then at Senj. A body of these "uskoks" led by Croatian captain Petar Kružić used the base at Klis both to hold the Turks at bay, and to engage in marauding and piracy against coastal shipping. Although nominally accepting the sovereignty of the Habsburg Emperor Ferdinand I, (Note: In 1527, the Croatian nobles elected Ferdinand I, Archduke of Austria as their king, and confirmed the succession to him and his heirs. In return for the throne Archduke Ferdinand promised to respect the historic rights, freedoms, laws and customs the Croats had when united with the Hungarian kingdom and to defend Croatia from Ottoman invasion. (R. W. SETON -WATSON:The southern Slav question and the Habsburg Monarchy page 18)) who obtained the Croatian crown in 1527, Kružić and his freebooting Uskoks were a law unto themselves.

After Petar Kružić's death, and the lack of water supply, the defenders of Klis finally surrendered to the Ottomans in exchange for their freedom. On March 12, 1537, the town and fortress was given up to the Ottomans, many of the citizens left the town while the Uskoks went to the city of Senj on the Adriatic coast, where they continued fighting the Ottomans. They may have started to gather around Senj as early as 1520. The Ottoman raids and destruction brought Senj natives together with those from the Habsburg lands, Dalmatians, Ragusans and Italians. At Senj, the Klis Uskoks were soon joined by other refugees from Novi Vinodolski in northwestern Croatia, from Otočac on the Gacka River, and from other Croatian towns and villages.

The new Uskok stronghold, screened by mountains and forests, was unassailable by cavalry or artillery. However, the fortress was admirably suitable to the lightly armed uskoks who were excellent in guerrilla warfare. The Martolos were employed by the Ottomans to discourage Uskok penetration of Turkish territory, which was not very profitable anyhow. Since the uskoks were checked on land and were rarely paid their annual subsidy, they resorted to acts of piracy. Large galleys could not anchor in the bay of Senj, which is shallow and exposed to sudden gales. So, the uskoks fitted out a fleet of swift boats, which were light enough to navigate the smallest creeks and inlets of the shores of Illyria. Moreover, these boats were helpful in providing the uskoks a temporary landing on shore. With these they were able to attack numerous commercial areas on the Adriatic. The uskoks saw their ranks swell as outlaws from all nations joined them. Eventually, the whole city of Senj lived from piracy. The expeditions were blessed in the local church and the monasteries of the Dominicans and the Franciscans received tithes from the loot.

After the War of the Holy League in 1537 against the Ottoman Empire, a truce between Venice and the Ottomans was created in 1539. This led to the evacuation of all Uskoks in Dalmatia in 1541 where they had been defending a Christian enclave in the mountains during the war. Throughout the following years the Habsburgs were at arms with the Turks, giving the Uskoks the opportunity to repeatedly raid Bosnia and Dalmatia. The Uskoks were able to continue doing so up until 1547 when peace was established between the two, forcing the Uskoks to find other ways of making ends meet. As with other Slavic pirates, the Uskok territory was not suitable for any form of agriculture, forcing them to turn to piracy once more.

=== Ottoman invasion and Venice ===
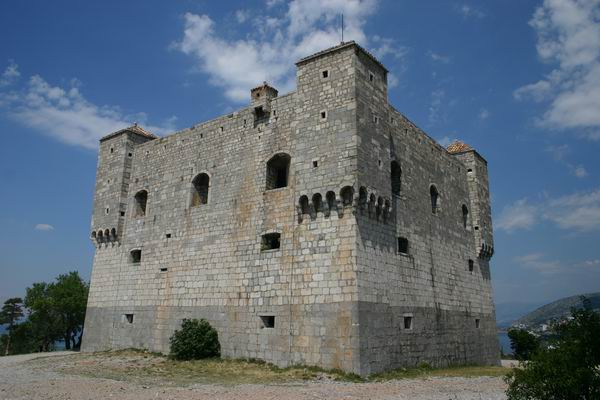
Nehaj Fortress in Senj, built by Ivan Lenković in 1558.

Beginning as inland pirates, the Uskoci shortly turned to the seas once realizing the full potential of the geography of Senj. The land was protected by thick forests and mountains while the jagged cliffs near the seas prevented warships from entering. The seas in the Gulf of Quarnero were quite rough, which posed navigational hazards as further protection from their enemies. Uskoks began their attacks upon Turkish ships with boats large enough to hold thirty to fifty men.

After 1540, however, Venice, as mistress of the seas, guaranteed the safety of Ottoman merchant vessels, and provided them with an escort of galleys. The uskoks retaliated by ravaging the Venetian islands of Krk, Rab and Pag. Moreover, they utilized the Venetian territories in Dalmatia as a springboard in order to launch attacks against the Ottomans.

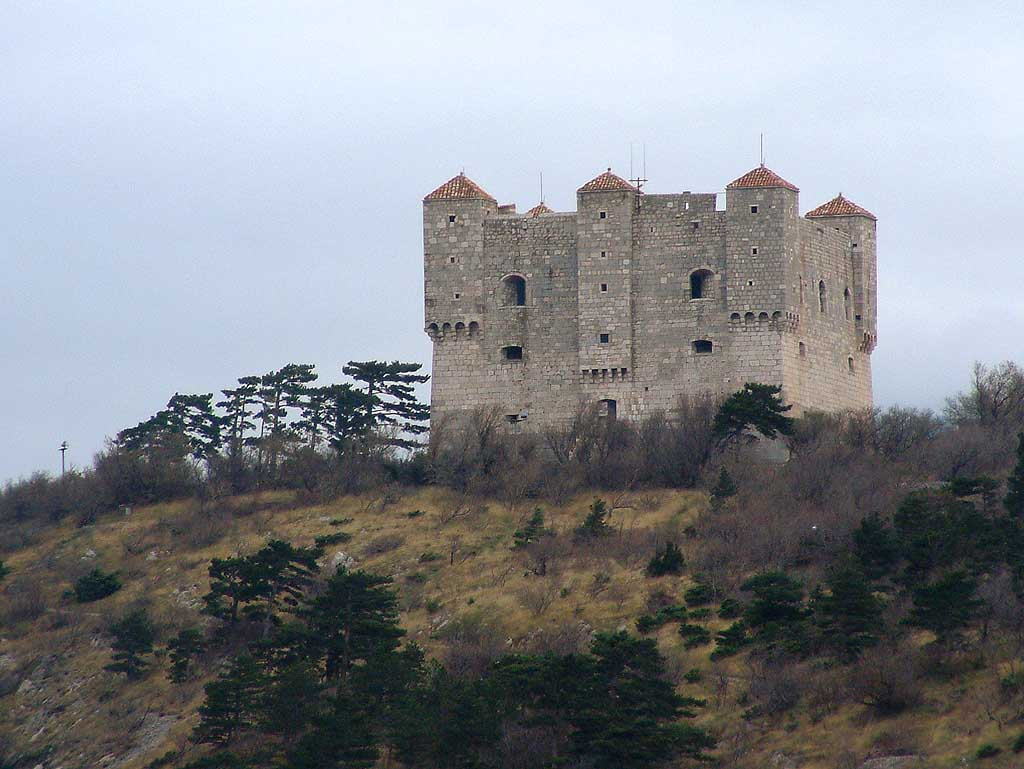
Another view of Nehaj in Senj

After 1561 the Uskoci attacked Christian shipping in Dubrovnik with numbers never exceeding 2000 men. By 1573 the Uskoks caused considerable concern in Venice with frequent attacks once Venetian attempts of protection had proven to be ineffective. The following years led the reputation of the Uskoks to spread, becoming the resort of refugees and outlaws of all kinds from all nations.

Meanwhile, the corsairs of Greece and North Africa were free to raid the unprotected southern shores of Italy. Venice was besieged with complaints from the Porte, the Vatican, and the Viceroy of Naples with his sovereign, the King of Spain. A Venetian appeal to Austria for help met with little success, and the offenses of the uskoks against the Venetians were outweighed by their attacks against the Ottomans. Minuccio Minucci, a Venetian envoy at Graz, states that a share of the uskoks' spoils of silk, velvet and jewels, went to the ladies of the Archducal Court of Graz, where important matters between Venice and Austria were negotiated.

From 1577 onwards, Venice endeavored to crush the pirates without offending Austria, enlisting Albanians in place of their Dalmatian crews, who feared reprisals at home. For a time the uskoks only ventured forth at night, during the winter season and even during stormy weather.

In 1592, following the fall of Bihać, a strong Ottoman army invaded further into Croatia hoping to capture Senj. Led by Telli Hasan Pasha, the beylerbey of Bosnia, the Ottomans managed to capture a number of uskok settlements, killing and enslaving the population. However, the army was routed and dispersed in the following year. Austria was involved in war with the Ottomans and the Venetian admiral Giovanni Bembo blockaded Trieste and Rijeka (Fiume), where the pirates forwarded their booty for sale. They also erected two forts to command the passages from Senj to the open sea. In 1600, the Prince of Senj was Mickael Radic. The Duke Micheal Radic, appointed as Prince of Senj on 1 December 1600 by King Rudolf in Graz. Prince Radic was Prince of Senj. Radic family is a Native noble family from Lika region; members of the family were Uskok military leaders at the headquarters in Senj.

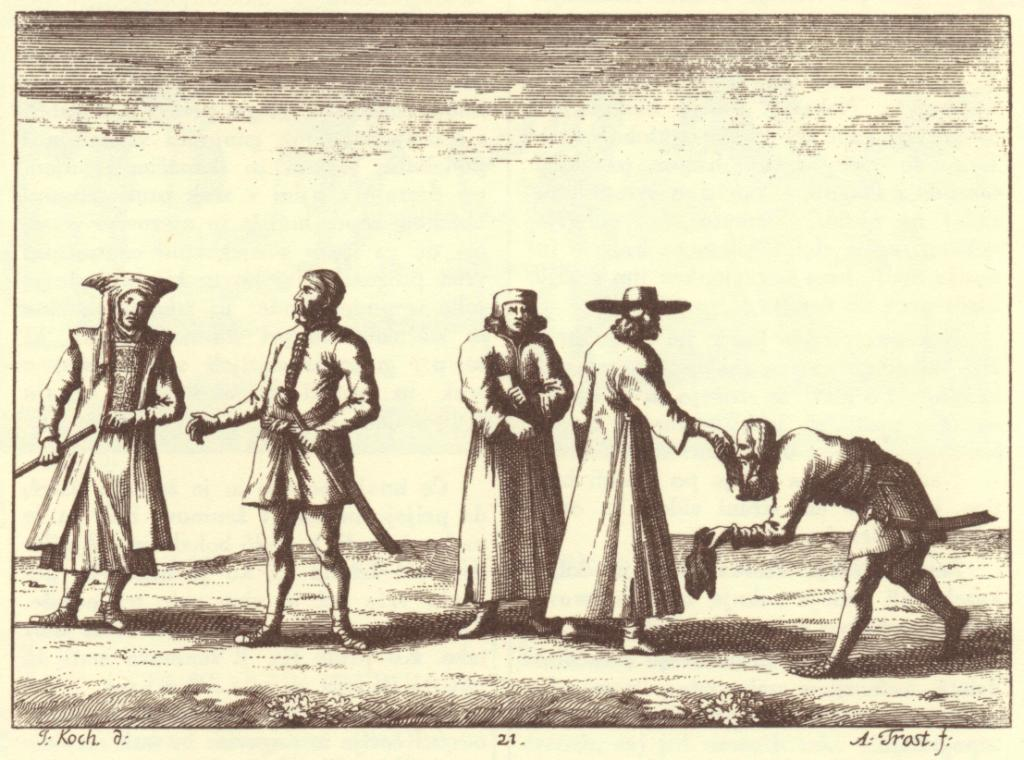
Carniolan Uskoks in an engraving from Johann Weikhard von Valvasor's work The Glory of the Duchy of Carniola, 17th century.

A raid by the Uskoks upon Istria resulted in an agreement between Venice and Austria, and Count Joseph of Rabatta was appointed to act as commissioner to those in Senj as well as the chief negotiator with the Venetians. Rabatta came to Senj in 1600 with a strong bodyguard detail, and was very energetic. His time ruling over the Uskoks was brutal where many Uskoks were hung or sent to fight in the Turkish war, revealing his favor towards the Venetian side. He soon lost all military support, giving the Uskoks the opportunity to overthrow his rule and was ultimately killed in January 1602, enabling Senj to return to its usual state, with the fugitive Uskoks returning to Senj where they resumed their acts of piracy.

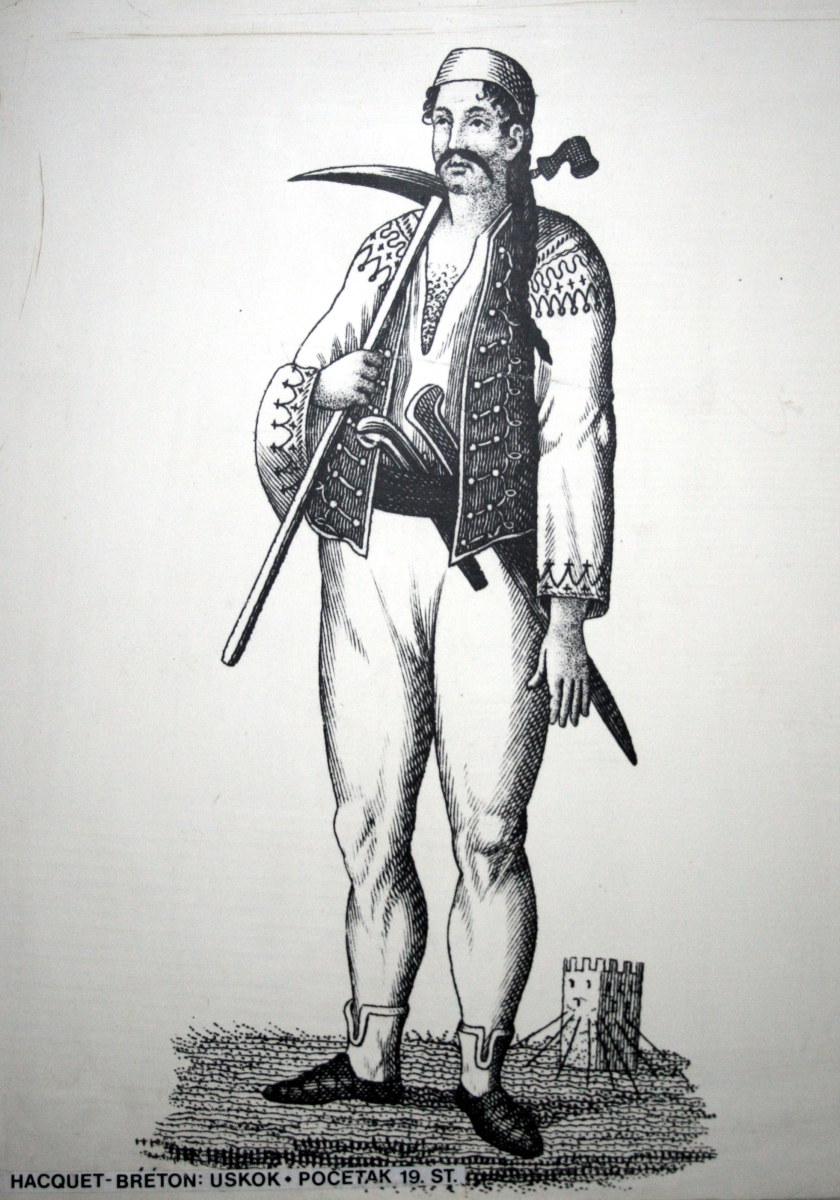
An uskok drawing from the 19th century, from the Museum of the City of Zagreb

Up until 1611 the Uskoks were relatively undisturbed. Piracy was strictly forbidden at this point but it was tolerated in order to avoid payment of subsidies owed to those of Senj. A Venetian squadron intercepted an Uskok fleet in the spring of 1613 in response to the complaints regarding Uskok activity and, as reported, sixty Uskoks were beheaded with their heads then displayed in St. Mark's Square. In response to this offense the Uskok captured a galley of Venetians, slaughtered the crew, and used the blood of the victims to flavor their bread.

The uskoks would conduct such acts up until 1615 when their piracy went so far as creating an open war between Venice and Austria. Venice, frustrated with the piracy, launched an attack after the Archduke Ferdinand of Styria refused to reprimand the Uskoks. A peace treaty was signed in autumn 1617 which arranged for the Uskoks to be disbanded, as well as their ships and fortresses be destroyed. An agreement between the Habsburgs and Venetians in 1618 expelled the Uskoks from Senj, prompting migrations of Uskok families into the hinterland.

== Uskok migrations ==
The pirates and their families were, accordingly, transported to the interior, where they gave their name to the "Uskoken Gebirge", a group of mountains on the borders of Carniola now called Žumberak. They were also settled in the nearby White Carniola and Kostel in what is now Slovenia. Their presence has also been traced near Učka in Istria, where such significant family names as Novlian (from Novi Vinodolski), Ottocian (from Otočac) and Clissan (from Klis, older orthography), were noted by Italian historian Carlo de Franceschi in 1879.

== Origin of Uskoks from Senj ==
Determining the exact national or ethnic composition of the Uskoks from Senj is extremely difficult since the nationality of Uskoks was rarely recorded; the most commonly used terms for Uskoks are "Croats", "Slavs", "Morlachs". Venetian and Habsburg sources described Uskoks as Croats. The observers and fellow Uskoks used terms of national and ethnic identity as a way to describe the origin of Uskoks. They used the terms Croat, Slav and Morlach to connect the Uskoks with the rest population of the islands, the coast and the hinterland, but also to show differences between those Uskoks which belonged to other nationalities, e.g., Vlachs, Italians, Albanians, Germans and others. The Venetian Republic at the end of the 16th century was concerned about the excellent relations between the Venetian Dalmatian peoples and Uskoks. According to them such relationships existed because of belonging to the same people. There were many Albanians among Uskoks as well and many islanders from Krk, Pag, Rab and residents of other Dalmatian islands. All Uskoks were Catholics, while newcomers to Senj Orthodox or Muslims immediately became Catholics. Uskoks married women from the Senj area and much less often from the areas of Venetian and Turkish Dalmatia The arrival and occurrence of the Uskoks cannot be identified with the migration of the Vlachs.

== Uskok Code ==
As a group whose central reason for being brought together was Christianity, the Uskoks' explanation for piracy and warfare rested in their religion. These people felt they were fighting a holy war against the Muslim enemy in defense of the boundaries of Christendom. Seeing that these people were once refugees from Ottoman nations, they were given no choice but to leave in order to continue following the religion they had been their entire lives. The Uskok people established a code to follow, holding Senj honor and its values in a central place of that code. Honor is what they believed to be the most important quality that a hero could have, which all Uskoks strived to be. Other important aspects of the Uskok heroic honor were loyalty to their city, army, and band; honorable attention to every knight and obligation; readiness to lay down their lives or spill their blood in time of war; experience in warfare; ability to benefit their city; success and glory in duels with the Turks and other enemies of the Christian faith; and severity in punishing those who were disobedient or rebellious. It was also made known the Uskok qualities that would cancel out one's honor: reluctance to shed one's own blood; failure to engage the enemy in battle; groundless boasting; avoidance of risks on the frontier; failure to take prisoners, trophies, or booty; meanness in rewards to comrades or spies; the absence of any general recognition of one's manliness; and the lack of battle scars or wounds.

From these principles it is clear that the Uskoks admired the strength and arrogance of a hero and despised the weakness displayed by a coward. The importance of these principles was instilled in boys at a young age. Taught to take part in competitions, they would test their strength and dexterity through racing, fighting, and throwing stones at one another until blood ran. Over time, this code would be broken, ignored, and overlooked as the Uskok attitude and motives would change.

== Legacy ==
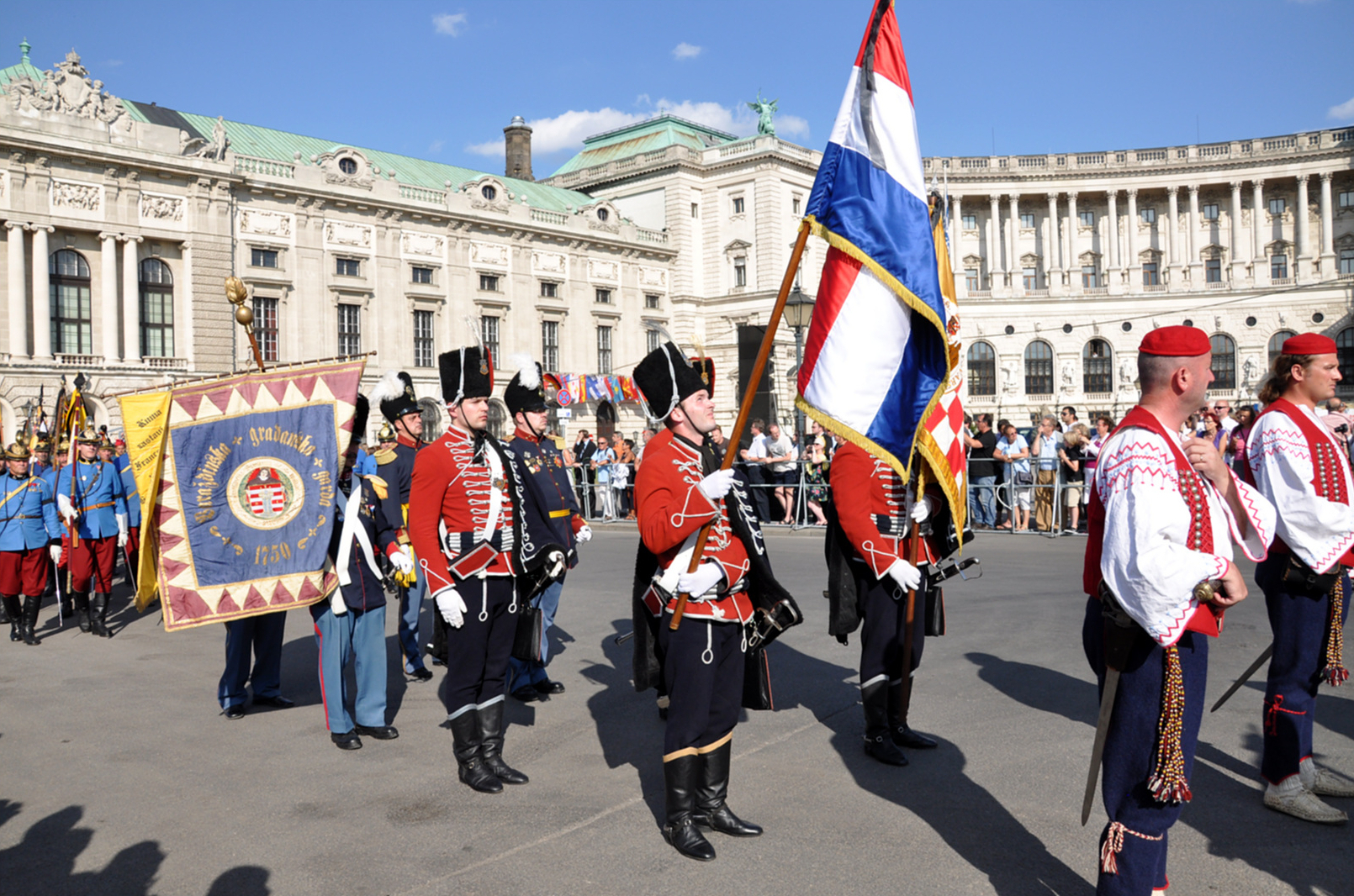
Kliški uskoci (front) at the funeral of Otto von Habsburg in Vienna

Today, a historical unit of uskoks called Kliški uskoci ("Uskoks of Klis" | "Historical Unit Kliški uskoci".) exists as a ceremonial regiment in honour of the national legacy of uskoks in Croatia. The unit of Klis Uskoks is founded by Croatian war veterans. After the Croatian War for Independence, the former soldiers wanted to revitalize the historical and cultural heritage of Klis, the town whose bloody history gave much inspiration during the war. The veterans participate in historical and cultural events to renew the memory of the Uskoks of Klis. They were among the six historic Croatian military units represented at the funeral of Otto von Habsburg in July 2011.

One Special Forces unit of Special Operations Command of Croatian Armed Forces is called Commando Uskok Company (Komando uskočka satnija).

USKOK is also the Croatian abbreviation for the Office for the Suppression of Corruption and Organised Crime. The Office is a special state attorney office specialised for the prosecution of corruption and organised crime. Its seat is in Zagreb and it is competent for the entire territory of the Republic of Croatia.

== Notable uskoci ==
- Bajo Pivljanin
- Petar Kružić
- Ivan Lenković
- Nikola Jurišić
- Petar Mrkonjić
- Ivo Senjanin

== See also ==
- Hajduk
- List of revolutions and rebellions
- List of rebellions in the Habsburg monarchy
- Morlachs

== Bibliography ==
- Bracewell, Catherine Wendy (1992). The Uskoks of Senj: Piracy, Banditry, and Holy War in the Sixteenth-Century Adriatic. Ithaca, NY: Cornell University Press. ISBN 978-0-801-42674-2.
- Council of Europe (2003). Parliamentary Assembly - Working papers - 2003 Ordinary Session January 2003 - Volume I - Documents 9519, 9568 & 9576-9639. Strasbourg: Council of Europe Publishing. ISBN 92-871-5135-0.
- Clissold, Von Stephen (1966). A short history of the Yugoslav peoples. Cambridge: Cambridge University Press. ISBN 0-521-04676-9.
- Davies, Norman (1996). Europe: a history. Oxford University Press. ISBN 9780198201717.
- Fine, John Van Antwerp (2006). When ethnicity did not matter in the Balkans. Michigan: The University of Michigan Press. ISBN 0-472-11414-X.
- Goffman, Daniel (2002). The Ottoman Empire and early modern Europe. Cambridge: Cambridge University Press. ISBN 0-521-45280-5.
- Lane, Frederic Chapin (1973). Venice, a maritime republic. Baltimore: Johns Hopkins University Press. ISBN 0-8018-1460-X.
- Listeš, Srećko (1998). Klis: prošlost, toponimi, govor (in Croatian). Klis: Hrvatsko društvo Trpimir. ISBN 9789539675132.
- Longworth, Philip (1979). "The Senj Oskoks Reconsidered". Slavonic and East European Review: 348–368.
- Rothenberg, Gunther E. (1961). "Venice and The Uskoks of Senj: 1537-1618". The Journal of Modern History. 33 (2): 148–156. doi:10.1086/238780. S2CID 144221514.
- Setton, Kenneth Meyer (1984). The Papacy and the Levant, 1204–1571: The Sixteenth Century, Vol. IV. Philadelphia: The American Philosophical Society. ISBN 0-87169-162-0.
- Singleton, Frederick Bernard (1989). A short history of the Yugoslav peoples. Cambridge: Cambridge University Press. ISBN 0-521-27485-0.
