= Nehaj Fortress =

- Tvrđava Nehaj (Croatian)
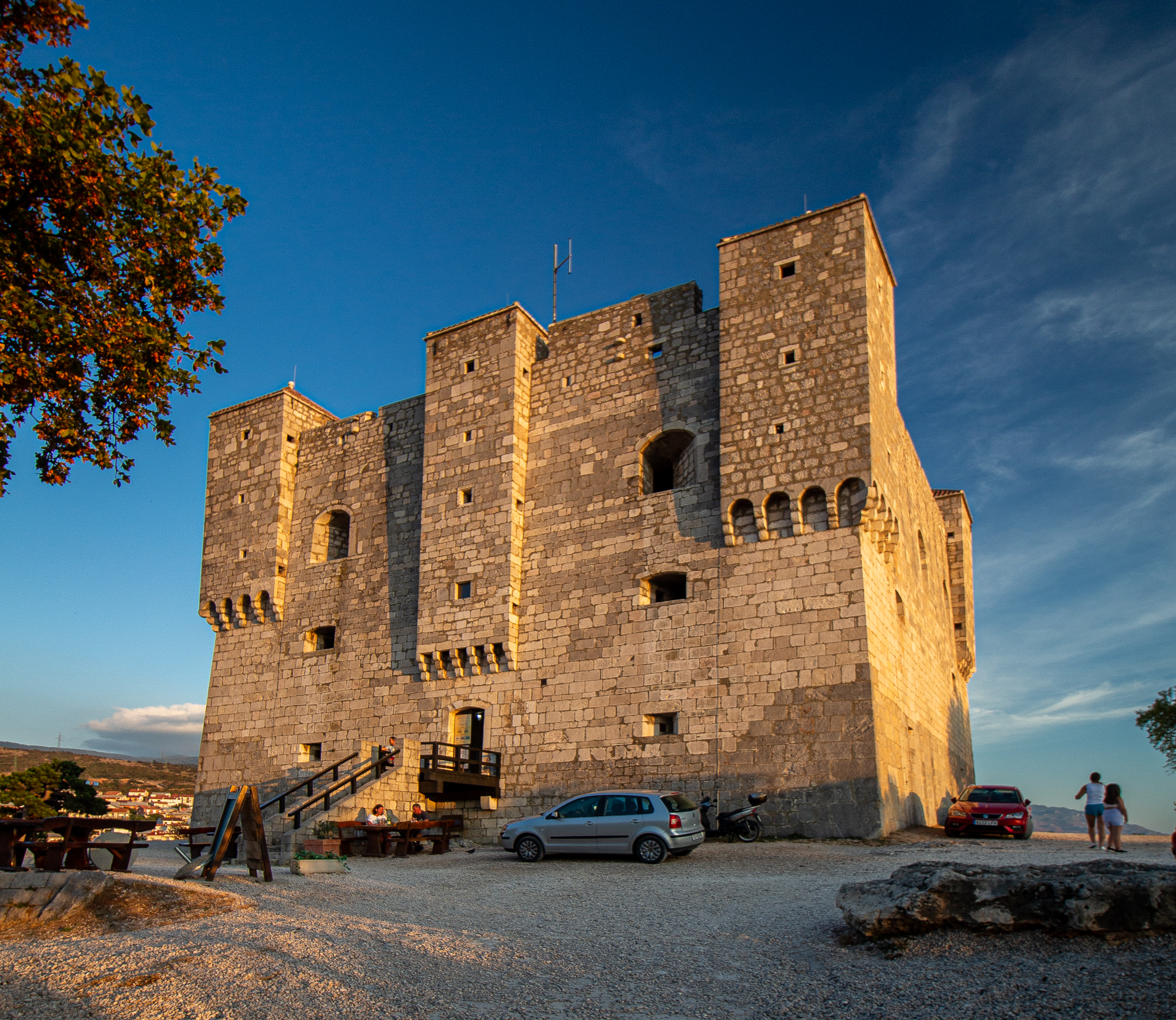
- Fortress Nehaj

- Location within Croatia
- 44.986°N 14.903°E
- Location: Senj, in Lika-Senj County; Croatia

Site notes
- Governing body: Uskoci

Cultural Good of Croatia
- Official name: Nehaj Castle

The Nehaj Fortress (Croatian: Tvrđava Nehaj [tʋr̩dʑaʋa nexaj]) is a fortress on the hill Nehaj in the town of Senj, Croatia.

== Name ==
The name Nehaj comes from the Croatian term Ne hajati, which means 'don't care'. In Croatian this fortress has also other names, which are: Kula Nehaj, what means Nehaj Tower, and Nehajgrad, what means Nehajtown.

This name was given to the hill and the Fortress by the Uskoks, who built on the top of this hill the Fortress for defensive purposes. They gave the hill and the Fortress such a name because they wanted to emphasize to the citizens of the town of Senj, and all of those that lived in the vicinity of the town of Senj, that they should not worry that someone will conquer this hill or the Fortress as long as they are there.

== Description ==
The fortress is 18 metres (59 ft) tall and 23 metres (75 ft) wide, and square shaped with walls averaging from 2 to 3 metres (6.6 to 9.8 ft) in thickness. There are five towers on top of the Fortress, and eleven large cannon openings along the walls. Inside the Fortress, there are displays of cannons and other household items, as well as a collection of costumes and weapons of the Uskoks of Senj. There is also an annual medieval festival that is held in Senj, and an important part of it is when the "Uskoks" march up to the fortress on horseback. There are also crafting workshops and other medieval themed attractions around the fortress at this time; as well as a detailed overview of its history.

Today, the fortress serves primarily as a museum. With exhibits of weapons, clothing, drawings and models of various things from the time when the fortress was actively used.

== History ==
The fortress was built by Croatian army general Ivan Lenković, a captain of the Uskoks, on the hill Nehaj. Finished in 1558, it was built on the remains of ruined churches, monasteries and houses which were situated outside of the walls of Senj. These buildings were scrapped since it was concluded that they would not survive anyway if they were outside the city walls, as the Ottomans would loot them or use them as housing during sieges. The fortress was mainly built to fight the Ottoman Empire, and to be used as a base for the Uskoks.

== Gallery ==
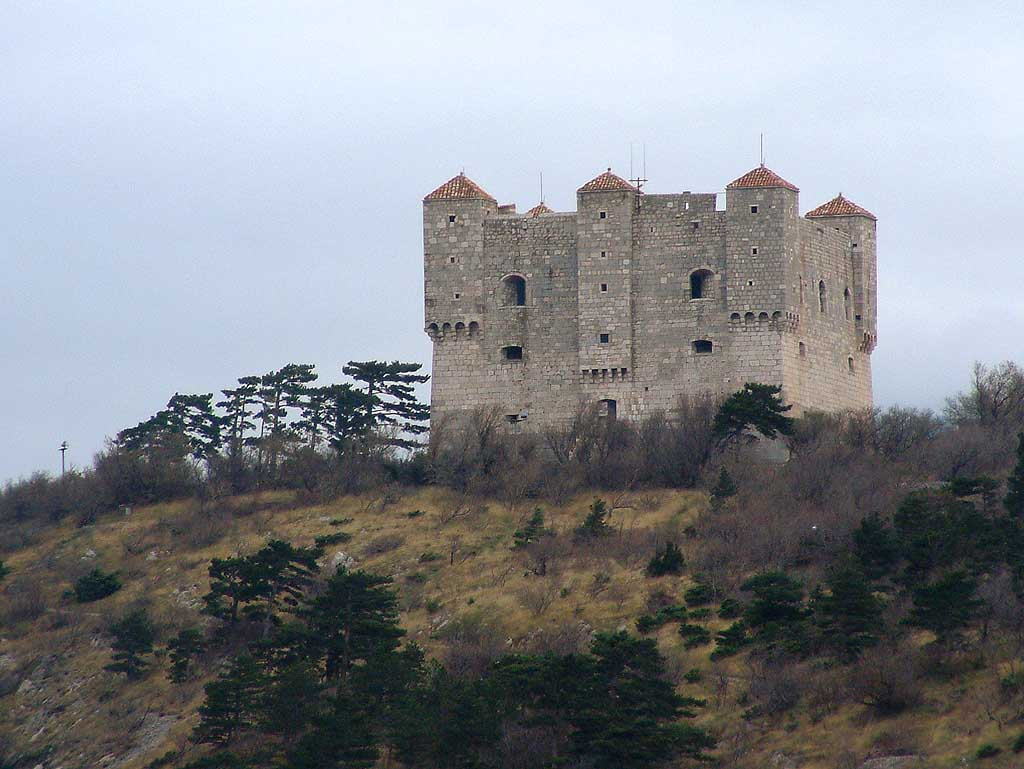
Fortress Nehaj, that is found on the hill Nehaj, is the symbol of the town of Senj.

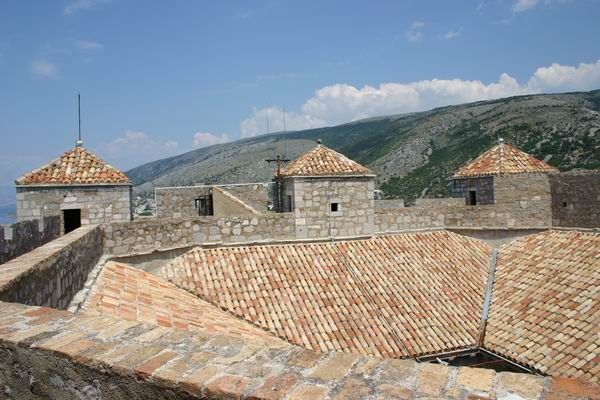
Roof of the Fortress

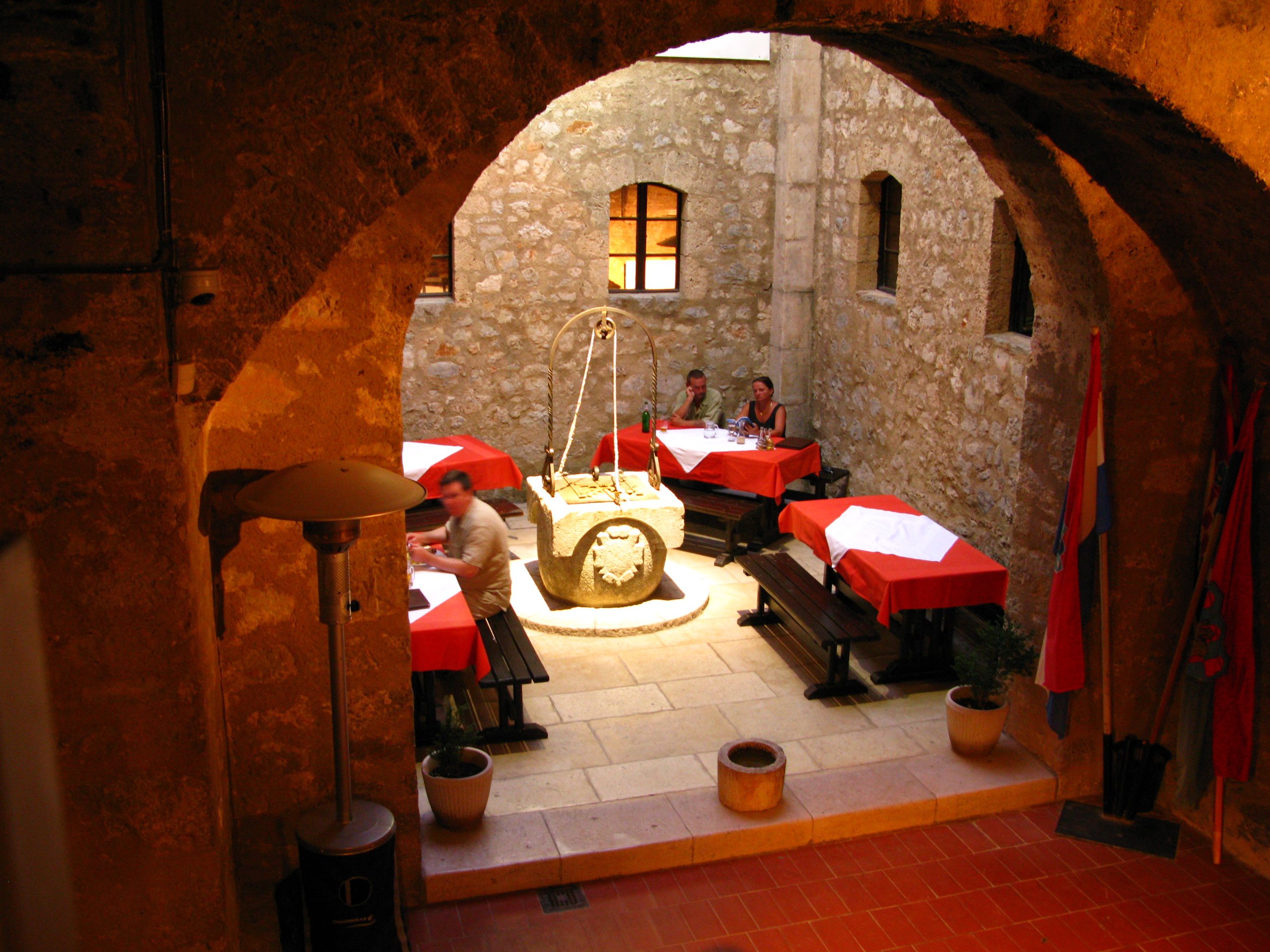
The middle part of the inside of the Fortress

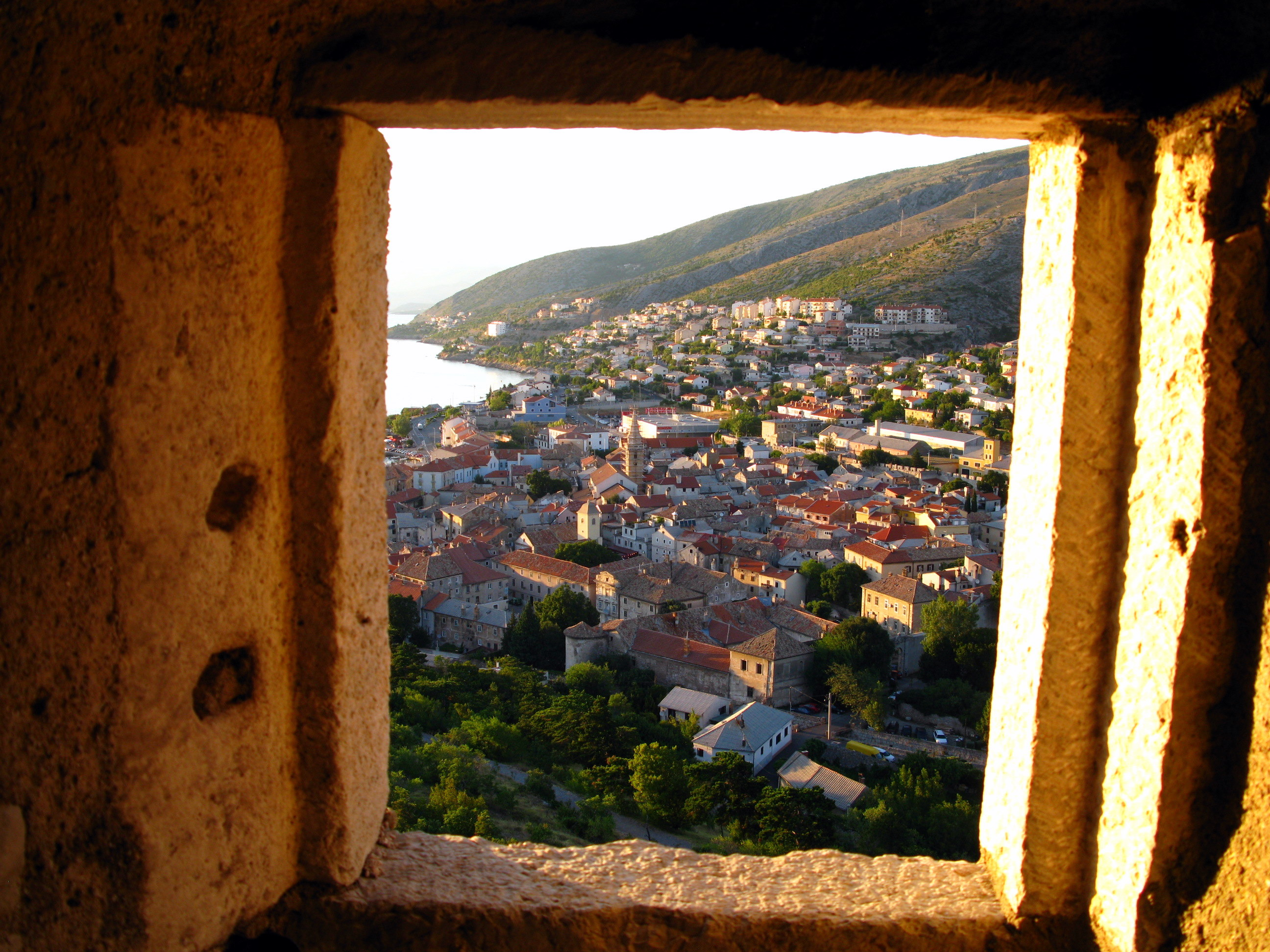
A look through a window on the north side of the Fortress

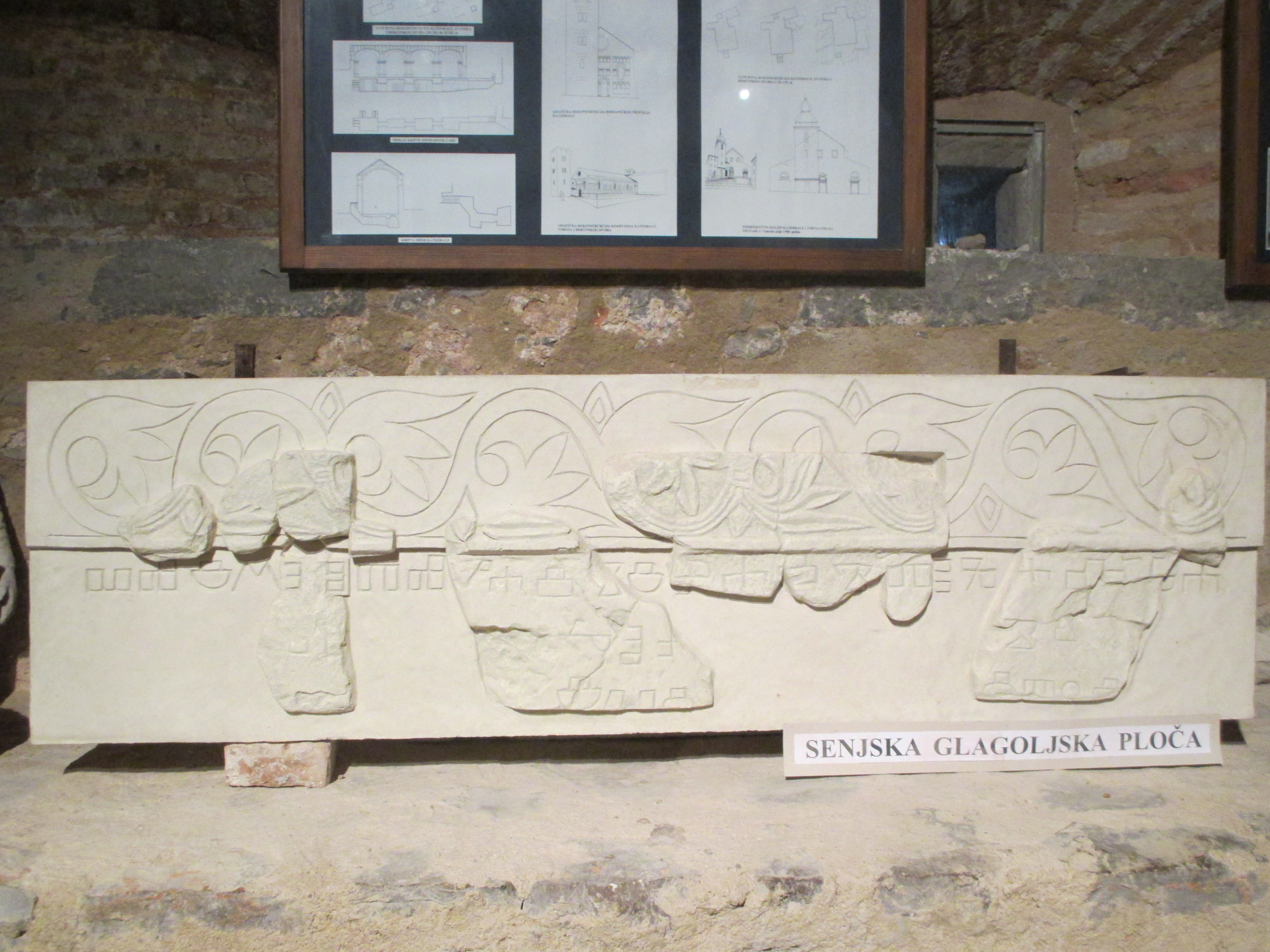
Glagolitic stone of Senj, probably from the pre-romanic church of St.George. Dated around 1100, it is among the oldest documents written in Croatian.

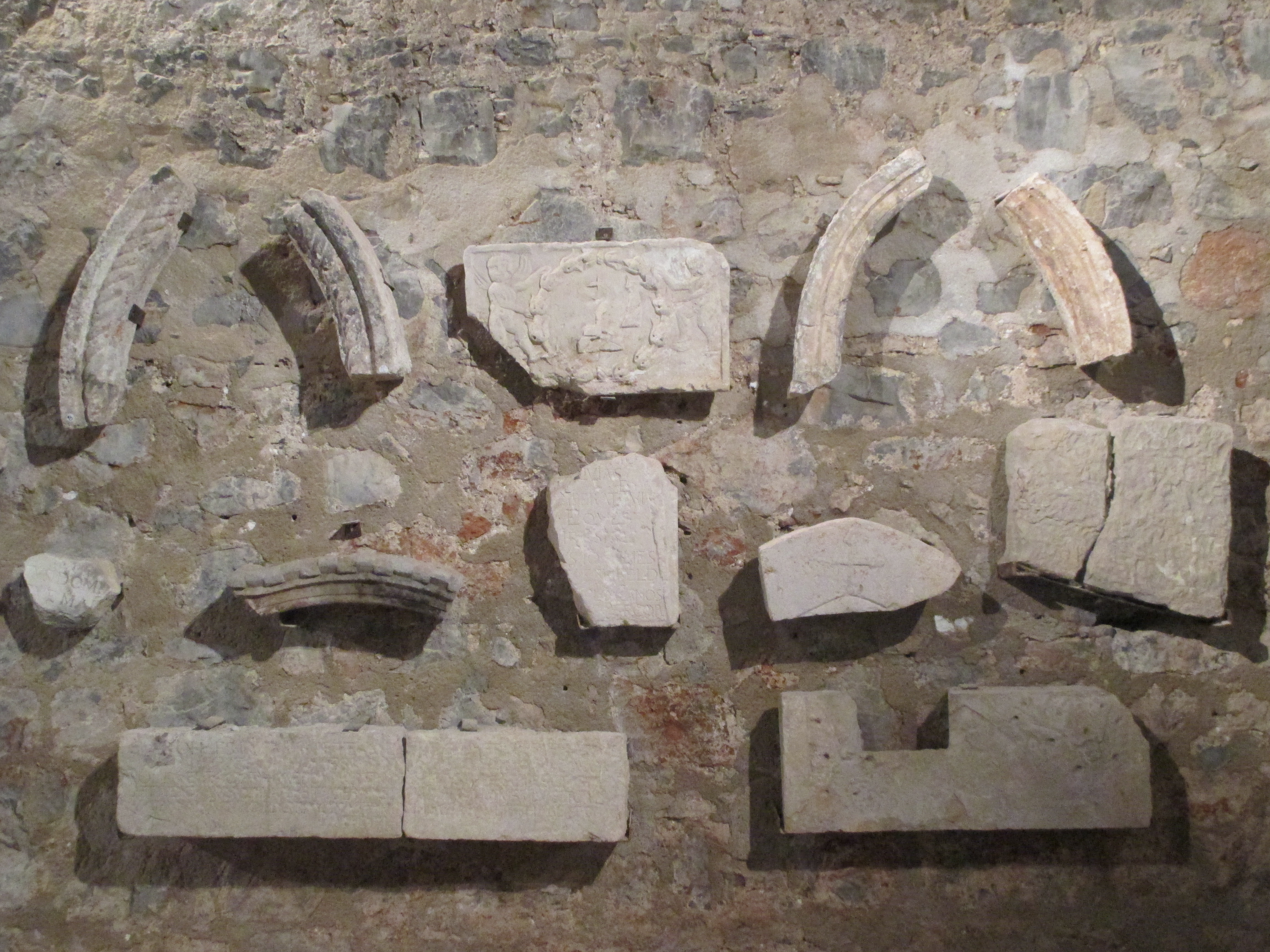
Remains from the pre-romanic church of St.George in Senj (11th-12th century), burnt down during the Turks' attack of 1520

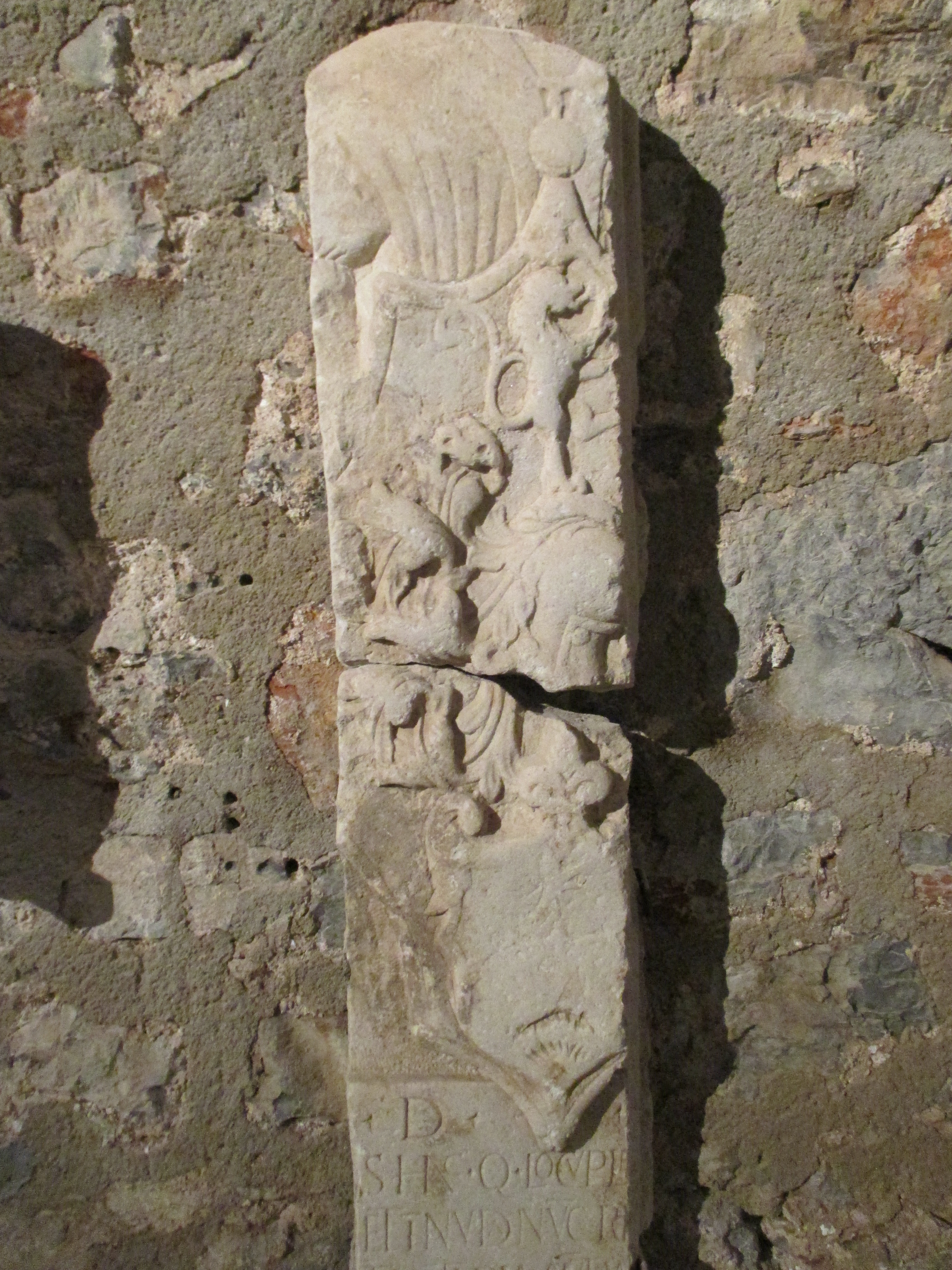
Remains from the pre-romanic church of St.George in Senj (11th-12th century), burnt down during the Turks' attack of 1520

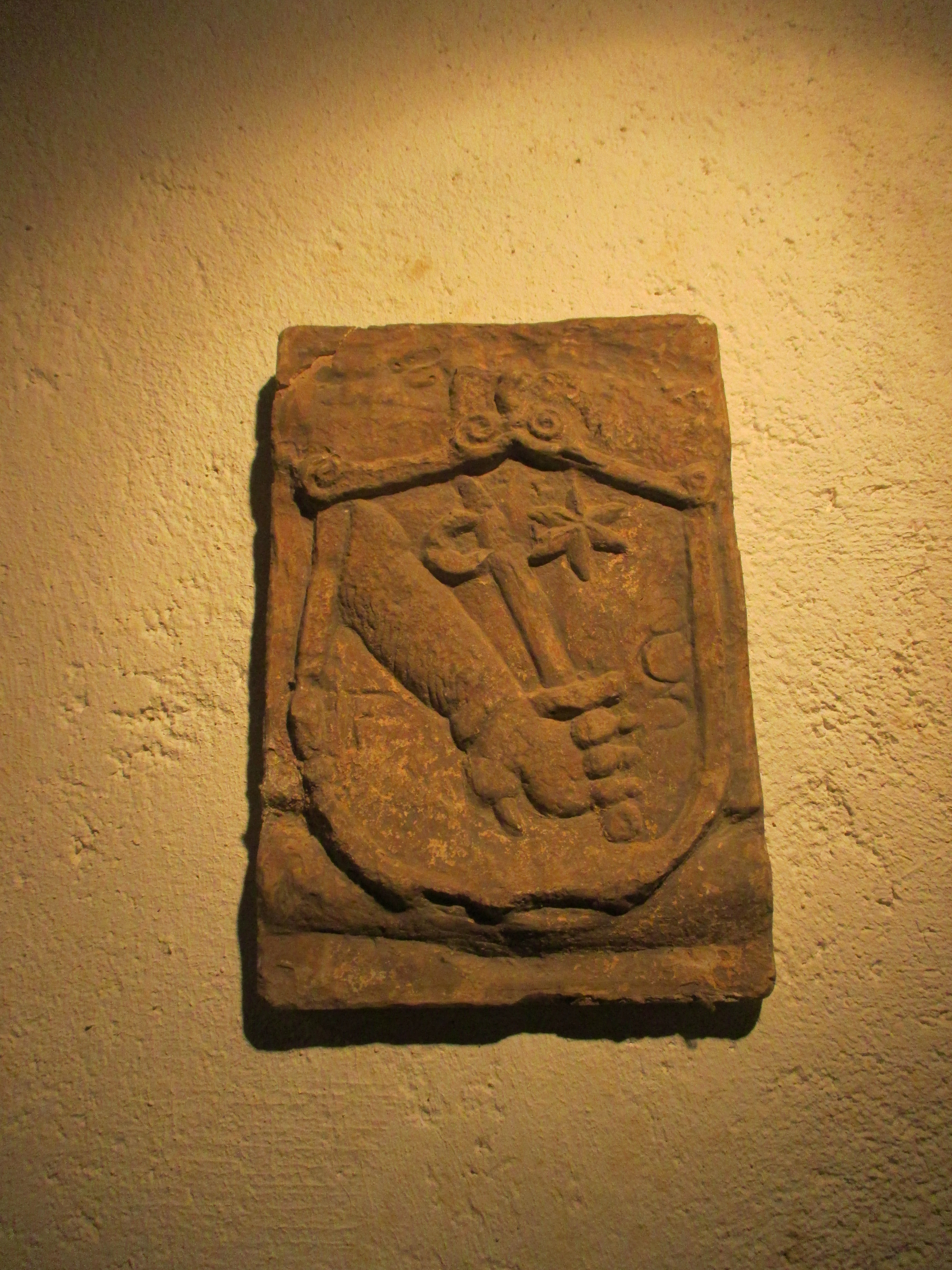
Senj Nehaj coat of arms

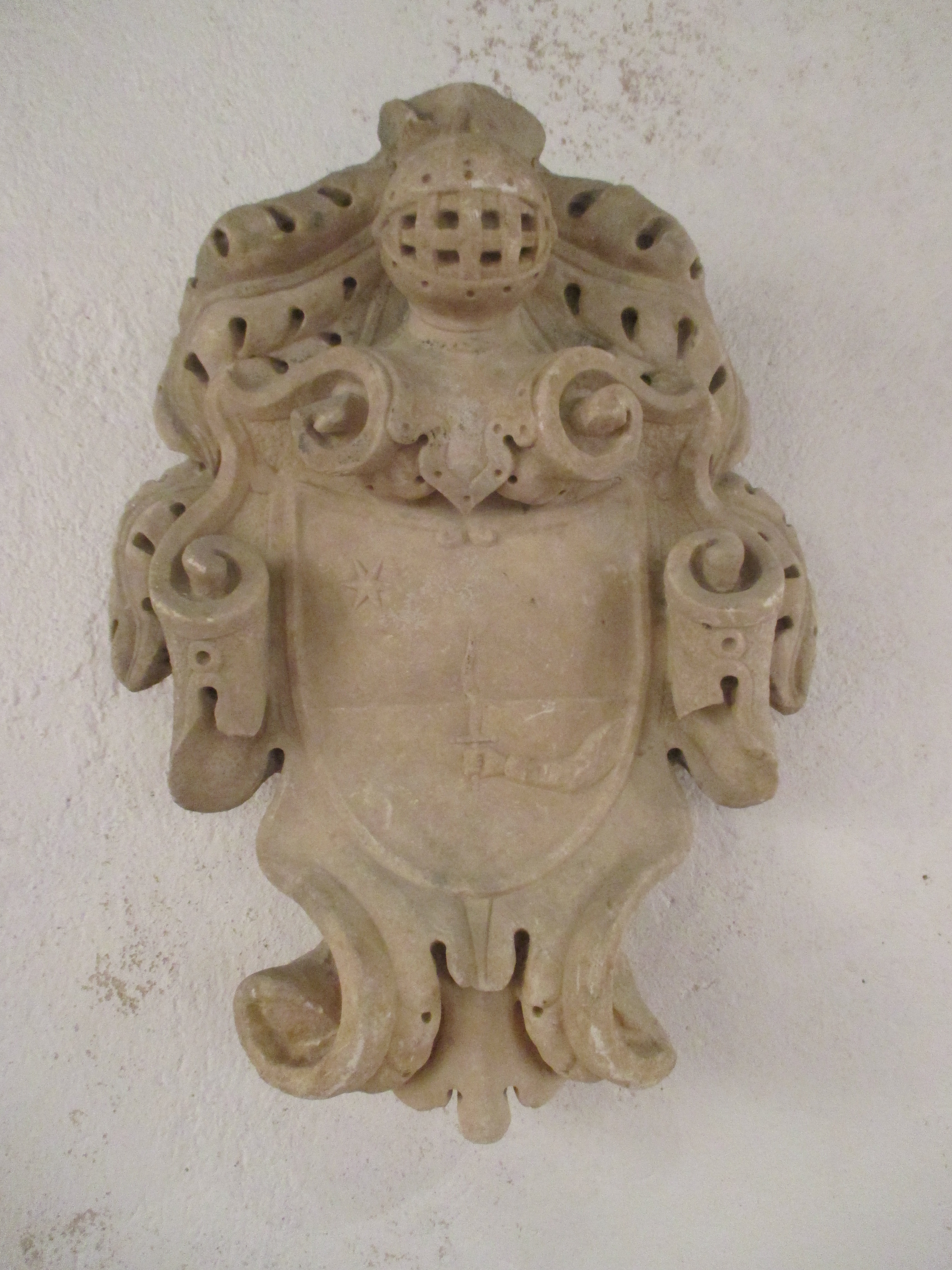
Senj Nehaj coat of arms

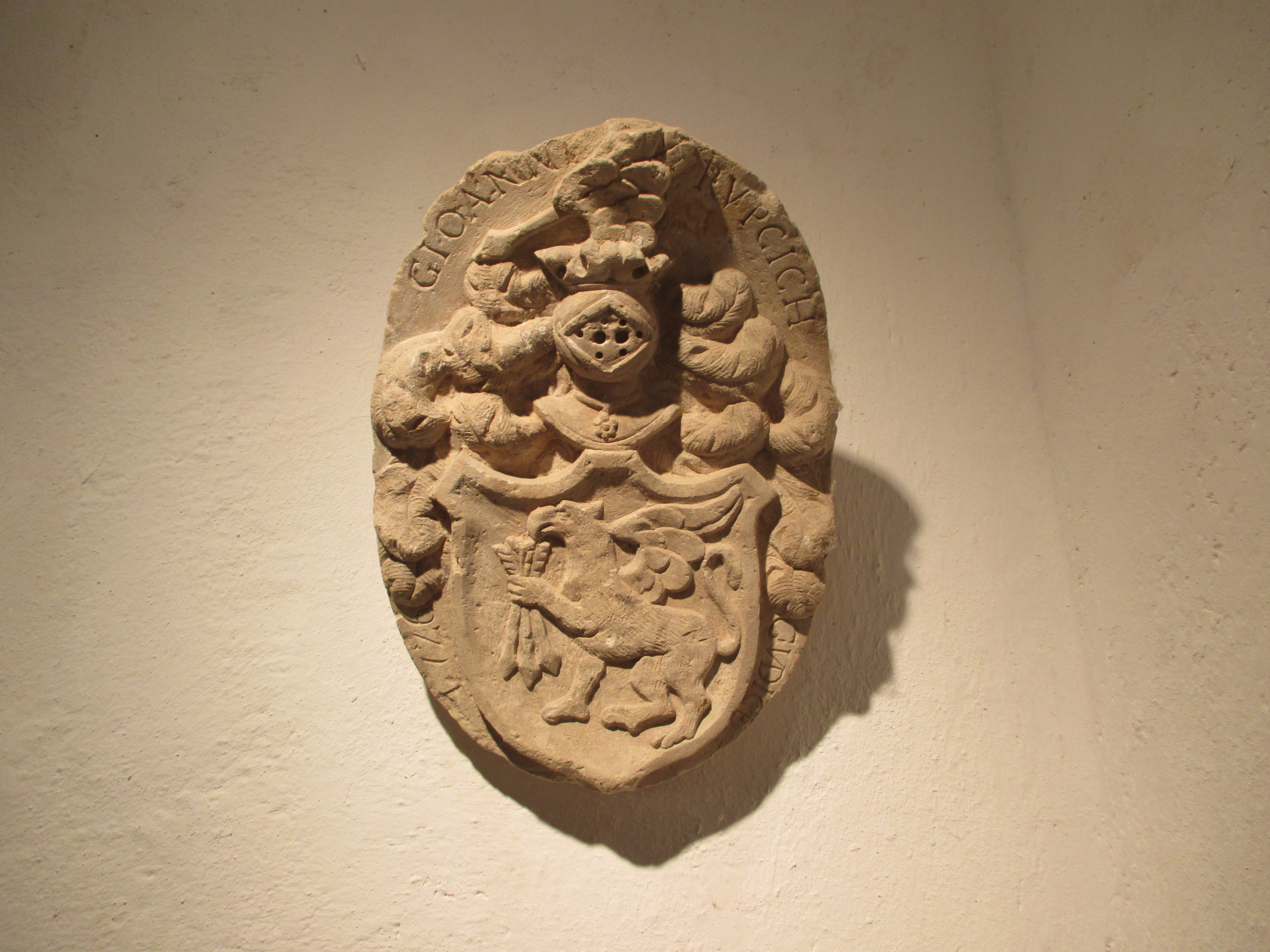
Senj Nehaj coat of arms

== See also ==
- List of museums in Croatia
- The Outsiders of Uskoken Castle
