= Castle Rotondo =

- Dvorac Rotondo (Croatian)
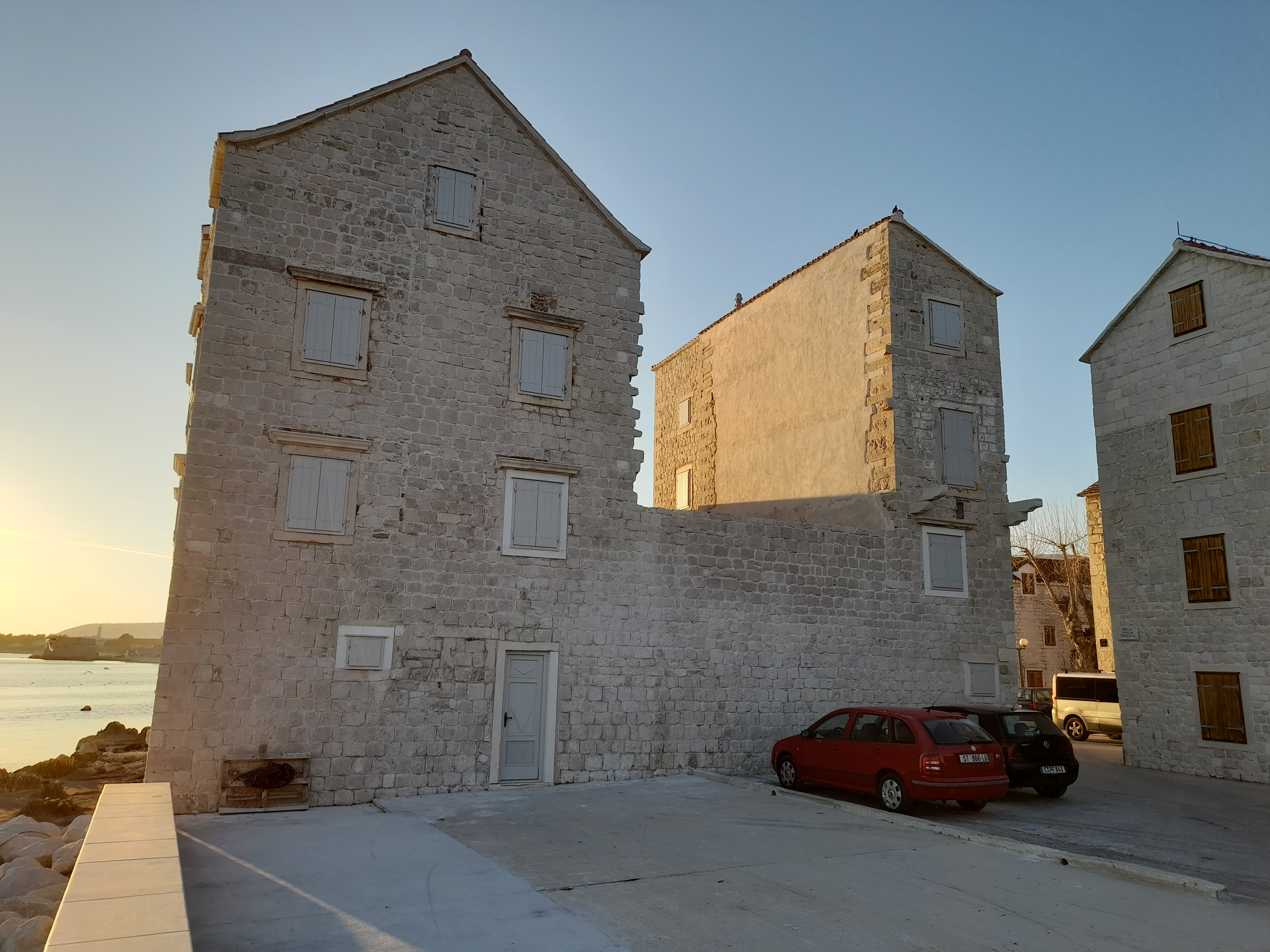
- Castle in 2022

- Location within Croatia
- Interactive map of Castle Rotondo
- 43.547553°N 16.335450°E
- Location: Kaštel Štafilić, Dalmatia, Croatia

History
- Built: 1508

Site notes
- Area: Kaštel Štafilić

Castle Rotondo is a fortress castle in Kaštel Štafilić, Croatia, on the Adriatic coast. It was fully constructed in 1508, on the order of Stefano Štafileo, a Trogirian nobleman, to protect his lands and the Kozjak's peasants from the Ottomans pillaging. It is situated by a beautiful sea cliff.

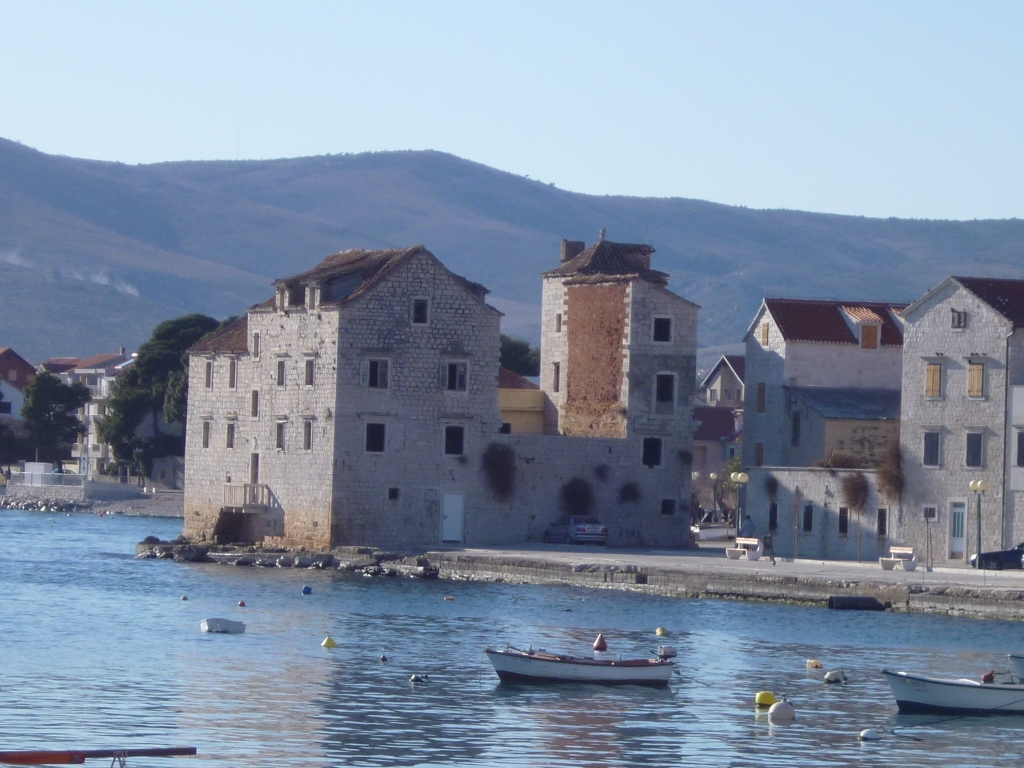
Castle in 2012, before major renovations

Parallel to the castle, there is a fortified renaissance house, where there is the Stafileo's family crest, engraved with a bunch of grapes. The grapes are a visual translation of the Štafileo name, which means bunch of grapes in Greek. The crest symbolizes wine making, and the future. There is also an inscription in Latin above the castle gate, which states the original purpose behind the Castle's construction. The southern residential wing of the house has a water gate that still exists today.

== Origin of the name ==
Castle Rotondo is named after the noble family, 'Rotondo' that resided in it for over 400 years. Prior to this, it was 'Castle Štafileo'.

== History ==
The first owner, and builder, Stefano Štafileo arrived from Crete, Greece, and married a woman from Trogir. He became a well-respected resident of Trogir with houses and residences all over town.

Stefano's son Ivan Štafilić was Bishop of the diocese of Sibenik, Archdeacon in Trogir, a doctor in law, lecturer in Rome, the papal legate, diplomat, Croatian Latinist, and later, Polish nobility.

Ivan was a diplomat to Pope Leo X, handled the divorce of King Henry VIII of England, and Catherine of Aragon. Was baptized by the French king Francis I in 1519. The King of Poland, Sigismund I the Old, gave Ivan a title, and a priceless painting. The painting can be found today in the church of Kaštel Štafilić.

== Function ==
The Castle functioned as a Fortress, where it protected villagers from invading Turkish occupiers.

== Size ==
The Castle has an area of 1,127 m^{2}, with a ground floor, and three higher floors,
