= Rižinice monastery =

- Samostan Rižinice
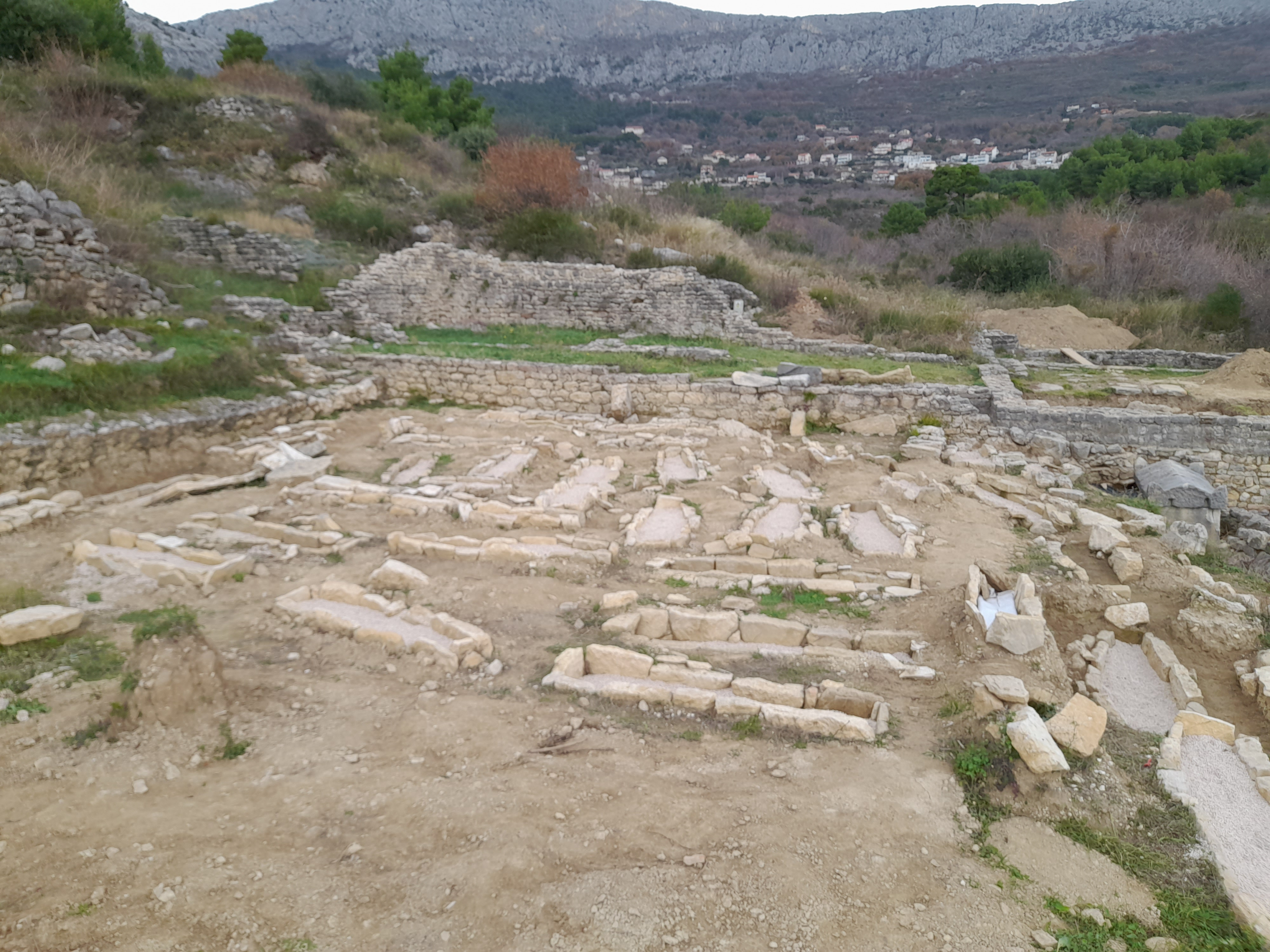
- Rupotine archeological site
- Interactive map of Rižinice monastery

Monastery information
- Order: Benedictines
- Established: antiquity (villa rustica); late antiquity (early Christian church); 9th century (converted to Benedictine monastery)

Site
- Coordinates: 43°33′18″N 16°29′56″E

Rupotine is an archeological site near Solin, Croatia, which is believed by Croatian archaeologists to be the site of medieval Rižinice monastery. It is considered one of the most significant early medieval Croatian archeological sites due to the inscription of duke Trpimir "PRO DUCE TREPIME(ro)" which was found here.

== Description ==
Archeological dig Rižinice is situated northeast of Solin, next to the road leading to Klis fortress, on the eastern slopes of mount Mali Kozjak. According to Ivana Čačija, the monastery complex consisted of one nave church facing north–south, surrounded by multiple buildings. The church had a wide semi-circular apse (16 x 7,40 meters). Its chancel was divided from the apse by a partition. Its small dimensions, claims Čačija, suggest that it was intended for monastery's religious service. Just west of the church, there were two rooms; one of which seems to be the kitchen (as suggested by recovered fragments of medieval ceramics, coal and fragmented dishes with salted olives). The room next to the eastern wall appears to be the funeral chapel as it contained two walled tombs, covered by plates of fragmented Roman sarchophagi.

== History of research ==
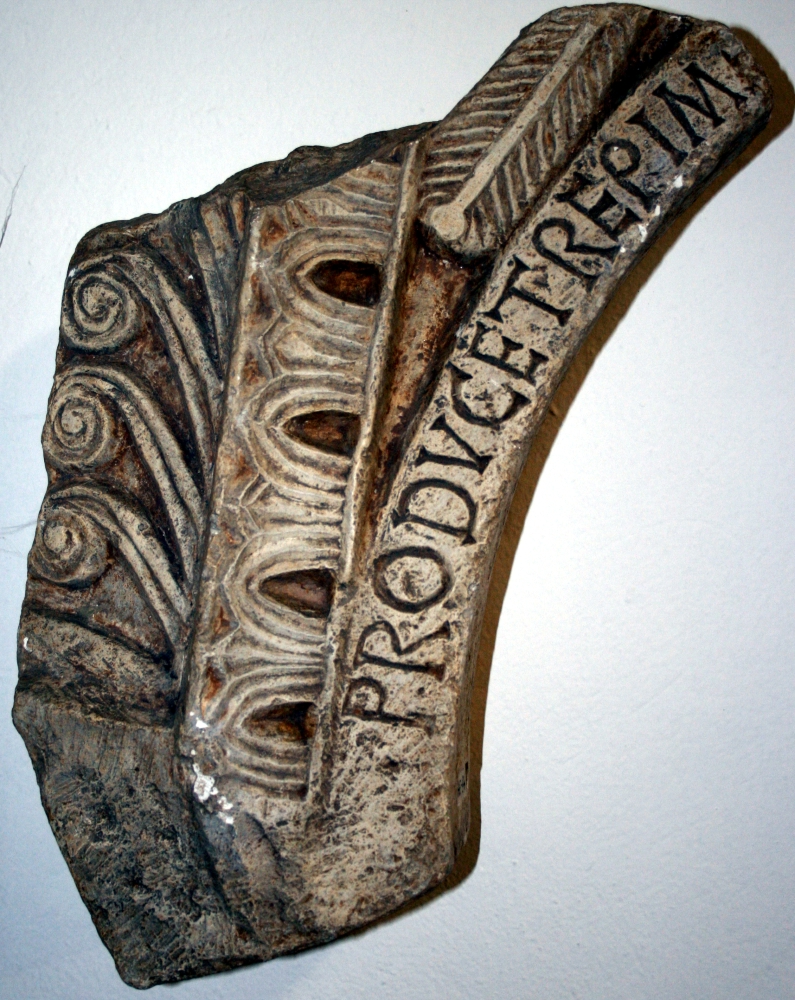
Fragment of a beam with inscription dedicated to duke Trpimir, originally found on Rižinice. According to conservator Radoslav Bužančić inscription referring to duke Trpimir had a text: For duke Trpimir pray to the Jesus Christ with your head bowed down.

The site was discovered in 1891, after accidental discovery of fragment of gable arch from an altar screen bearing inscription: „PRO DUCE TREPIME(ro)“. This fragment was discovered by local people who tore down some walls, during property demarcation. The news of this reached Croatian archeologist Frane Bulić who then bought the fragment for the Archeological museum. Due to this fragment, as well as another piece of information provided by Daniele Farlati, Bulić subsequently concluded that the place is a site of 9th century Rižinice monastery built by duke Trpimir of Croatia, also referred to in Grant of Trpimir (Croatian: Trpimirova darovnica). There are, however, experts more sceptical of the idea, such as Ljubo Gudelj Velaga, who claims he's still not able to "neither to confirm, or deny the idea".

Bulić conducted initial research in 1895, 1896 and 1908. Eventually the remains of a church with wide semi-circular apse (16 x 7,40 meters) were discovered. After initial research done by Bulić, another series of research was made in 1930's by Ljubo Karaman and Ejnar Dyggve. Dyygve discovered that the site was much larger than previously thought, and considered that it used to be an early Christian church, which was subsequently adapted during medieval period by further adding a walled monastery complex with defensive tower facing the nearby creek.

The western part of the complex was partially damaged during 1952 construction of Solin-Klis road when, graves on western part were destroyed. In 1989 Museum of Croatian Archeological Monuments bought the site and continued with the research. In 2006 the road above the complex collapsed revealing there is another part of the building beneath it, which was not yet researched. According to Gudelj Velaga, this unresearched part could be "the temple". He claims that conservator-restorers suggested building a bridge over that part to enable the research, however local authorities ordered to bury it again thus delaying the research. Another round of research was conducted in 2011 when swimming pool and numerous sarcophagi from antiquity were discovered. These sarcophagi, however contained "subtenants" from the medieval period. The research also uncovered ciboria and pre-Romanesque findings from the period of Trpimir I.

== Findings ==
According to Radoslav Bužančić, in its initial period, the site was a Roman Villa rustica, likely well preserved until 9th century, when duke Trpimir of Croatia decided to restore it. Trpimir then donated the monastery to the Benedictine monks whom he brought here. Archeological research discovered several layers of graves in Rižinice. The earliest layer of graves contained bones of deceased people as well as pieces of jewelry like earrings and rings. The complex also contained a pagan burial site dated between 1st and 3rd century AD. Besides series of glass, stone and clay Urns, there was also a child grave in semi-preserved amphora, lacrymatories, and a cosmetics plate. From the period of early medieval Croatian state, 10 oval graves covered by stone plates were recovered.

In one of the graves, remains of a woman from 10th century were found, whom the archeologists nicknamed "Joza". Its skeleton was sent to Penn State University in United States of America, where its CT scan was made. Forensics concluded that Joza died at an age between 23 and 30, that she was well fed and gave birth to least one child. Its jewelry; earrings and rings enabled archeologists to conclude that she was put to rest somewhere in 10th century. Joza's teeth were also well preserved and her body did not have signs of single trauma. The same grave also contained older male body (aged 50), which was put to rest here some 100 years earlier.

Relics found here suggest continuity of burial on the site, spanning from antiquity to the period of Venetian rule in the region.

== Gallery ==
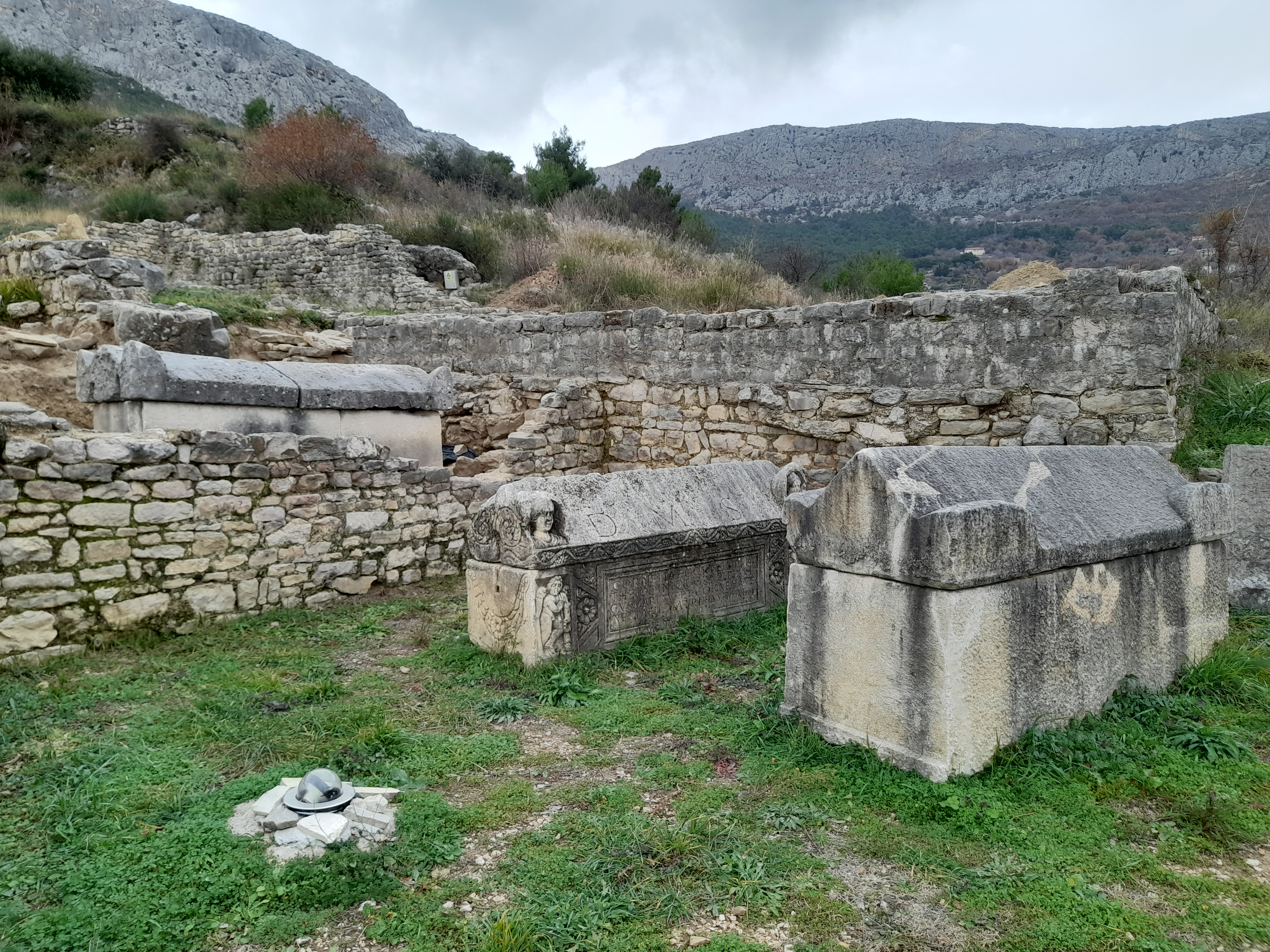
Late antiquity sarcophagi in Rižinice

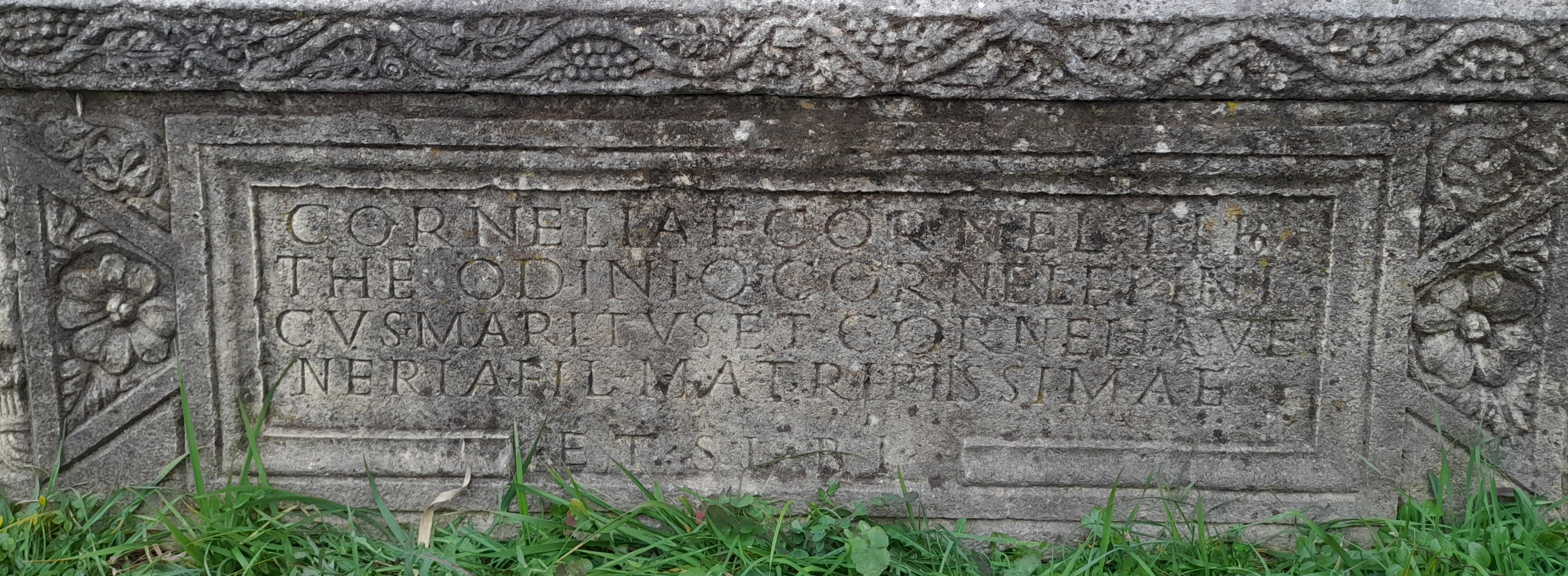
Epitaph of a Roman woman named Cornelia.

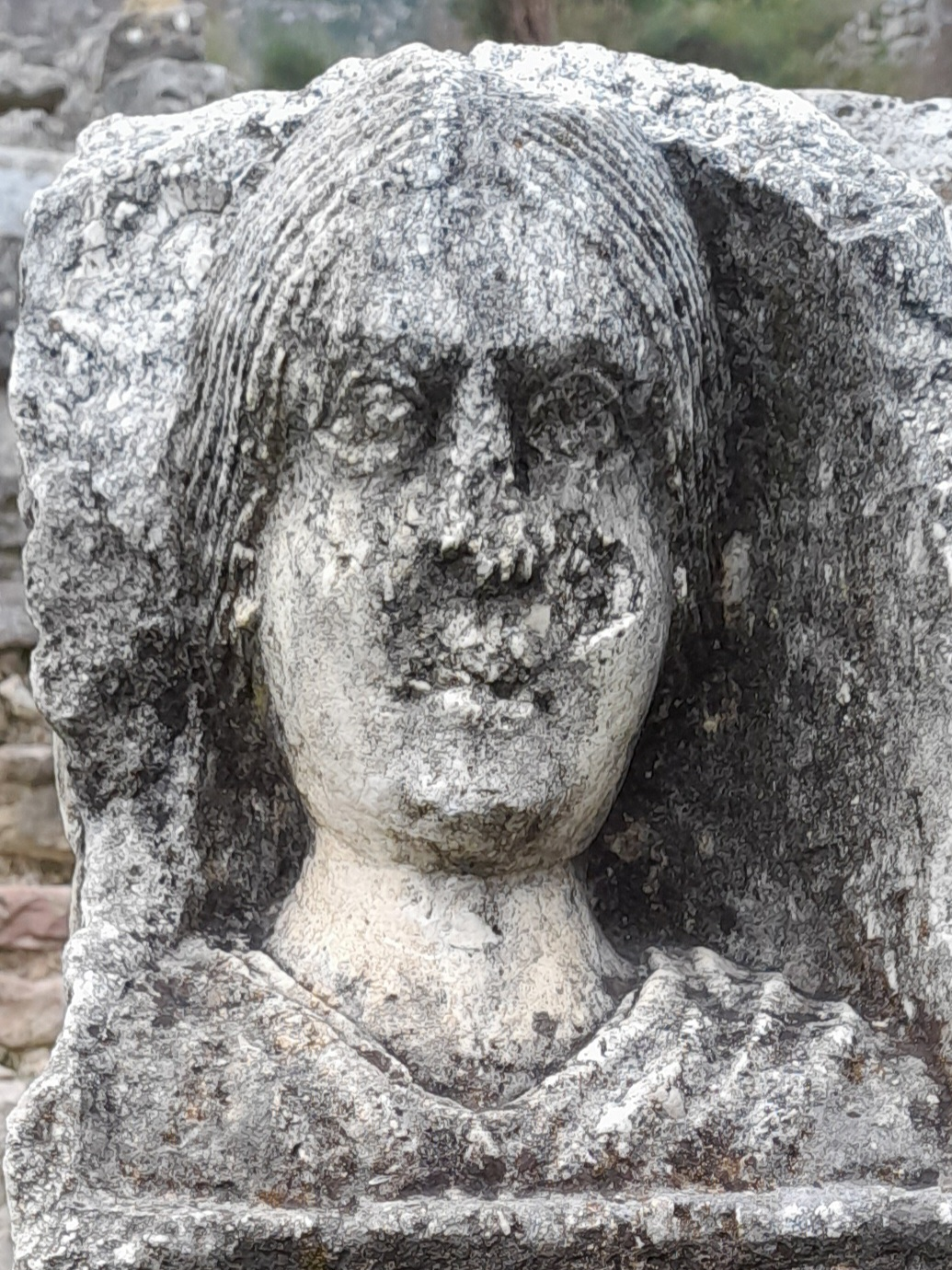
Face from the Cornelia's sarcophagus.

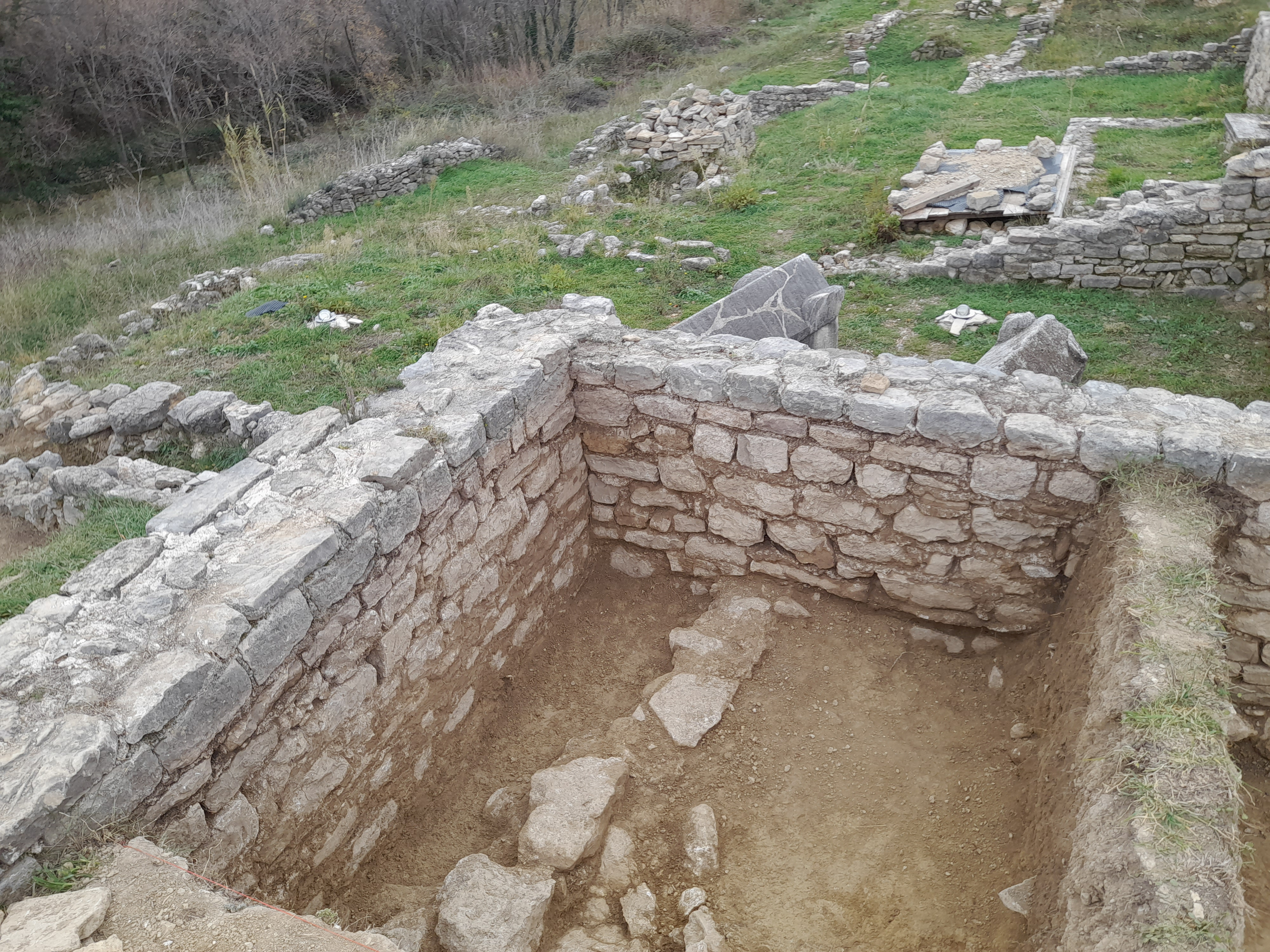
Walls of the old complex.

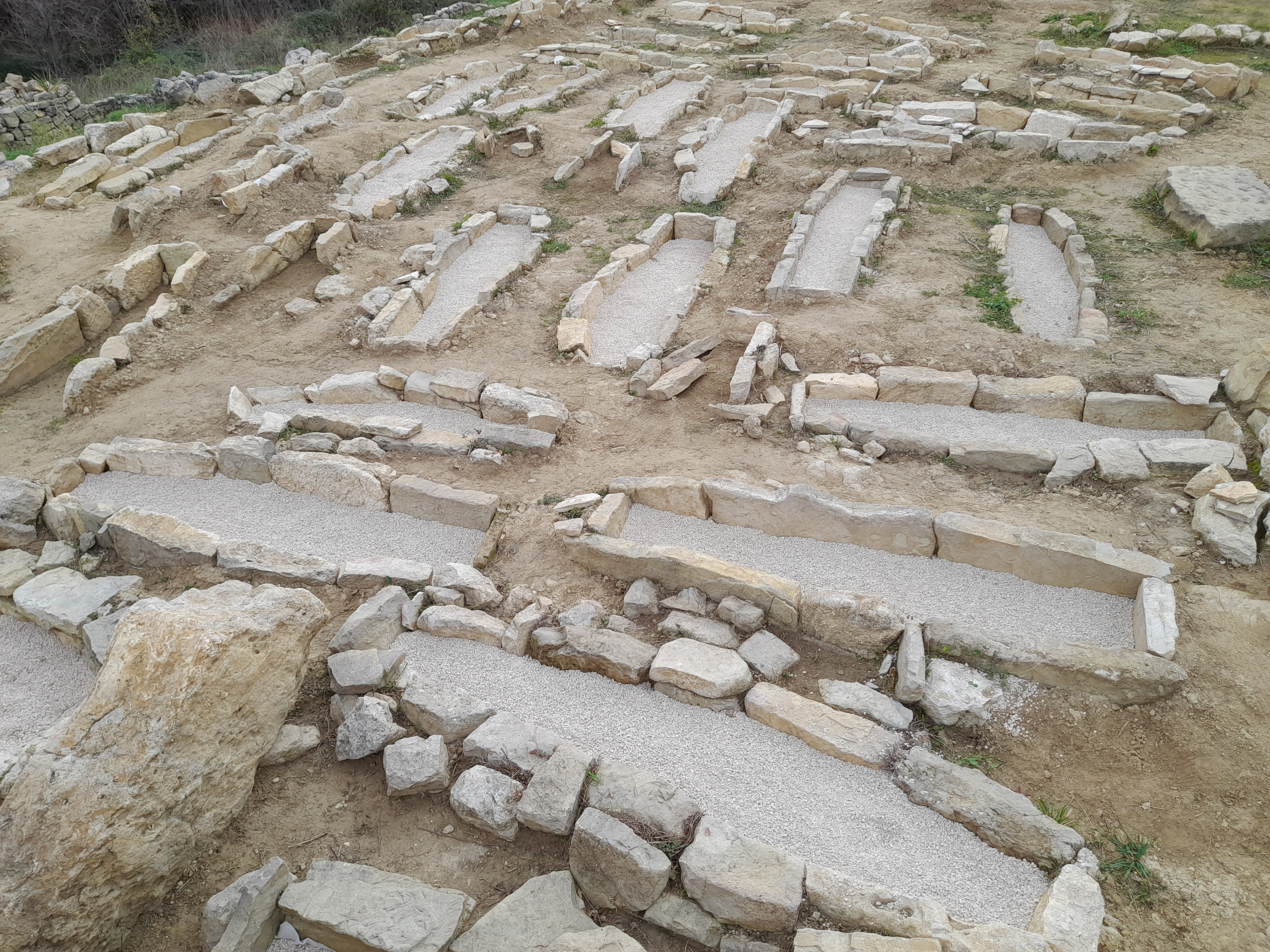
Unearthed graves.
