= Domald of Sidraga =

Croatian nobleman

Domald of Sidraga (Domaldus, Domaldi Spalatensis) (c. 1160–1243) was a powerful and influential Croatian nobleman. He held Šibenik, Zadar, Split, Klis, Cetina and other Dalmatian counties and estates between the mid-12th and mid-13th century in the Kingdom of Croatia. He came into conflict with the powerful Šubić family. With royal support, the Šubić family seized Domald's domains in 1223, but Domald's influence didn't wane until his death.

== Life ==
Born around 1160, Domald's aristocratic family origin and estates which brought him to power are uncertain. Historians assumed various doubtful theories including that he was a member of the noble Snačić or Kačić family. Recently discovered image of Domald's seal with coat of arms depicting "an eagle with spread wings and head turned to the right, holding in its talons a snake" most probably refutes both family connections. He most probably was from the župa of Sidraga. According to Thomas the Archdeacon, he was a "man of great caution and foresight".

He is possibly mentioned as Duke/Count of town of Šibenik already in 1200, but others date his rule as certain only since 1216–1220. Since 1203/4, after the Crusader's Siege of Zara, is mentioned as Duke of town of Zadar, rebuilding town Biograd na Moru, and with the help of Šibenik and Omiš threw Venetian rule from the island of Ugljan and St. Michael's Fortress. His rule in Zadar proved to be short-lived, because the town accepted the suzerainty of the Republic without resistance after the Venetian navy approached its port.

Before 25 March 1207, the townspeople of Split elected him their Duke, a position which held until 1220/21. In 1210, King Andrew II of Hungary, who ruled Croatia and Dalmatia, bestowed upon Domald the župa, or county, of Cetina and Trilj. In the same period tried to impose his rule in town of Trogir, but managed to get only some estates outside the town, and in 1217 Pontius de Cruce stopped his aspirations toward Trogir.

He was expelled from Split by the citizens in 1221. The citizens of Split elected a member of the Šubić family, Višan/Višen of Zvonigrad their new Duke, causing a feud between Domald and the Šubić family. King Andrew's son, Duke Béla, who administered Croatia/Dalmatia at that time, intervened in the conflict on behalf of Domald's opponents in 1223. The Duke laid siege and seized the Fortress of Klis. Domald was forced to renounce his domains which were distributed among Grgur Šubić and Stjepan Šubić. However, he kept Klis until 1226/27, when lost it to Grgur and according to Miha Madijev de Barbezanis, was even temporarily captured by Grgur. Anyway, Domald waged a full-scale war on both land and sea until 1229, helped by Kačić family, when was captured by Slavonian-Dalmatian Duke Coloman, and eventually ransomed by his family for twelve nobles.

Domald somehow managed to keep his influence in the region, was again invited and made Duke of Split in 1234/35, replacing Grgur III Šubić, who instead placed his son Marko II Šubić in 1235/37, overthrowing Domald. However, Domald regained Šibenik before January 1238, attacked Trogir ruled by Stjepan II Šubić, but was defeated by royal/Šubić forces at Klis. His last mention was in a 1243 agreement with Trogir about exchanging his mills in Pantan for a house in Trogir.

== Descendants ==
His distant direct descendants are mentioned in 1356 and 1358, specifically brothers Slavogost and Domald Hiliich (of Ilija), their sons Rusin and Grgur (of Slavogost) and Ilija (of Domald), and nephews Hrvatin of Juraj and Nerad of Miroslav. They gifted the early 13th century charters and estates, bestowed by king Andrew II, and confirmed rights to Ivan Nelipčić (their eorum consanguineo) which Nelipčić received by king Louis I of Hungary.

== Sources ==
- Thomas Spalatensis (2006). Damir Karbić; Olga Perić; James Ross Sweeney (eds.). History of the Bishops of Salona and Split. Central European University Press. ISBN 9786155211089.
- Ančić, Mladen (2005). "Splitski i Zadarski kaptol kao "vjerodostojna mjesta"". Fontes (in Croatian and Latin). 11 (1). Zagreb: Croatian State Archives: 11–77.
- Duplančić, Arsen (2008). "Pečat splitskog i šibenskog kneza Domalda" [A Seal of Prince Domald of Split and Šibenik]. Archaeologia Adriatica (in Croatian). 2 (1): 243–249. doi:10.15291/archeo.950.
- Érszegi, Géza; Solymosi, László (1981). "Az Árpádok királysága, 1000–1301 [The Monarchy of the Árpáds, 1000–1301]". In Solymosi, László (ed.). Magyarország történeti kronológiája, I: a kezdetektől 1526-ig [Historical Chronology of Hungary, Volume I: From the Beginning to 1526] (in Hungarian). Akadémiai Kiadó. pp. 79–187. ISBN 963-05-2661-1.
- Fine, John V. A. (1994). The Late Medieval Balkans: A Critical Survey from the Late Twelfth Century to the Ottoman Conquest. The University of Michigan Press. ISBN 0-472-08260-4.
- Isailović, Neven (2016). "Između otpora i lojalnosti – niže plemstvo na područjima pod vlašću i utjecajem Nelipčića nakon 1345. godine". Povijesni prilozi (in Croatian). 35 (50). Zagreb: Croatian Institute of History: 263–293.
- Karbić, Damir (February 2005). "Šubići Bribirski do gubitka nasljedne banske časti (1322.)" [The Šubići of Bribir until the Loss of the Hereditary Position of the Croatian Ban (1322)]. Zbornik Odsjeka za povijesne znanosti Zavoda za povijesne i društvene znanosti Hrvatske akademije znanosti i umjetnosti (in Croatian). 22. Croatian Academy of Sciences and Arts: 1–26.
- Magaš, Branka (2007). Croatia Through History. SAQI. ISBN 978-0-86356-775-9.
- Švab, Mladen (1993), "Domald", Croatian Biographical Lexicon (HBL) (in Croatian), Miroslav Krleža Lexicographical Institute
