= Pontius de Cruce =

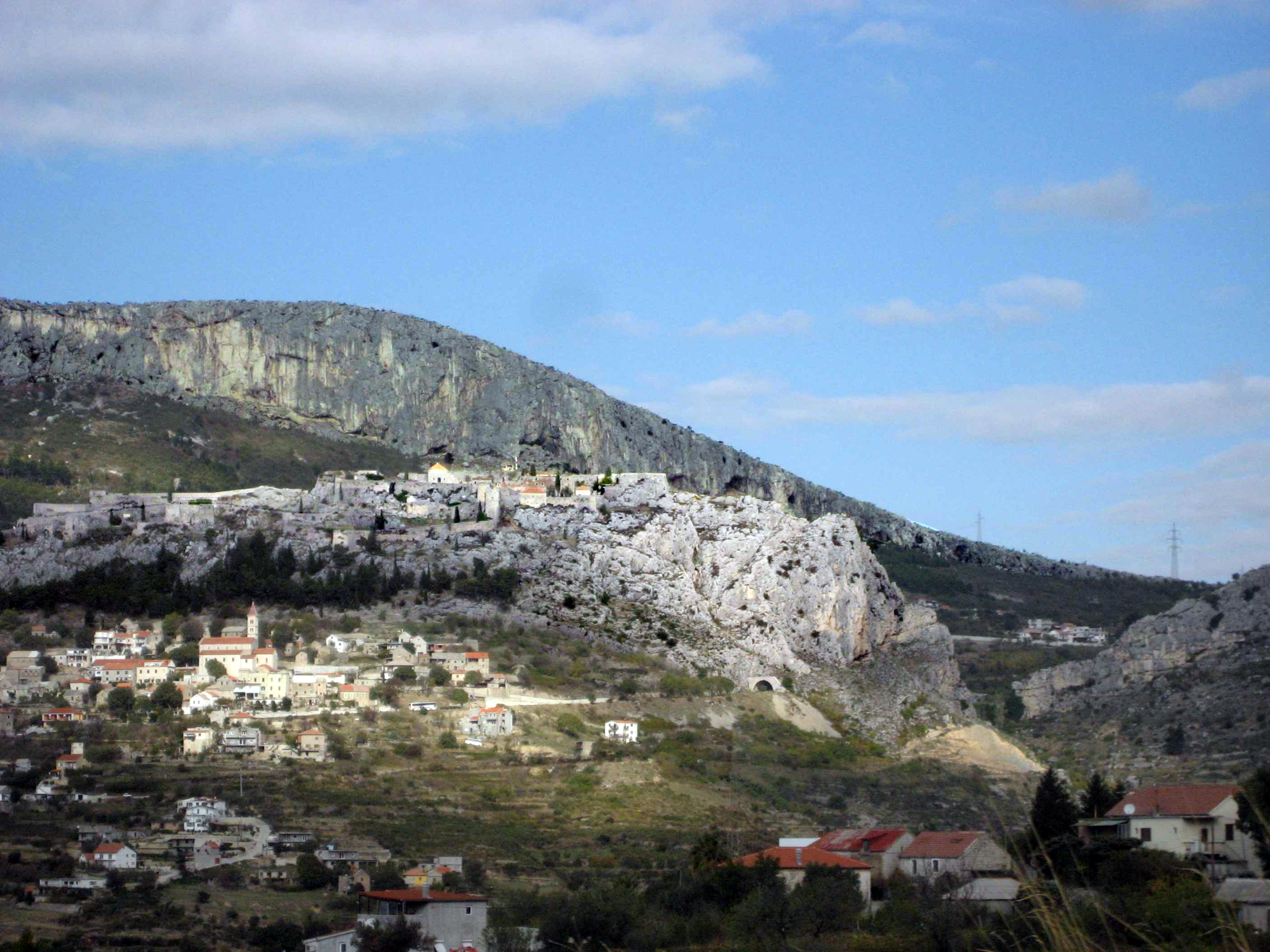
Andrew II of Hungary had made over to the Templars the Castle of Klis in Croatia. Shortly after this, the Templars lost Klis, and in exchange the king gave them the coastal town of Šibenik.

Pontius de Cruce, also Pons of the Cross, was a Master of the Templars.

Andrew II of Hungary was extremely favorably disposed towards the Templars. During his participation in the Fifth Crusade he appointed Pontius de Cruce, Master of the Order in the Hungarian Kingdom, as a regent in Croatia and Dalmatia.
