= Mali Kozjak =

Mountain in Split-Dalmatia County, Croatia

Kozjak
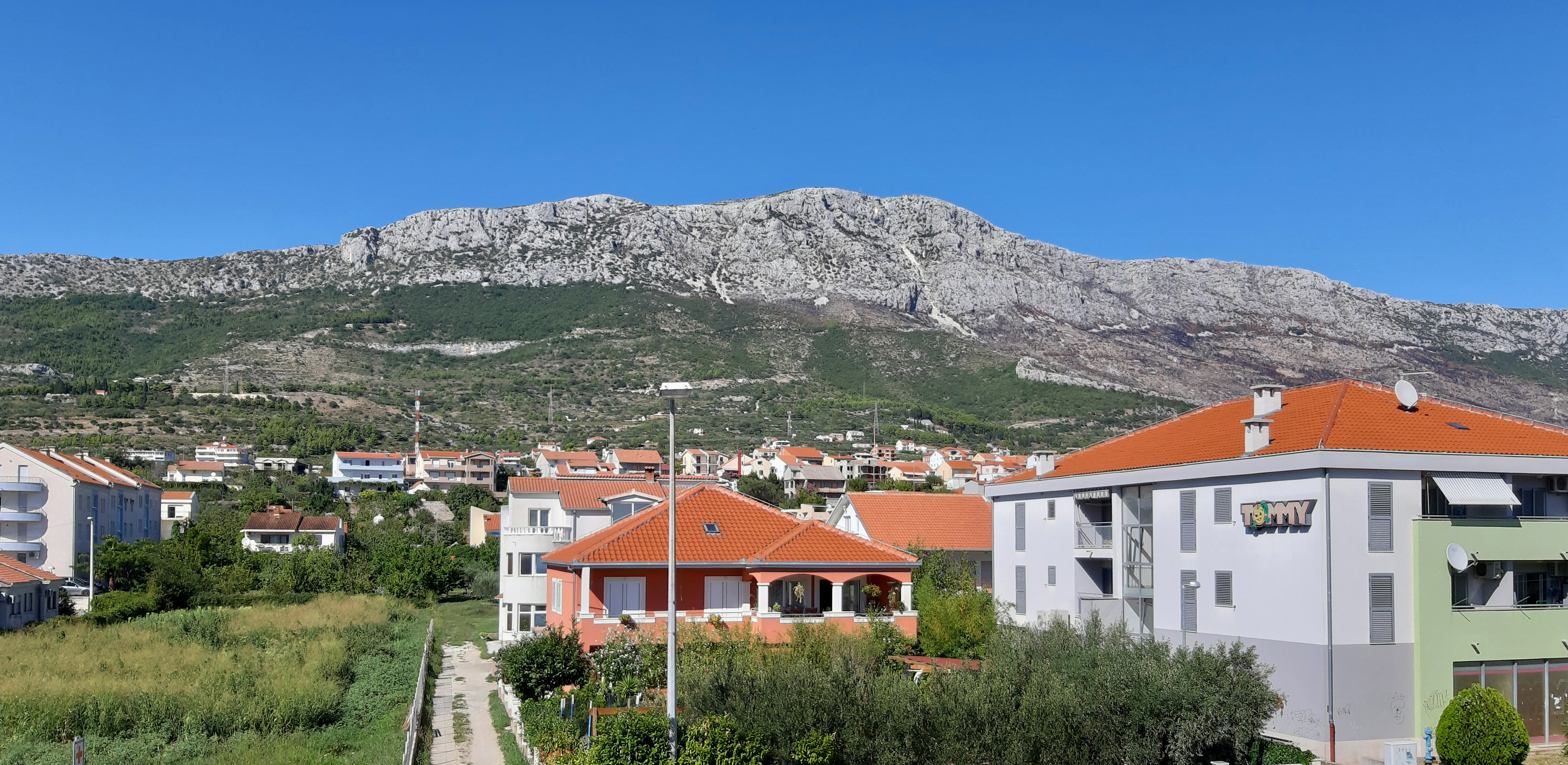
- Kozjak mountain above Kaštela

Highest point
- Elevation: 779 m (2,556 ft)
- Coordinates: 43°34′15″N 16°24′09″E

Geography
- Location within Croatia
- Location: Dalmatia, Croatia
- Parent range: Dinaric Alps

Kozjak, also known as Mali Kozjak or Primorski Kozjak (to differentiate it from Veliki Kozjak) is a mountain located above the town of Kaštela in Dalmatia, Croatia. It belongs to Dinaric Alps, and stretches from the pass of Klis in the southeast, to the above Split Airport in the northwest. The highest peak is Veli vrj (779 m) above Kaštel Gomilica. Its southern slope is very steep, and northern rock slopes gradually turns to the corrugate plateau of Dalmatian Zagora. Kozjak is mainly composed of karst — limestone rocks.

Mali Kozjak above the town of Kaštela is more known than Veliki Kozjak above the village of Kijevo. On the west side of the ridge is the well-known mountain centre of Malačka on 477 m.

Its highest peak overlooks the city of Split, the ancient Roman settlement of Salona, towns of Solin, Kaštela, Trogir, and most of central Dalmatia islands.

== Gallery ==
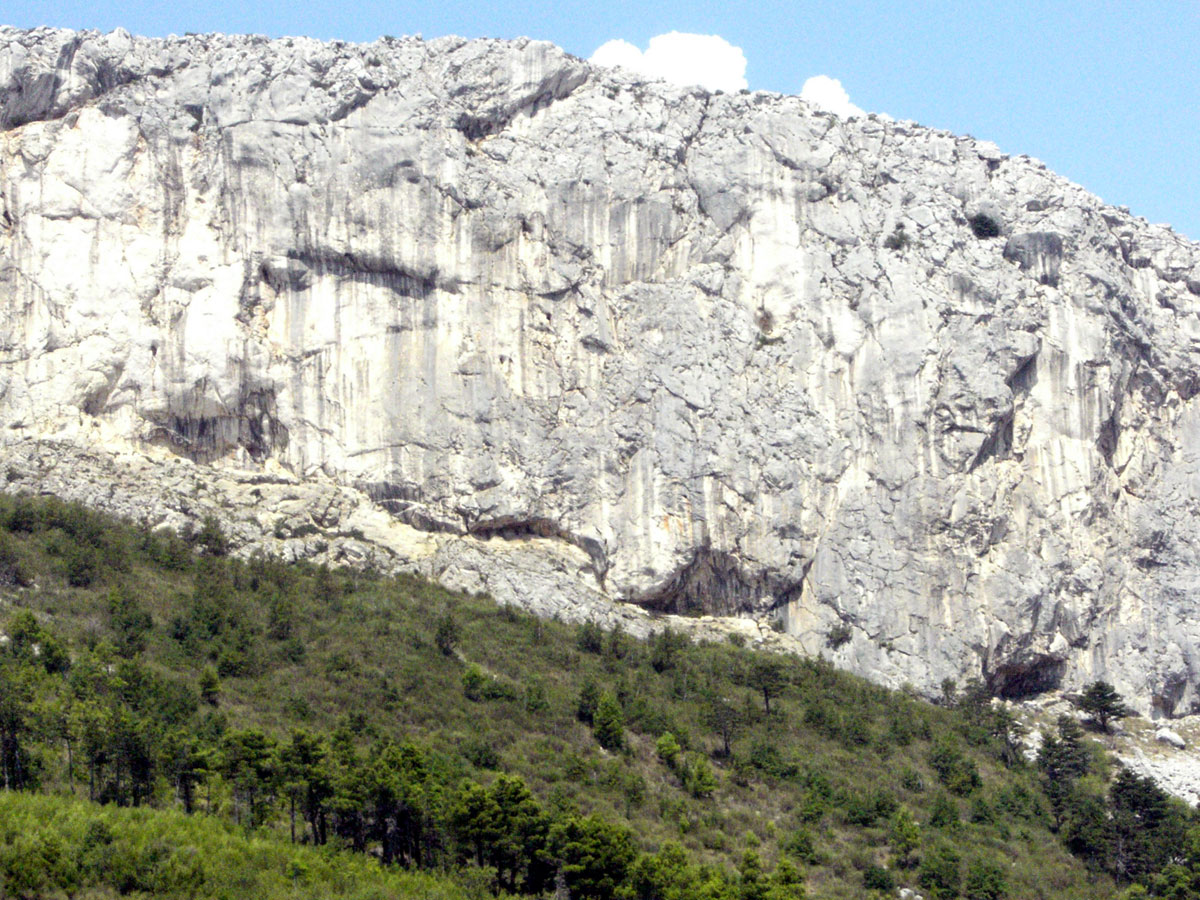
Cliff close-up

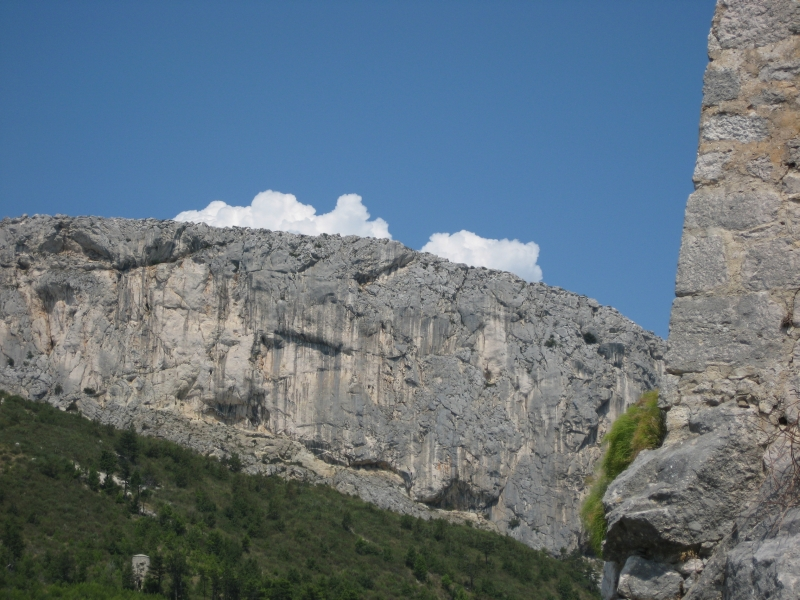
Kozjak

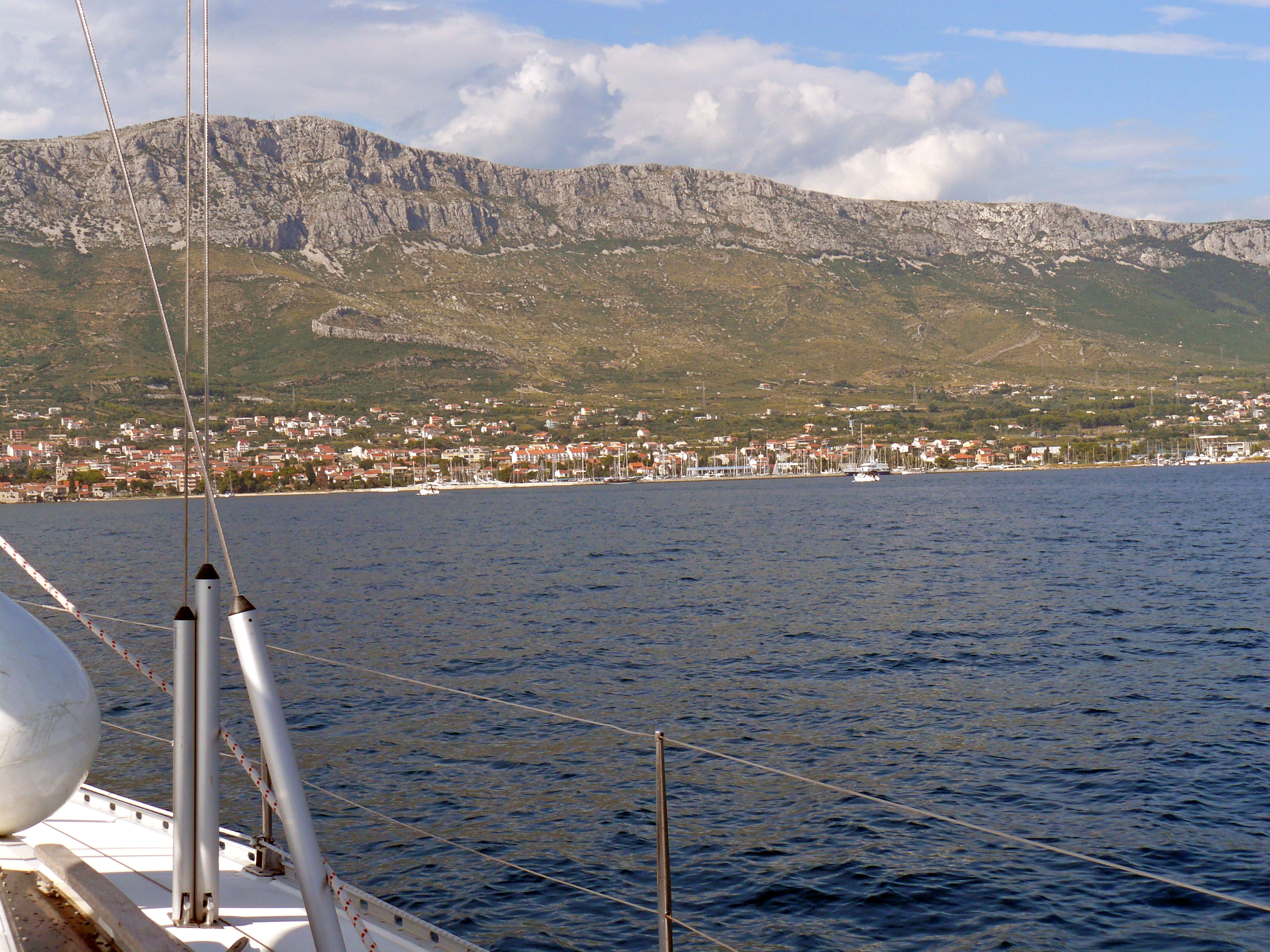
Mountain from Kaštela bay

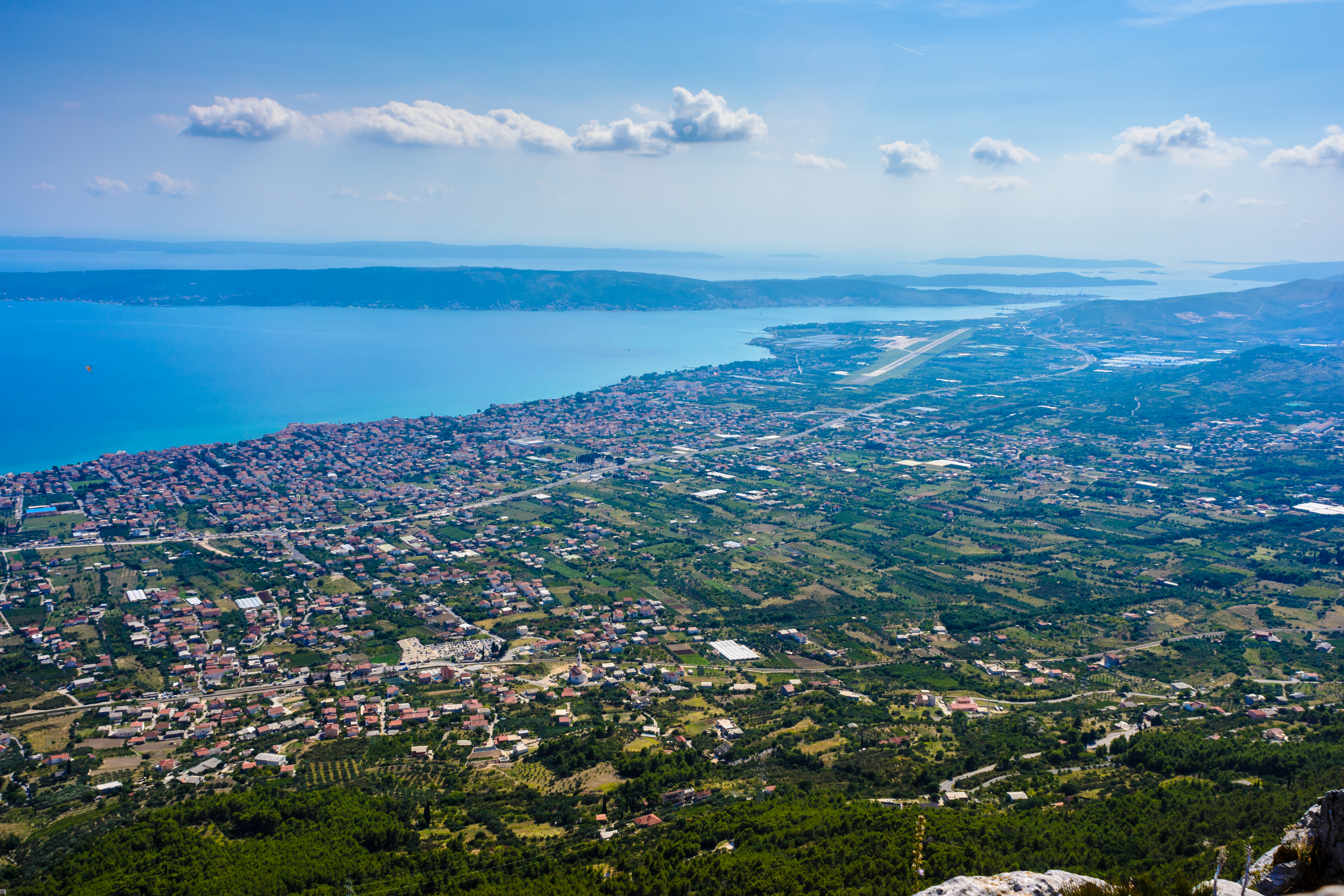
View from mountain

== See also ==
- List of mountains in Croatia
