= Konjsko =

Konjsko is a South Slavic placename, derived from konj ("horse"). It may refer to:

== Croatia ==
- Konjsko, Karlobag, a village in Lika-Senj County, Croatia
- Konjsko Brdo, a village in Lika-Senj County, Croatia
- Konjsko, Klis, a village in Split-Dalmatia County, Croatia

== Bosnia and Herzegovina ==
- Konjsko, Trebinje, a village in Republika Srpska, Bosnia and Herzegovina
- Konjsko, Posušje, a village in the Federation of Bosnia and Herzegovina, Bosnia and Herzegovina

== Elsewhere ==
- Konjsko, Lipljan, a village in Lipljan, Kosovo
- Konjsko, Resen, a village in Pelagonia, North Macedonia
