= Prugovo =

Prugovo may refer to:

- Prugovo, Serbia, a village near Požarevac
- Prugovo, Croatia, a village near Klis
