= Trsat =

Part of the city of Rijeka, Croatia

Coordinates: 45°20′N 14°28′E

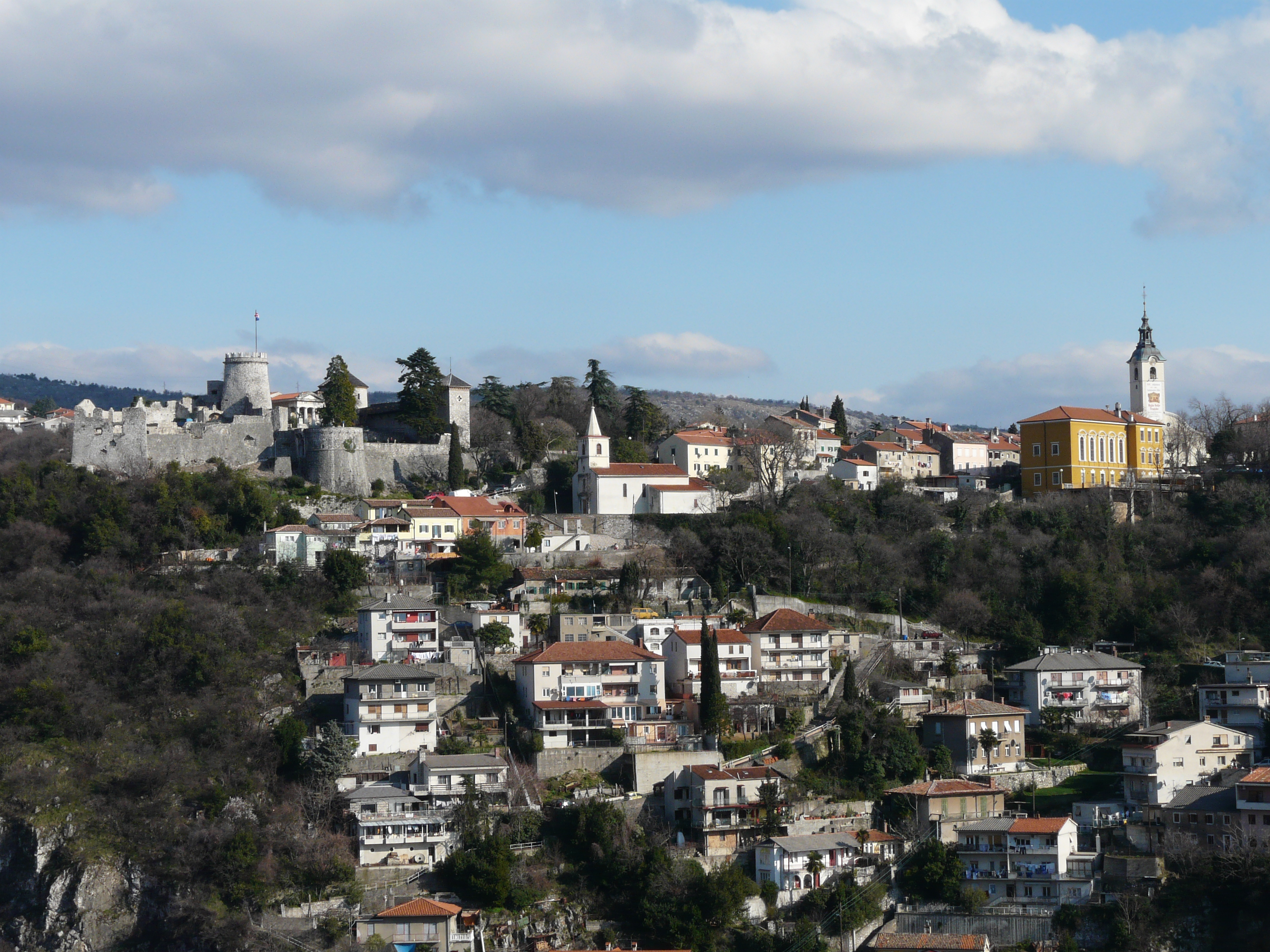
View of Trsat from WSW, from Rijeka mountain area.

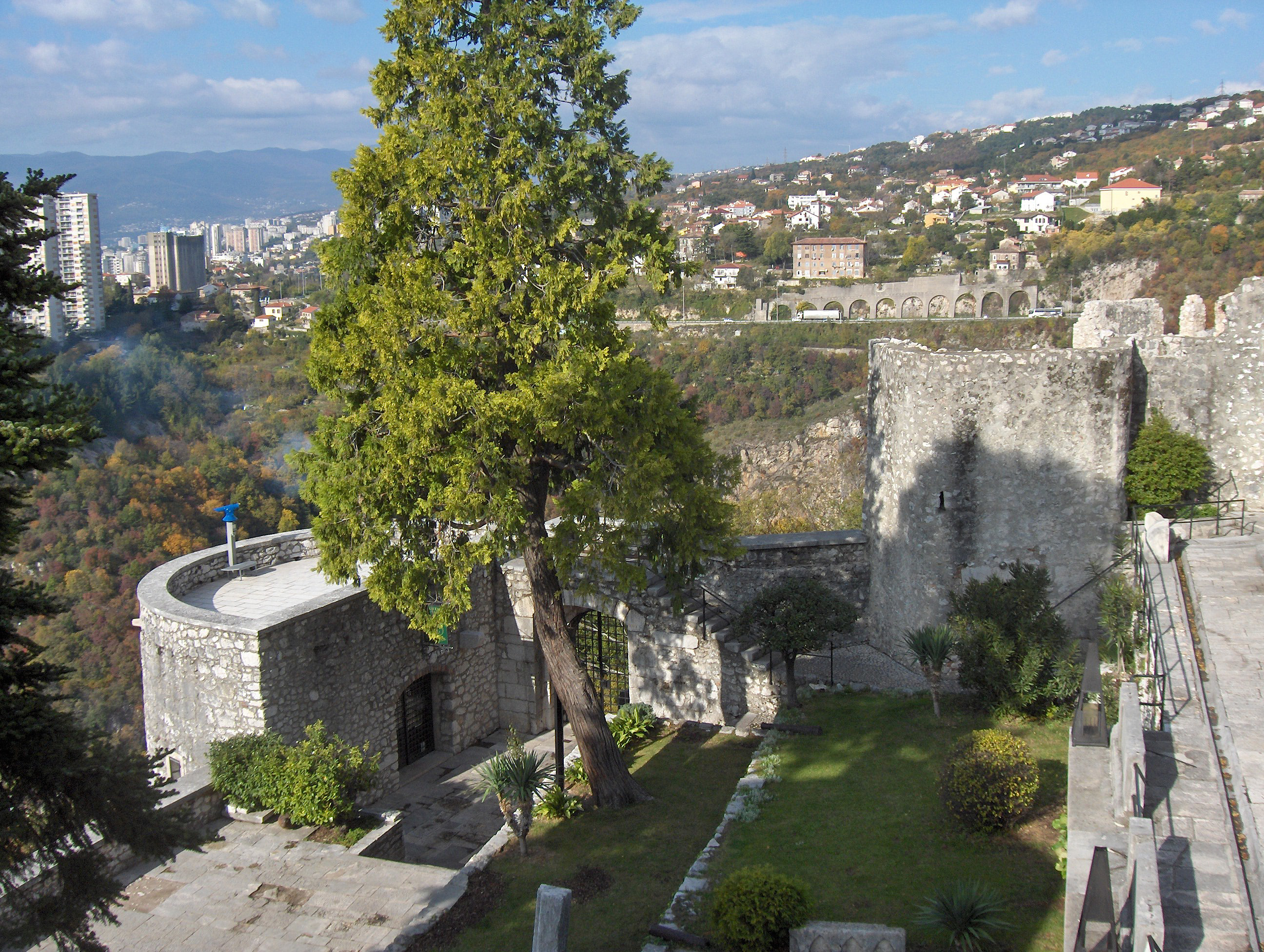
View of Rijeka from Trsat Castle

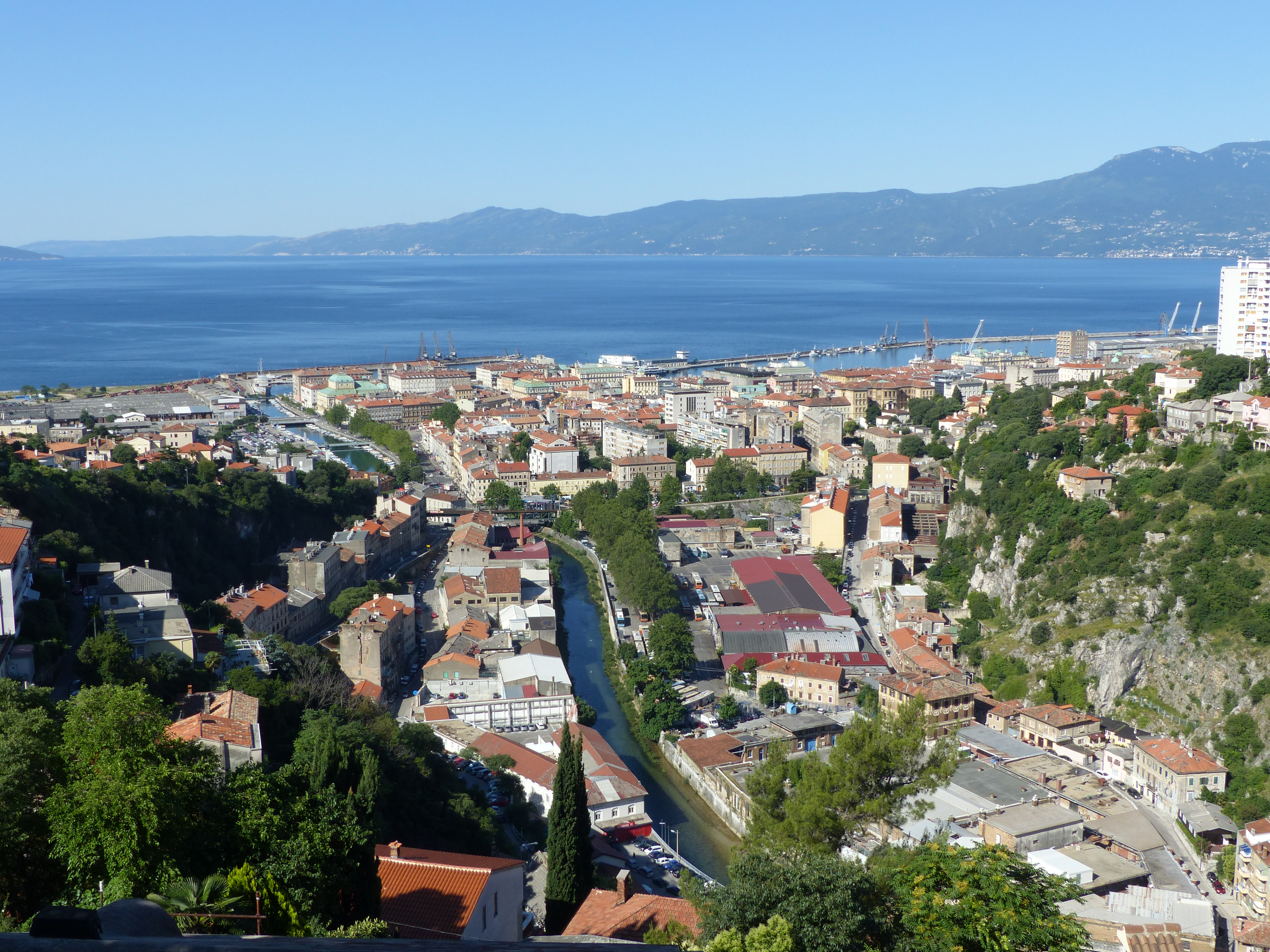
Rijeka as seen from Trsat Castle

Trsat (Italian: Tersatto, Latin: Tarsatica) is part of the city of Rijeka, Croatia, with a historic castle or fortress in a strategic location and several historic churches, in one of which the Croatian noble Prince Vuk Krsto Frankopan is buried. Trsat is a steep hill, 138 m high, rising over the gorge of the Rječina river, about a kilometre away from the sea; strategically significant from the earliest times right up to the 17th century, it is today a major Christian pilgrimage centre and home to a statue of Pope John Paul II who came to Trsat as a Pilgrim in 2003. Today, the University of Rijeka's newly constructed campus lies in the western part of Trsat.

== History ==
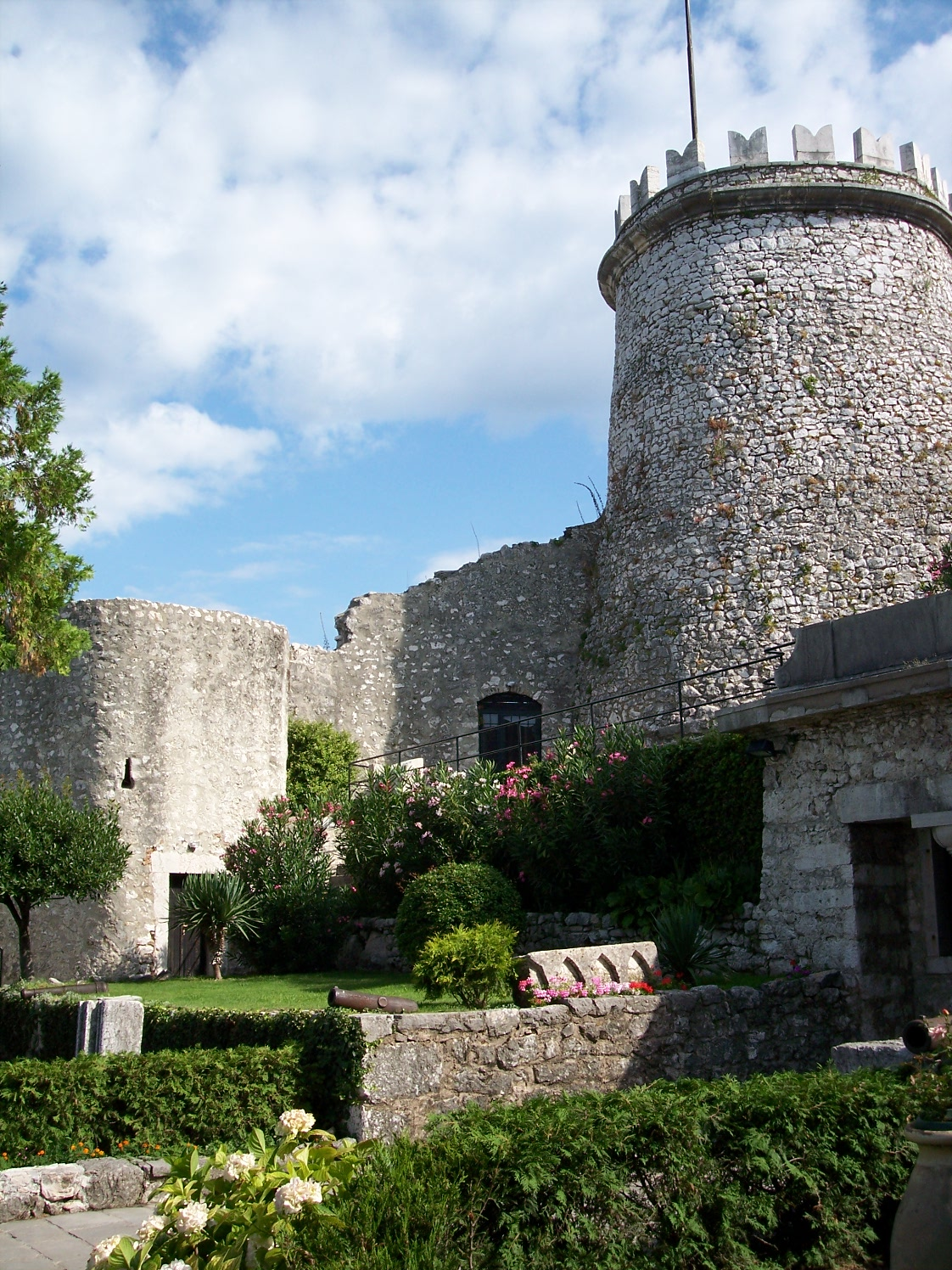
Hill fort in Trsat district

In the time before the Illyrians there was a fortified settlement and then the Iapodian fortress of Tarsatica. Following this there was a Roman looking point, and from the 13th century it was the property of the Counts of Krk. Later it belonged to the Frankopans. Together with Vinodol, the Croatian-Hungarian King Andrija II presented Trsat to Vid II of Krk.

Towards the end of the 15th century the Habsburgs ruled Trsat and, even though it belonged to Croatia and the Frankopans, would not give it up because of its excellent position for the protection of Rijeka. Trsat was first mentioned on 22 February 1481 in a document freeing the citizens of Grič from tariffs in Trsat and elsewhere.

The inhabitants of Trsat and Rijeka waged their fiercest battles with the Venetians in 1508, while in 1527 the Turks made inroads into the city for a short time.

In the 16th century, Trsat was more often in Habsburg than in Frankopan hands, and was mainly ruled by the Captains of Rijeka or Senj or leaseholds. After the execution of Fran Krsto Frankopan in 1671 following the Zrinski-Frankopan conspiracy proposed by Petar Zrinski, the Habsburgs took Trsat over completely. It was attached for a short time to the state of Severin, and in 1778 Maria Theresa placed it under the municipality of Bakar, where it remained, with a short break during the Napoleonic Wars, until 1874 when the community of Trsat was founded.

Trsat was an extremely patriotic Croatian town, and, together with Sušak, demonstrated its attachment to its mother country at every opportunity, and its independence from Rijeka, which was part of Hungary. The centre of political and cultural life in Trsat was the Croatian Reading Room, founded in 1877, with many cultural, educational and sports societies. Many memorial inscriptions and monuments bear witness to the resistance by the people of Trsat and Sušak to Italian and German occupation, a mortuary made according to plans by the architect Zdenko Sila and Zdenko Kolacio being outstanding.

== Demographics ==
In 1895, the obćina of Trsat (court at Sušak), with an area of 20 square kilometres (7.7 mi^{2}), belonged to the kotar of Sušak (Bakar court and electoral district) in the županija of Modruš-Rieka (Ogulin court and financial board). There were 1281 houses, with a population of 8327 (highest in Sušak kotar). Its 18 villages and 11 hamlets were divided for taxation purposes into 5 porezne obćine, under the Bakar office.

== Important Sites ==
=== Trsat Castle ===
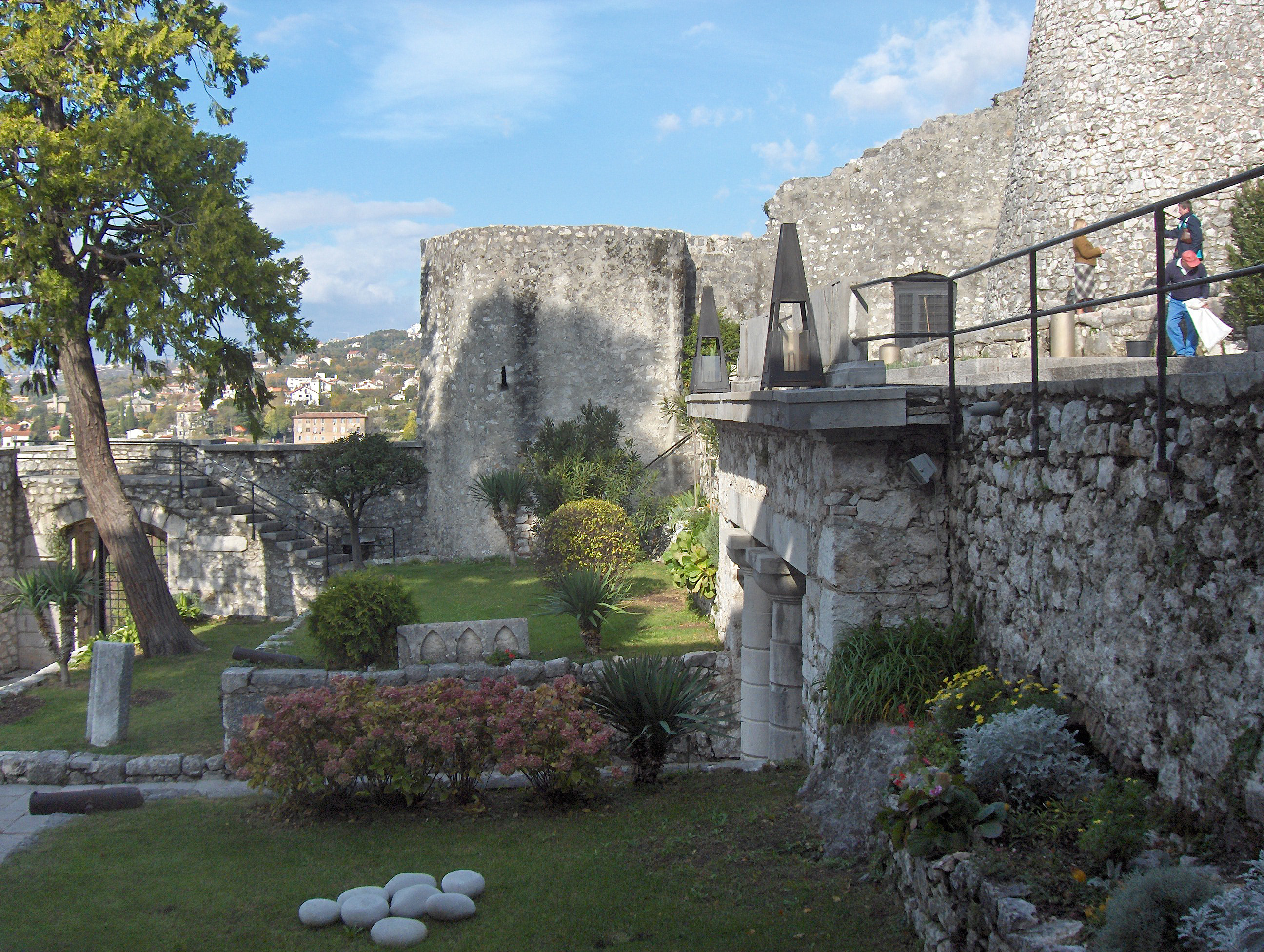
Trsat Castle – detail

Trsat Castle stands on the site of an old Roman fortress and was built in the first half of the 13th century by the Frankopan Princes of Krk. From the beginning of the 15th century it had a succession of lords, but was most often owned by the Habsburgs. In 1528 the Senj Capitan Gašpar Raab bought the castle and adapted and greatly strengthened it. Once the danger from the Turks had passed at the end of the 17th century, and fire arms had come into use, Trsat fortress was less important and was left allowed to fall into ruins, a process which was completed by an earthquake in 1750. Count Laval Nugent, marshal and military commander of the Austrian coastal area, bought the ruins off the city, for an annual payment of one florint and had it restored in a Romantic Classicist-Biedermeier-style. He engaged the Venetian builder Paronuzzio and repaired the towers, decorated the interior and even built himself a mausoleum in the style of a Doric temple with four marble pillars supporting the facade. After his death his impoverished descendants deserted the castle and it once again fell into ruin until 1960. Since then it has been restored and enriched by the presence of art exhibitions, summer concerts and theatrical performances.

=== The Shrine of Our Lady of Trsat ===
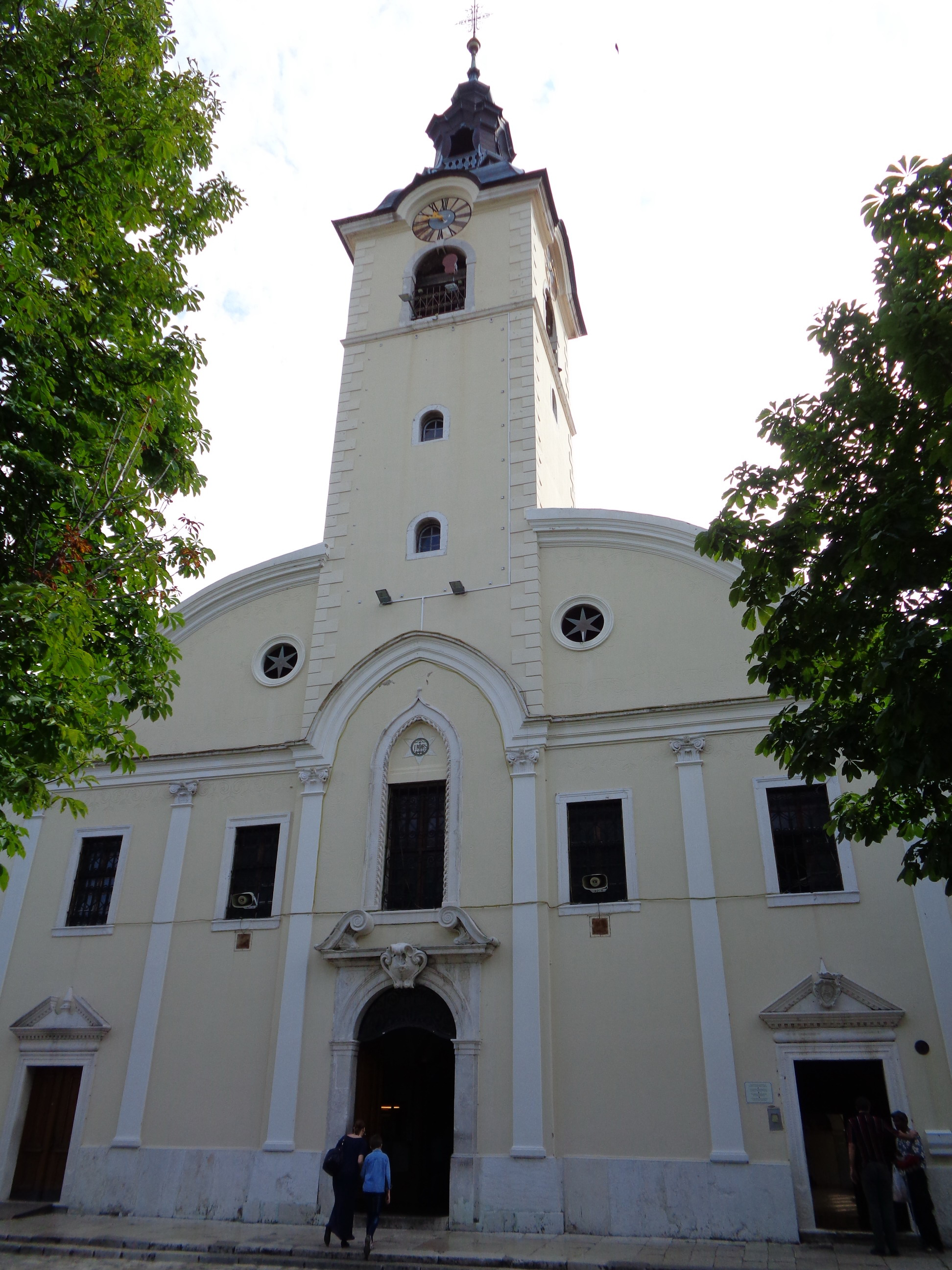
Church of Our Lady of Trsat facade

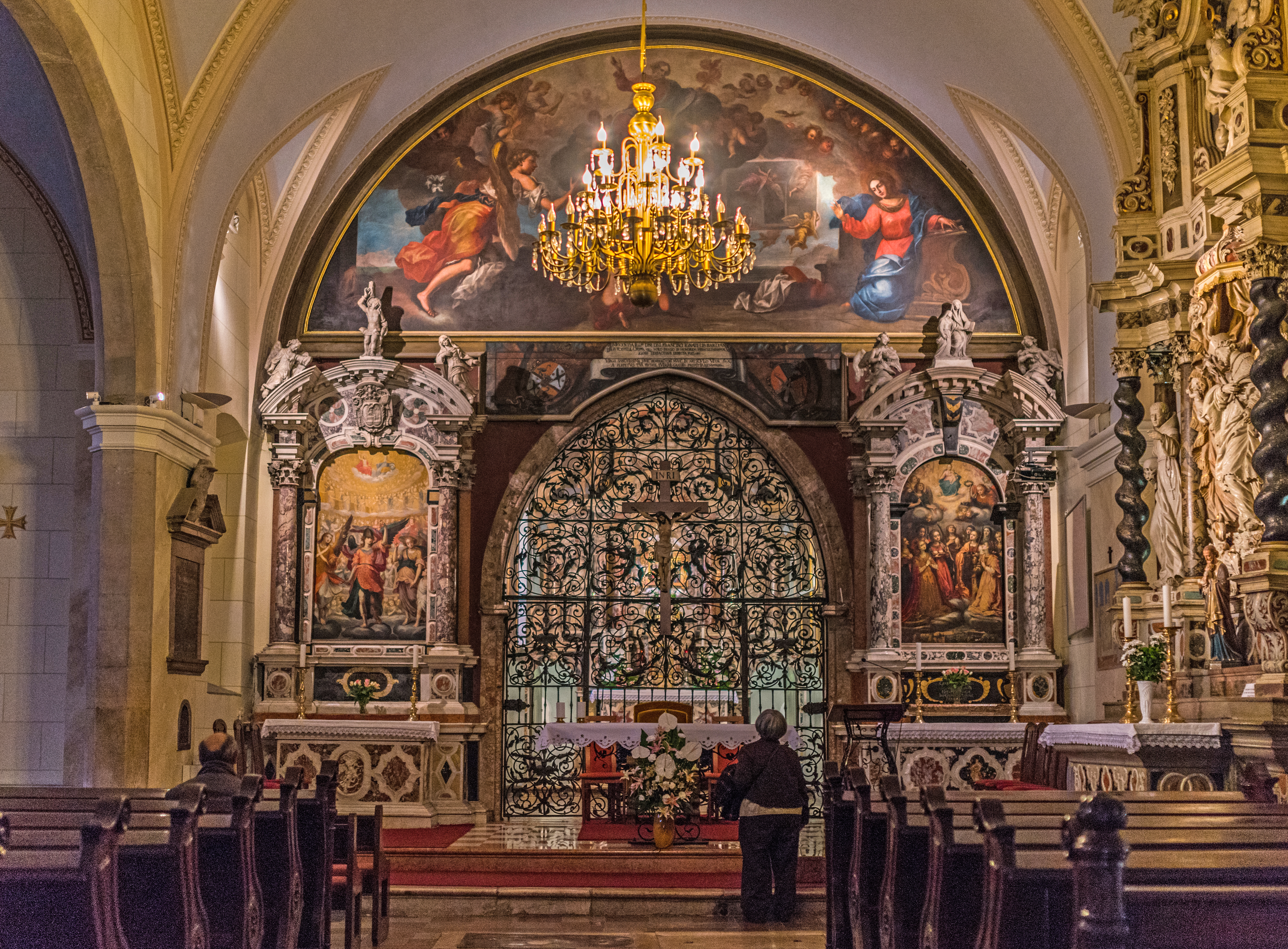
Interior of Our Lady of Trsat

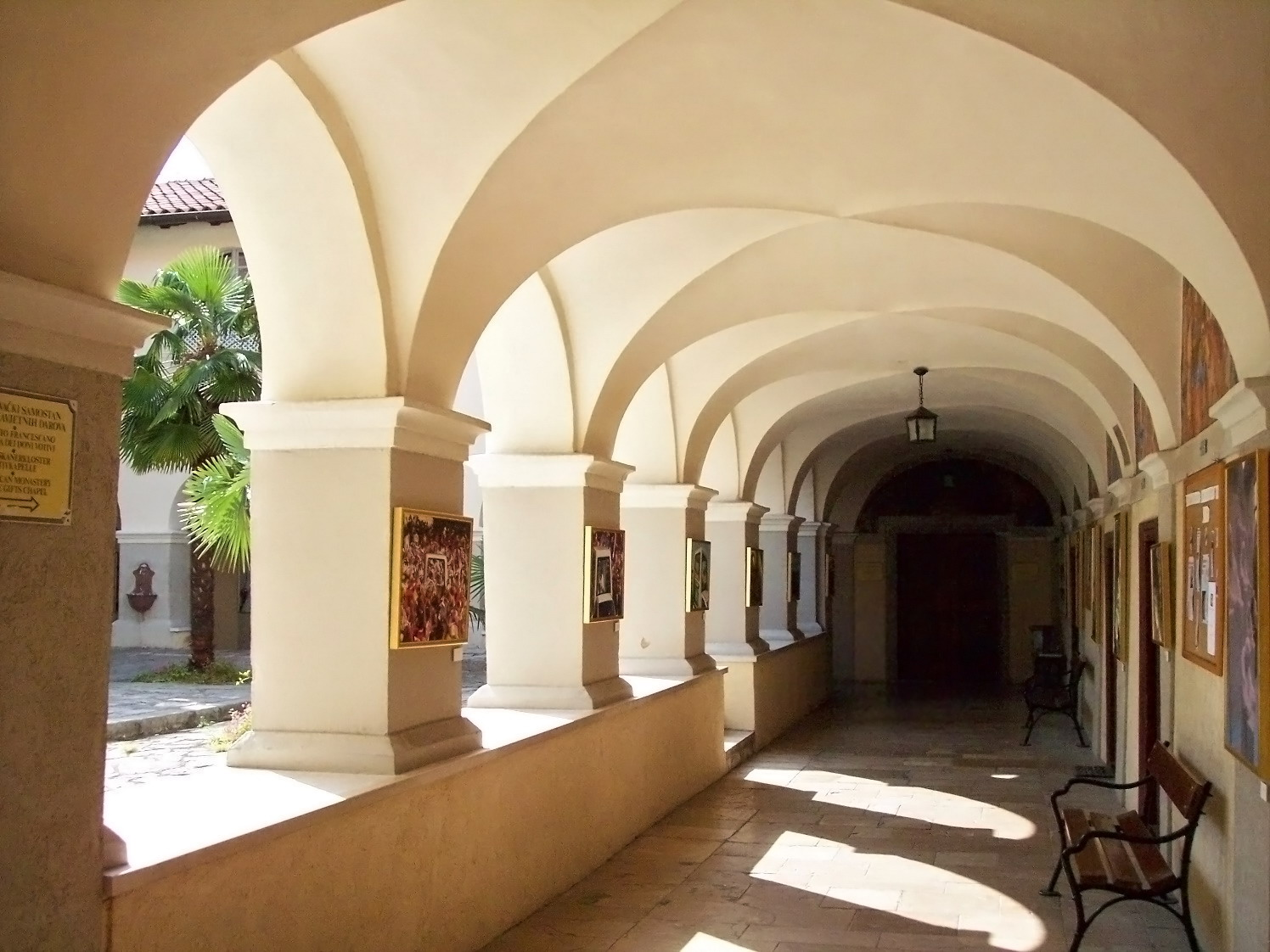
Church of Our Lady's courtyard

The Shrine of Our Lady of Trsat (Croatian: Gospa Trsatska) is a church on the flat area at the top of Trsat hill and the subject of a legend dating from the 13th century. In May 1291 Mary's house in Nazareth is said to have appeared here, moved by angels from Nazareth, then mysteriously disappeared later, to be discovered in Italy, in Loreto, where it still stands today as a shrine. According to one version the Holy House was brought from the Holy Land by the Crusaders. Nikola Frankopan sent a delegation to Nazareth to measure the foundations as he had presumably only the stones in his possession and not the whole walls. He rebuilt the Holy House and the Frankopan Family then gave the Holy House to the Pope and, as the nearest Papal lands were near Ancona, the House was shipped there and placed in Loreto. Tradition ascribes the building of the church to Nikola I Frankopan (1307–1343) in 1291; it was extended and added to by his descendants. In 1453 Prince Martin Frankopan added on a nave to house a painting of Mary, believed to have been donated by Pope Urban V in 1367 and thought to have been painted by Luke, and built a monastery alongside the church, occupied since 1468 by the Franciscans who are the guardians of the cult, which attracts many of the faithful. In 1644 a new nave was added to the church, which was extended and redone in Baroque style by the contributions of the members of congregation and Princes Frankopans. In 1691 the monastery was rebuilt after a fire and the complete reconstruction of the interior of the cathedral began, which was completed by the mid of the 18th century. In 1726 a new sanctuary above the crypt was built, giving the entire space luxury of ceiling decoration.

A new artistic contribution to the church was made by Vladimir Kirin (1894–1963), with five pictures on the greenish marble slabs with which the shrine is lined, and another by Ivo Režek (1898–1979) who portrayed the 14 stations of the cross in fresco technique. One of the guardians of the Trsat monastery was the outstanding Glagolitic expert and writer of books in Croatian, Latin and Italian, Franjo Glavinič (1585–1652).

=== The Trsat stairway ===
The Trsat stairway begins on the banks of the Rječina, beside a bank building, and leads up to the plateau at 138 m above sea level. There are 561 steps in all, and they were built for pilgrims on their way to the votive church. Work was started on them in 1531 by Petar Kružić, hero of battles against the Turks, who built the lower part of the stairway, later expanded to 538 steps. The Baroque entrance hall in the form of a triumphal arch was built in the first half of the 18th century, and the votive chapels on the level ground near the church by the steps, between the 15th and 18th centuries, one chapel each century.

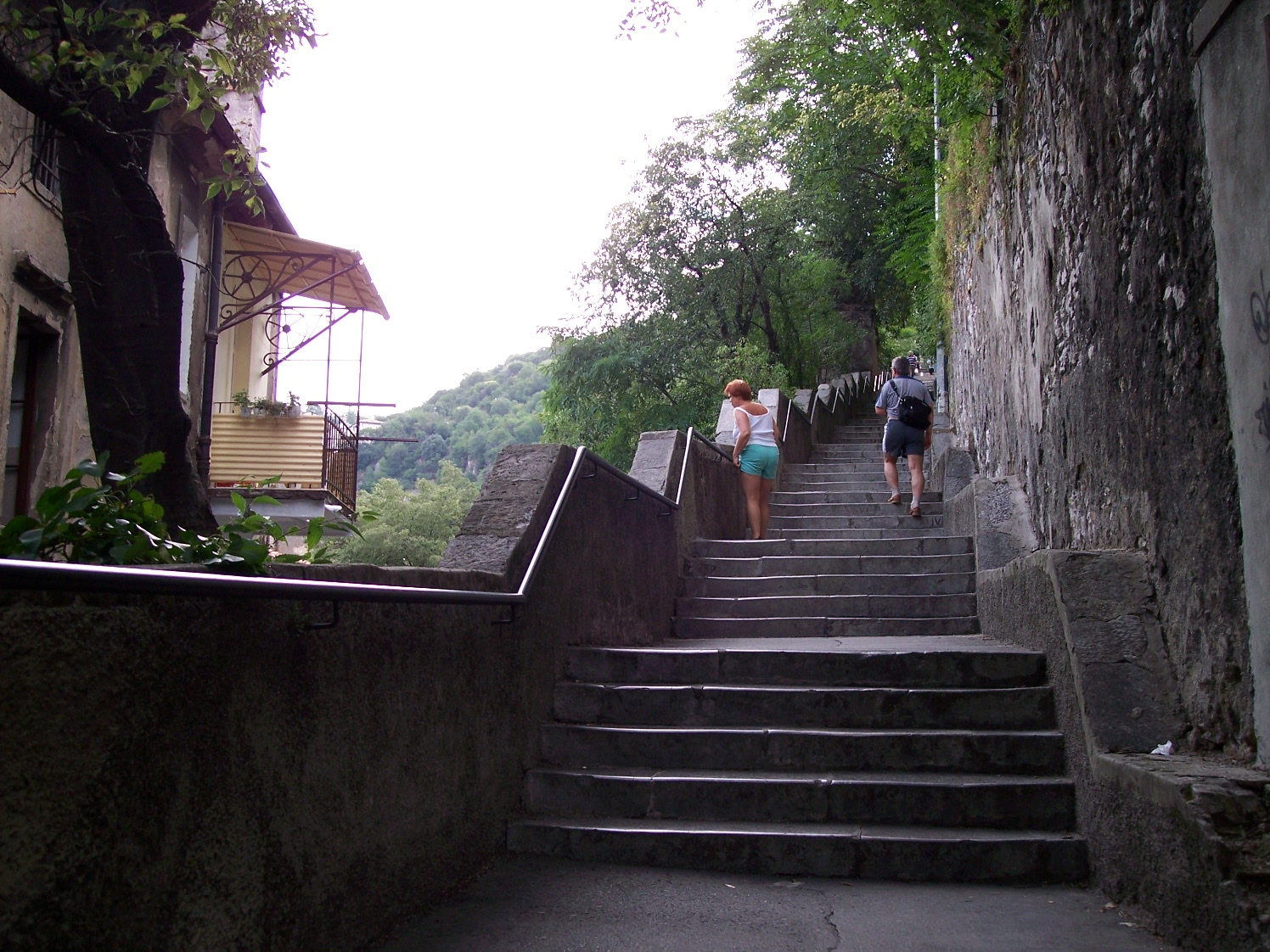
Petar Kružić stairway from Rijeka to Trsat

== Education ==
=== University of Rijeka campus ===
In 2003, construction of the University of Rijeka's new Trsat campus began on the site of a former army barracks on the western edge of the district, bordering the nearby district of Vežica, encompassing departments and faculties which were previously scattered around the city of Rijeka. Opening in 2008, the campus now includes the Faculties of Applied Arts, Philosophy, Informatics, Mathematics and Civil Engineering, along with the Departments of Biotechnology and Physics.

=== Primary education ===
Trsat contains two primary schools (Osnovne škole): OŠ "Trsat", near the Church of Our Lady of Trsat, and OŠ "Vladimir Gortan", near the University of Rijeka campus.

== Gallery ==
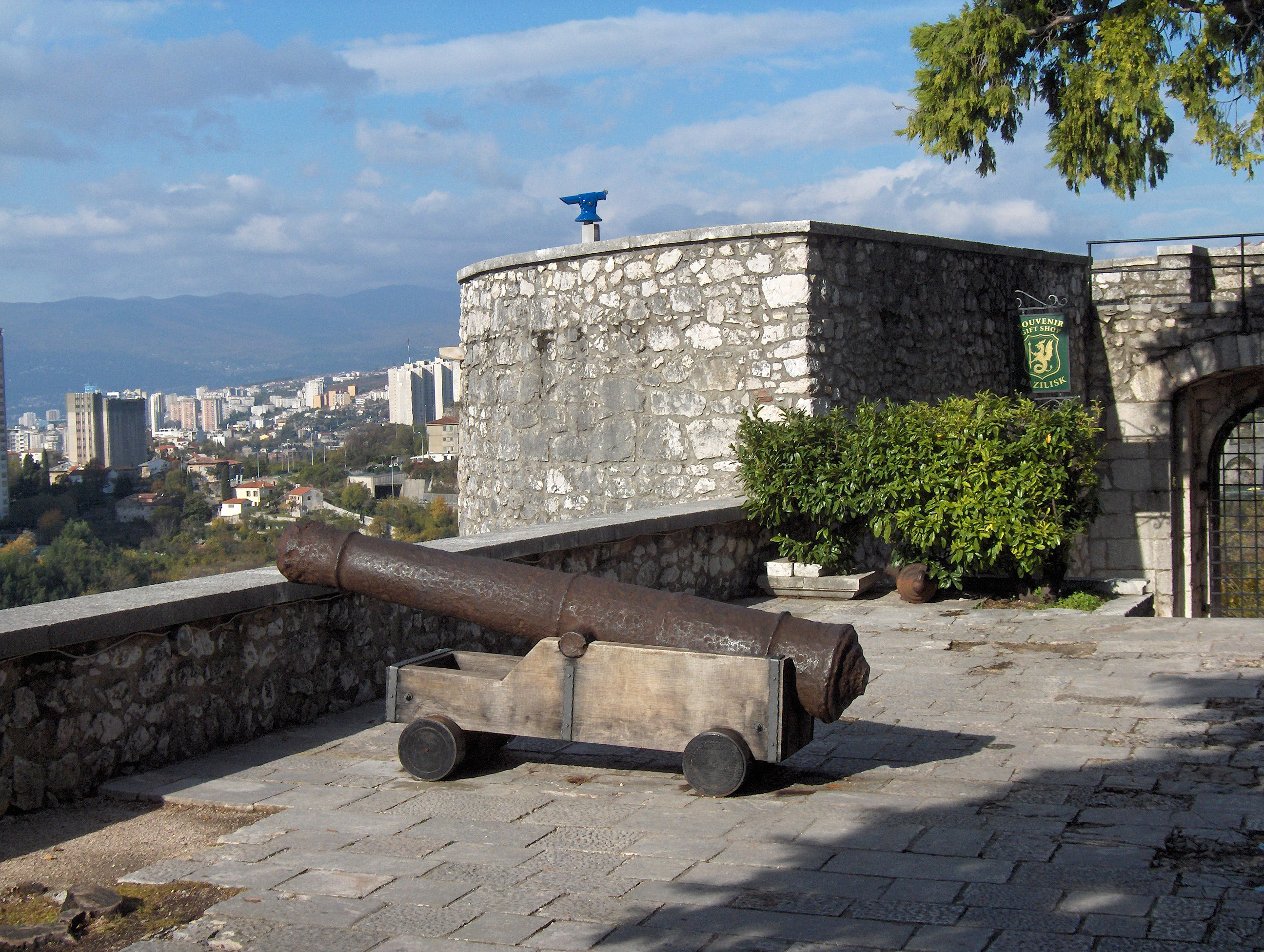
Old muzzle-loading gun at Trsat Castle

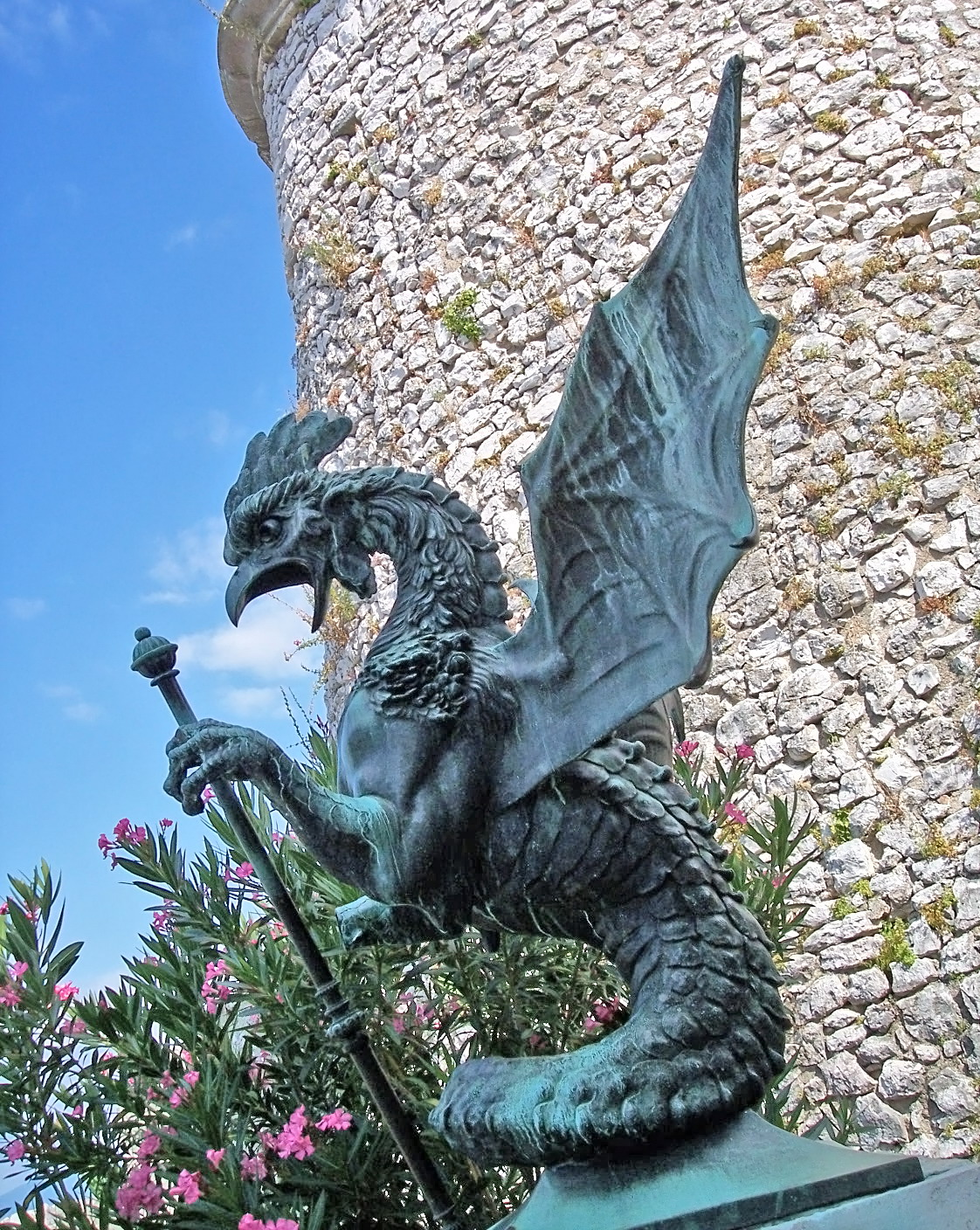
Basilisk statue in courtyard

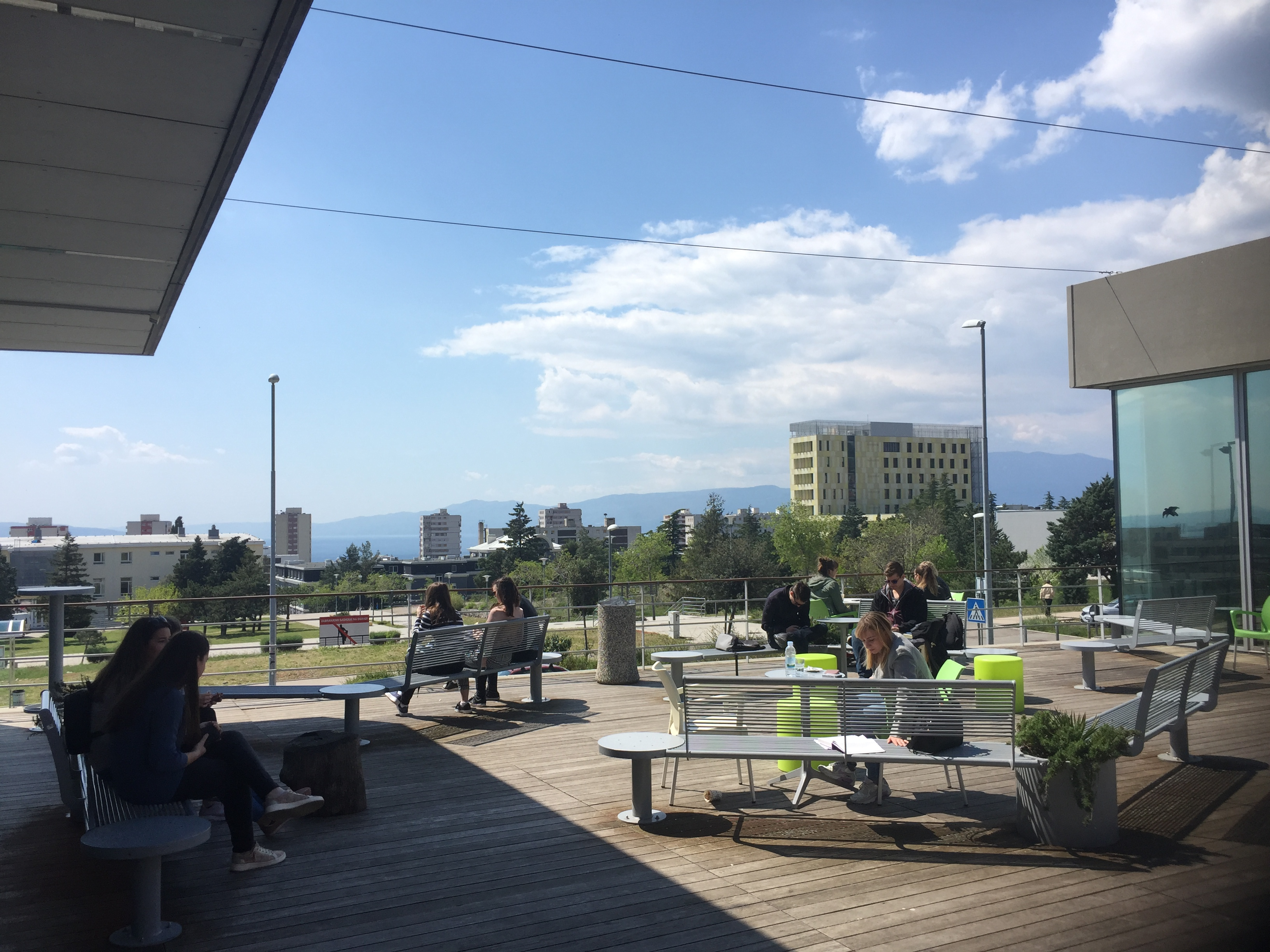
Students socialising at the Student Centre on the university campus

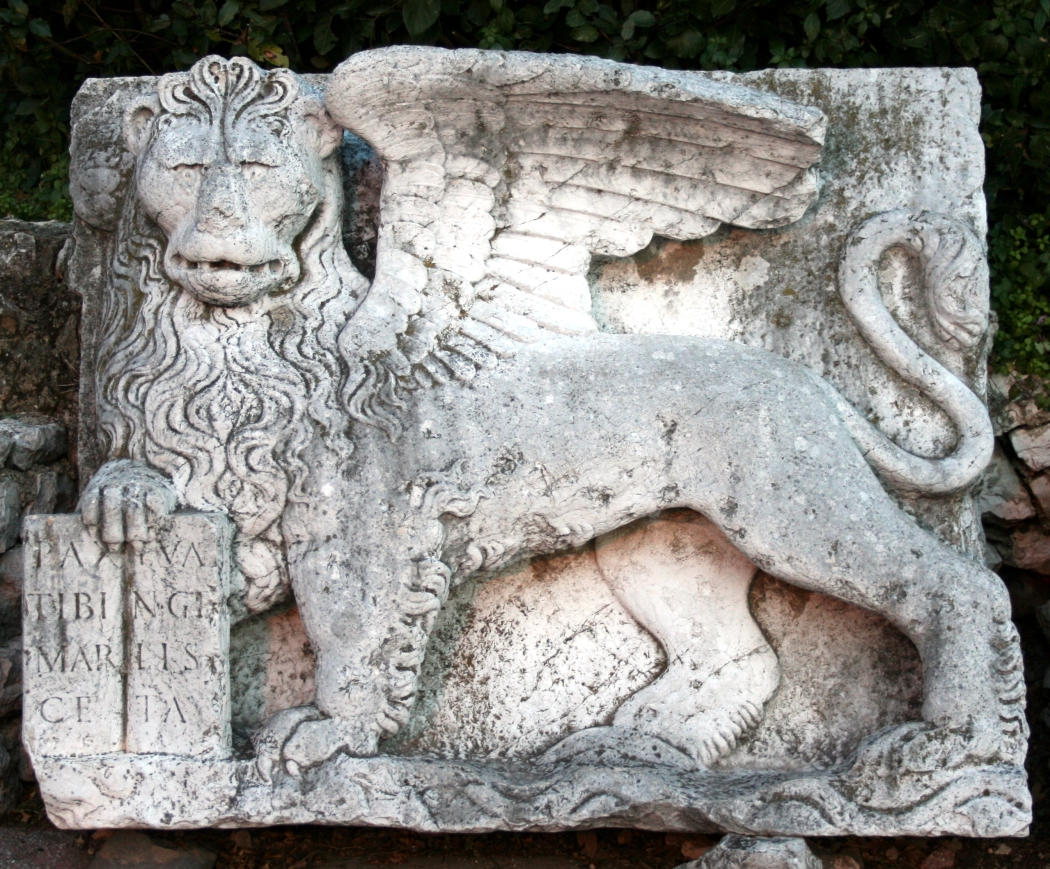
Venetian lion near entrance

== See also ==
- Kvarner
- Adriatic
