= Vučevica =

Vučevica may refer to the following places:

- Vučevica, Croatia, a village near Klis
- Vučevica, Serbia, a village near Vladimirci
