= Battle of Klis (1583) =

- Part of Ottoman–Habsburg wars
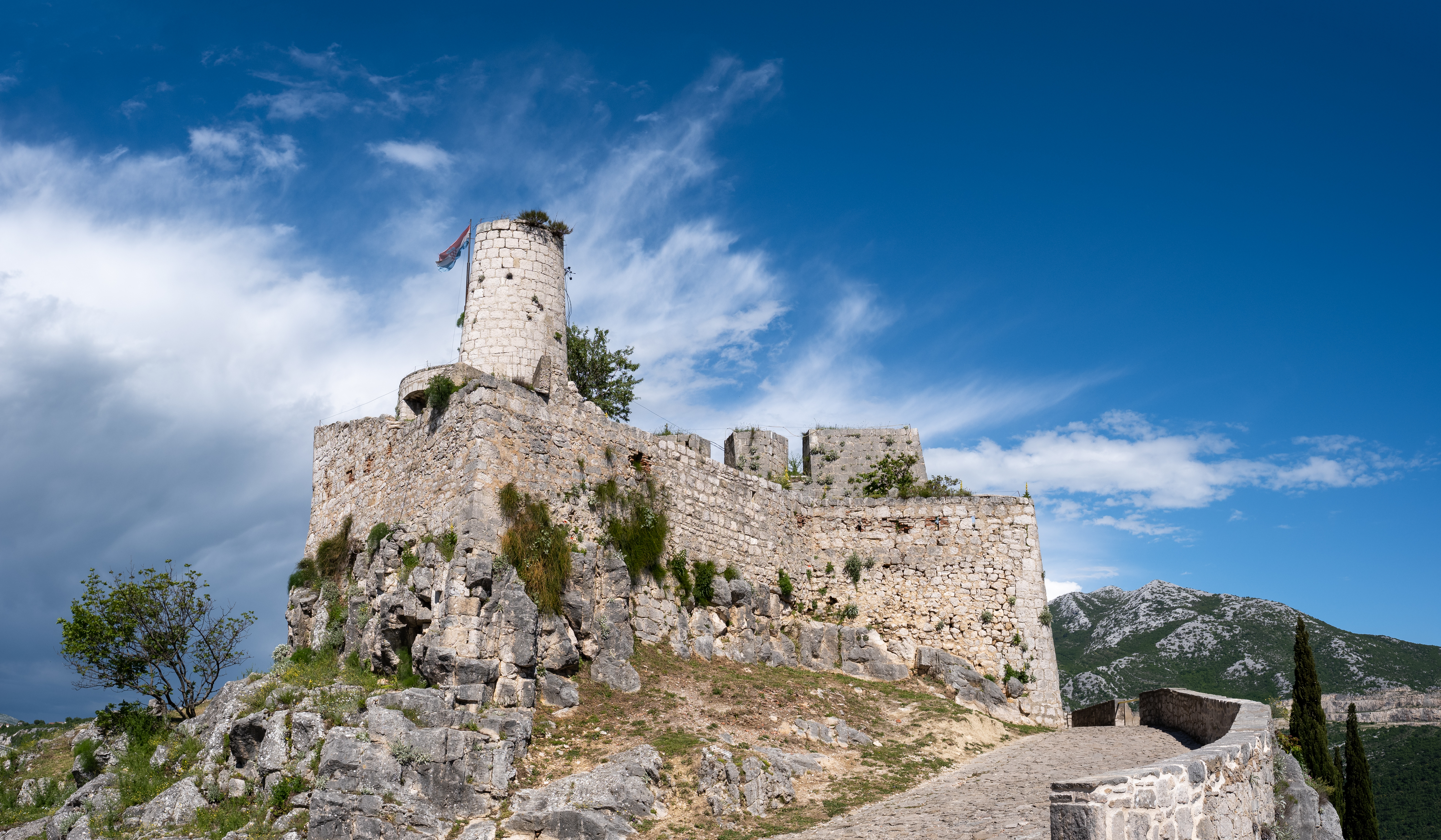
- Klis fortress
Date	1–2 January 1583
Location	Klis, Croatia
Result	Ottoman victory

Belligerents
Habsburg monarchy: Kingdom of Croatia	Ottoman Empire

Commanders and leaders
(Habsburg monarchy) Juraj Daničić (Habsburg monarchy) Lubin Milićić (Habsburg monarchy) Angelo Trogiranin	Unknown

Strength
Unknown	Unknown

Casualties and losses
Heavy	100 killed

The Battle of Klis was a military engagement between the Habsburgs and the Ottomans at Klis. The Uskoks under the authority of the Habsburgs attempted to capture the city of Klis from the Ottomans; however, their attempt was repulsed.

== Background ==
By 1580, the papal legate in Germany, Malaspina, handed Charles II, Archduke of Austria, a memorandum requesting him to fortify some cities on Austro-Ottoman borders and launch a Christian coalition against the Ottomans. The Pope promised to finance the campaign. The Uskoks from Senj would invade Bosnia and harass the Ottomans. The Pope would work on a coalition between Germany, Russia, Spain, Venice, and other Italian principalities. A papal confidant, Franciscan Angelo Trogiranin made an agreement with the archduke that he would capture Klis, Solin, and Sinj from the Ottomans and supply them until he sends the main army to reinforce them.

The archduke and the pope promised to reward the Uskoks for the venture. The Uskoks had to wait for two years until a good opportunity came. Finally, in late 1582, when a bribed guard of Klis had Angelo as the prelate of the city. After this, Angelo went to Rijeka and informed the Uskoks.

== Battle ==
In late 1582, the Uskoks were led by Juraj Daničić, Lubin Milićić, and Angelo. They set off from Senj and marched towards Klis. Daničić rode the sea with three ships while the rest marched on land. However, a storm delayed Daničić's sail, forcing the land troops to continue the venture without him. The Uskoks arrived on January 1, 1583. When they attempted to sneak into the city, an Ottoman guard asked them about Angelo and asked them to hand him over only. Since Angelo was not here with them, the Ottomans discovered the plot, and a battle ensued during which the Uskoks were repelled and many of them were killed, while the Ottomans lost 100 men. The next day, Daničić and Angelo arrived in Klis. The Ottomans defeated them and forced them to retreat. Both of them returned to Senj. Around 800 families who previously conspired with the Uskoks escaped to Senj.

== Sources ==
- Marko Perojevic (1936), Klis under Turkish rule (In Croatian).
- Vjekoslav Klaić (1911), History of the Croats: Part 1. The Fourth Era: The Reign of the Habsburg Kings (1527–1740) Book 1. The Era of Kings Ferdinand I, Maximilian and Rudolf (1527–1608) (In Croatian).
