= Jure Radić =

Jure Radić may refer to:

- Jure Radić (priest) (1920–1990), Croatian scientist and priest
- Jure Radić (engineer) (1953–2016), Croatian civil engineer and politician
