= Marija Edita Šolić =

Croatian botanist (1946–2021)

Marija Edita Šolić (26 August 1946 - 31 October 2021), was a Croatian botanist, museum curator and educator. She studied Biokovo's flora and floristic endemism, as well as chorology, systematic-taxonomical issues and conservation possibilities of the Biokovo area.

== Early life and education ==
She was born in Brštanovo near Klis, where she completed elementary school, and in 1963 joined the order of the School Sisters of St. Francis, taking her vows and religious name Edita in 1965. The following year, Šolić went to Franciscan convent in Makarska, where she was employed at the Malacology Museum, becoming Jure Radić's associate. Together they worked on the establishment of the Mountain and the Sea Institute (Croatian: Institut "Planina i more") and forming the malacological collection, collections of fossil mollusks and other invertebrates, as well as live and herbaria plant collections. On 26 September 1972 at the Department of Biology, Faculty of Science, University of Sarajevo she passed an entrance exam, enrolling Environment Conservation study. Šolić graduated biology on 24 August 1980 with thesis “Significant Biokovo plants with special emphasis on their protection” under the supervision of Professor Radomir Lakušić. On 30 May 1986 she successfully defended her master's thesis in ecology “Chorologic-ecological and phenologic-morphological differentiation of Biokovo’s endemic Centaureas from subgenus Acrolophus (Cass.) Dobr.-Kov.”. Šolić acquired her doctoral degree at the Faculty of Science, University of Zagreb on July 14, 1993. with dissertation “Floristic-ecological features of the coastal slopes of Mt Biokovo".

== Professional work ==
During her postgraduate education by working in the Malacology Museum and the Mountain and the Sea Institute she gain knowledge in malacology and museology, advancing to the position of the museum curator. Along with institutional work, she did extensive field researches at Biokovo mountain range. She became the curator of the Herbarium, established in 1963, which was recognized and registered as the Herbarium of the Biokovo Area. She attained the rank of scientific assistant on 17 December 1992 and upon the decision of the Ministry of Science of the Republic of Croatia was entered in the Register of Researchers on 11 February 1993. Her scientific interest included autecology, synecology, as well as malacofauna of the Adriatic Sea. She was member of the editorial board (1983-2001) and journal editor (1997-2001) of Acta Biocovica, as well as an associate at the Institute of Oceanography and Fishery in Split (2002-2010). Sister Šolić was active in popularisation of biosciences, giving lectures to various audiences (from kindergarten to students) and advocating for nature conservation of Mt. Biokovo and the surrounding of Makarska.

== Personal life ==
Her parents Petar and Luca had nine children, Marija being third oldest. During Second World War family moves to Slavonia, where due to hunger their two children died. By returning to Brštanovo, Marija was born, as the oldest of the living children.

Šolić entered monastery of School Sisters of St. Francis in Split on 1 May 1963, starting her novitiate on 8 September 1965, at the feast of Nativity of Mary. She gave temporary vows on 9 September 1966 and lifelong on 25 August 1971.

She died in Split on 31 October 2021 and was buried at the Lovinac cemetery in Split, on 4 November 2021.

== Acknowledgements ==
- Silver Plaque for the exceptional achievements and merits in the promotion of the Croatian economy (Croatian Chamber of Commerce, 1992)
- Award of Biokovo Croatian Mountaineering Association (1996)
- Annual Award and recognition of the achievements in the fields of environment conservation and biological and environmental diversity (1997)
- City of Makarska Award (1998)

== Selected works ==
Book chapters

- Šolić, M.E., 1983: "Poznavanje flore Biokova od Visianija do danas". In: Pavletić, Z., Matković, P., Grubšić, S. (eds.), Zbornik Roberta Visianija Šibenčanina, 349–364. Muzej grada Šibenika, Šibenik.
- Šolić, M.E., 1999: "Prirodna baština - nezaobilazani temelj odgoja i obrazovanja". In: Macan, T. (ed.), Hrvatska i održivi razvitak. Humane i odgojne vrednote. Ministarstvo razvitka i obnove, Zagreb.
- Pustahija, F., Šolić, E.M., Siljak-Yakovlev, S., 2017: "Karyological study of some Mediterranean species from Bosnia and Herzegovina, Croatia and Lebanon". In: Kamari, G., Blanché, C., Siljak-Yakovlev, S. (eds.), Mediterranean chromosome data – 27. Flora Mediterranea 27, 295–301
