= Petar Kružić staircase =

- Interactive map of Petar Kružić staircase
- Coordinates: 45°19′43″N 14°27′07″E

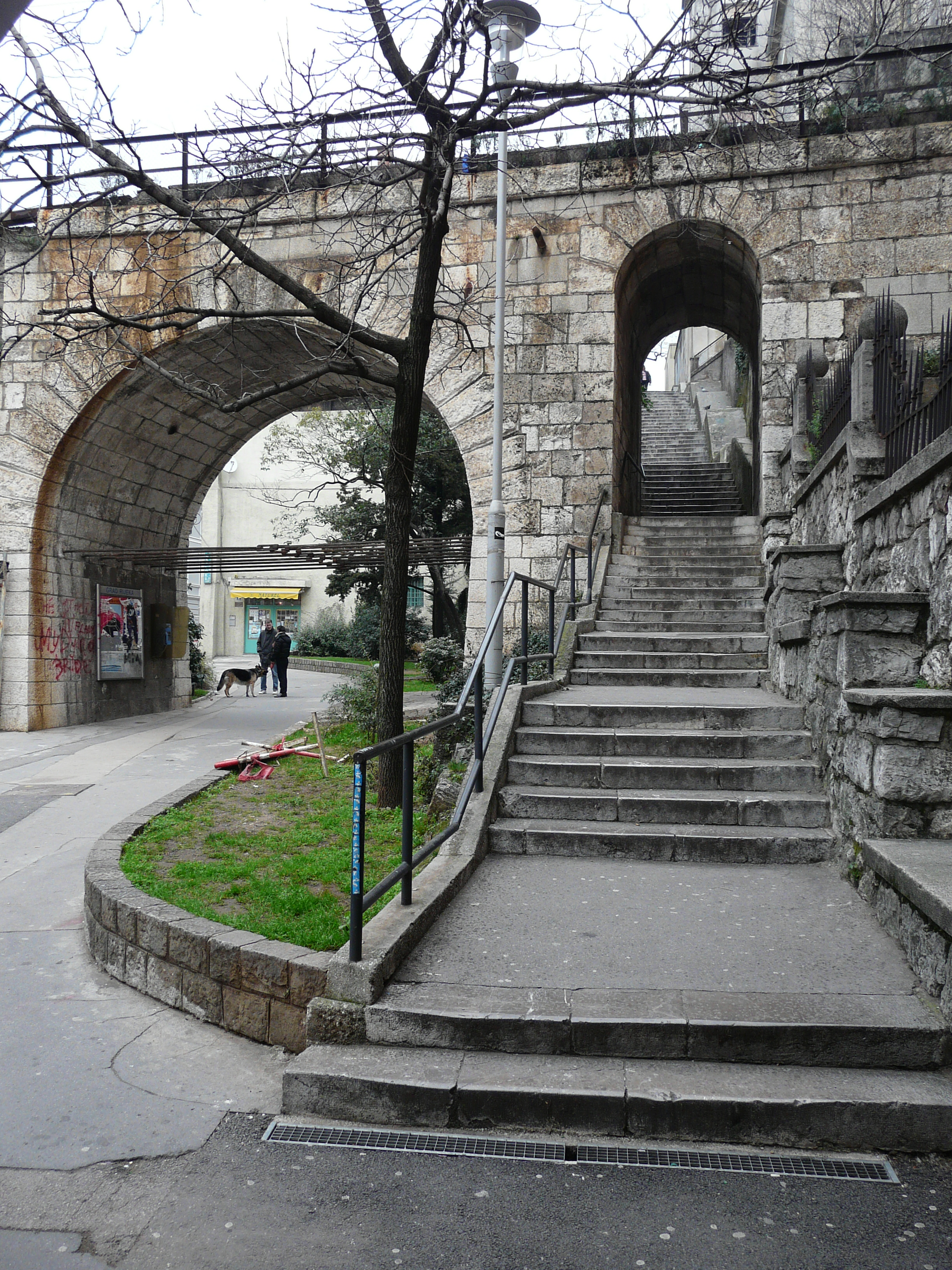
Beginning of Petar Kružić staircase. The railway bridge through this staircase and over the Rječina river was built later than the Petar Kružić staircase.

Petar Kružić stairway, or Petar Kružić staircase, or Trsat stairway (Croatian: Stube Petra Kružića) is the stone stairway in Rijeka, Croatia, that leads from Rijeka to Trsat.

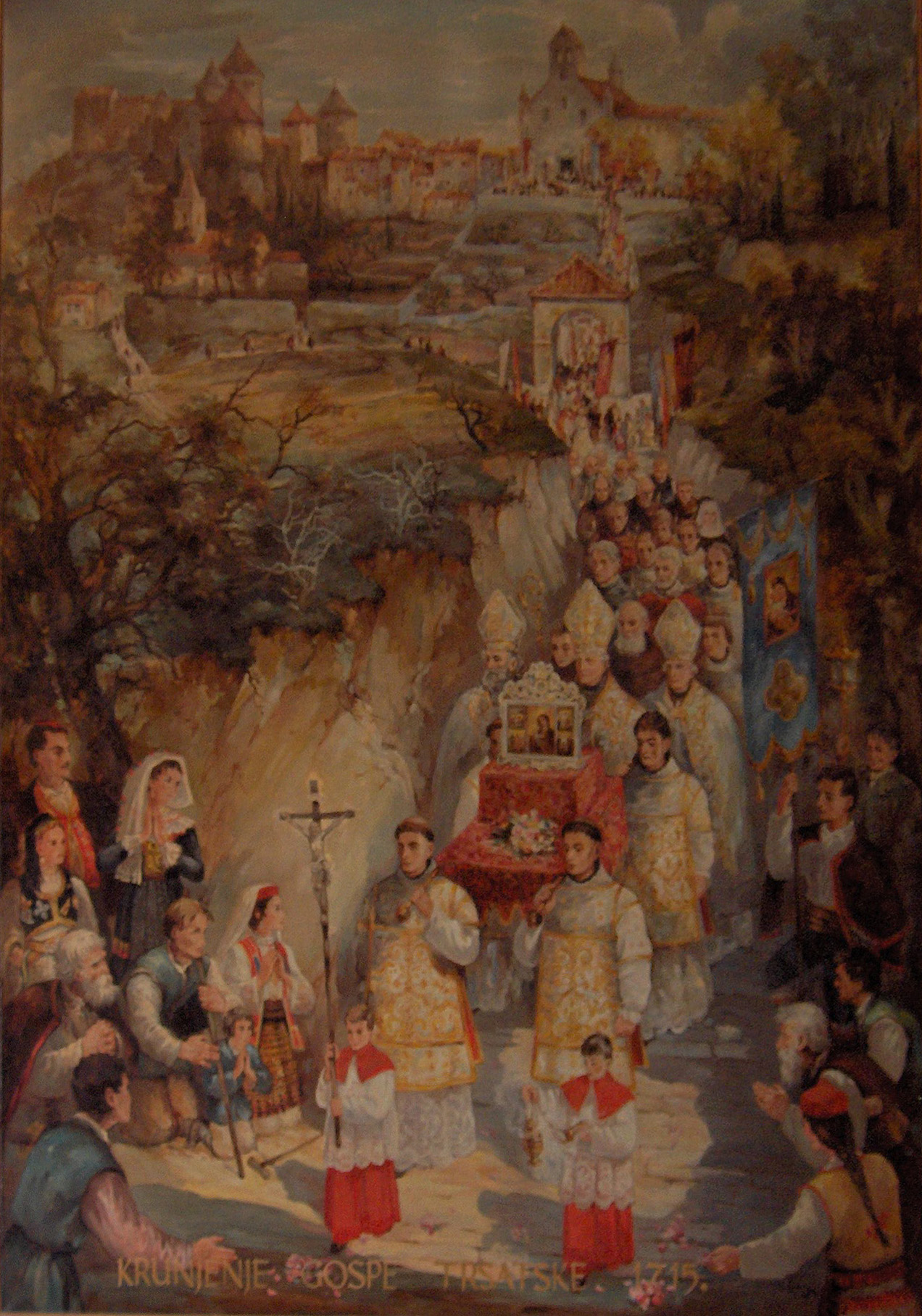
The procession with the icon from Church of Our Lady of Trsat to Rijeka. 1715

The stairway starts from the archway at the Eastern Bank of Rječina river in Rijeka, and leads up to Trsat settlement, which placed on a plateau with altitude of 138 meters from sea level. The stairway consists of 561 stone steps and was built for the pilgrims as the road to the Church of Our Lady of Trsat.

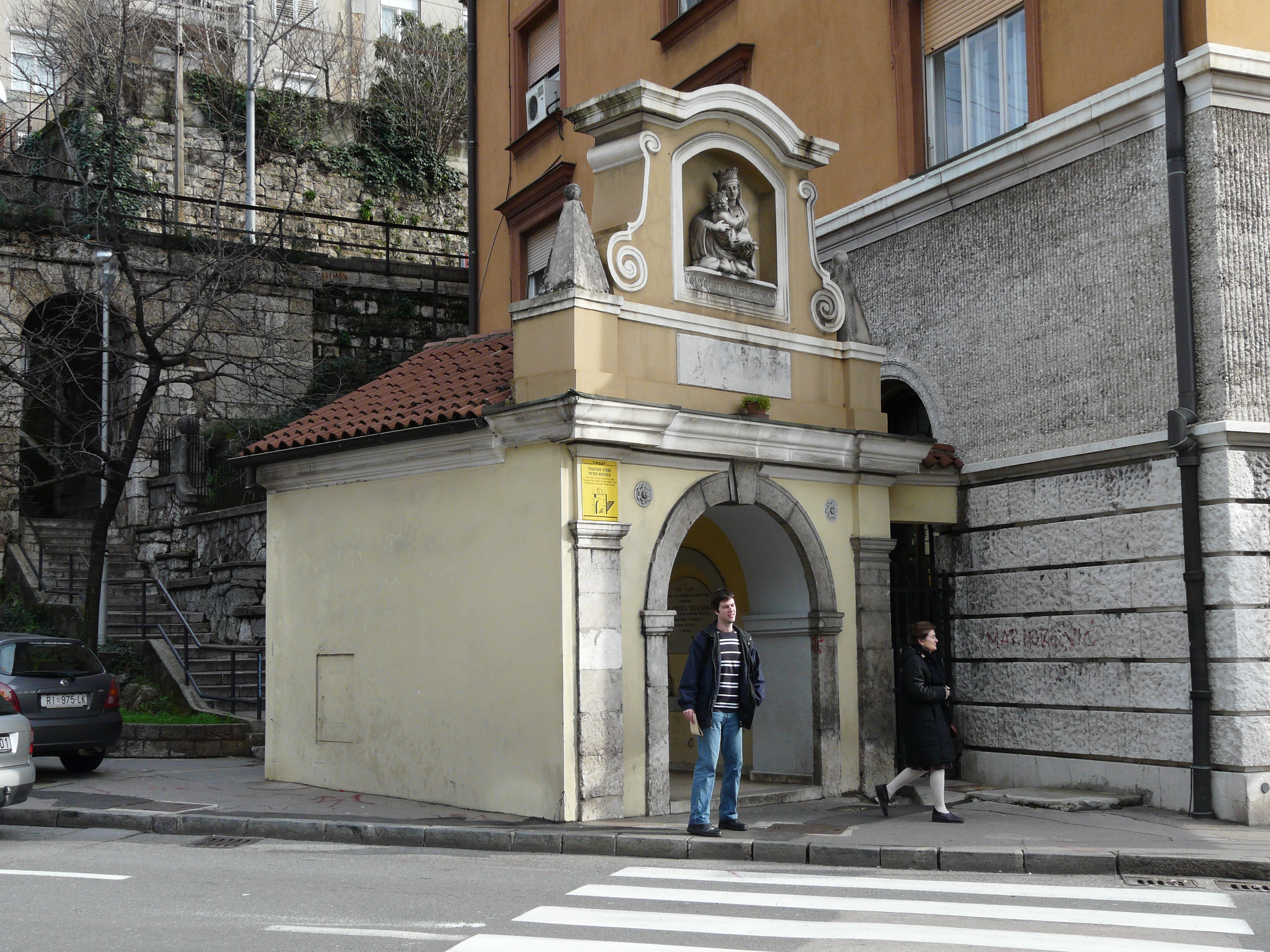
The baroque chapel in Rijeka as the beginning of Petar Kružić stairway.

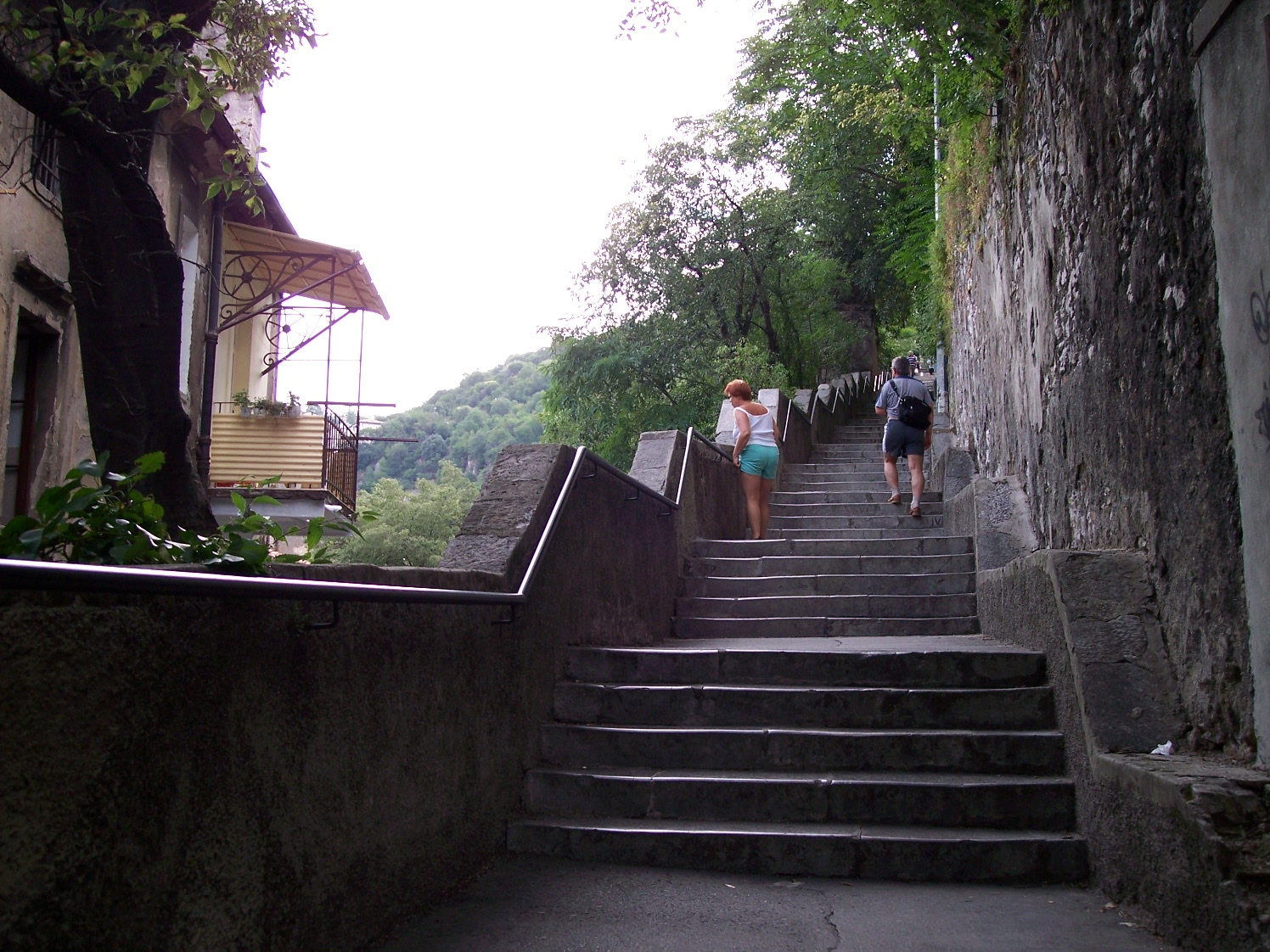
Middle part of Petar Kružić stairway.

The construction of the votive stairway was begun in 1531 with the Croatian warlord captain Petar Kružić, who excelled in the battles with the Turks. He built the lower part of the staircase way leading to the Basilica of Notre-Dame of Trsat, which today is the Church of Our Lady of Trsat.

One of the votive chapels along this stairway was built in the 15th century and another one in the 18th century.

== The baroque chapel and legend ==
The porch at the foot of the stairway leading to Trsat has a statue of "Virgin with Child" dating from 1745. There is a legend about the Trsat stairway. It says that the Franciscans made a deal with the Devil: if he makes a stairway, he will have a soul who climbs the stairway first. After some deliberation, the Devil accepted. Once he finished the work, the Devil waited for the victim. However, the Franciscans let a goat climb the stairway. The Devil was so enraged that he mixed the steps, so that nobody had been able to count them to this day! The legend is based on the fact that the stairway was extended on several occasions.

When it was first built in 1531 by Petar Kružić, the captain of the Uskoks, there were about a hundred steps. Later the stairway was extended up to 561 steps.

A unique experience is to climb the Trsat steps in the procession on the Feast of the Assumption. Even today, some pilgrims practise the ancient votive tradition of climbing the steps on their knees.
