= Petar Kružić =

Croatian and Uskoks military officer (died 1537)

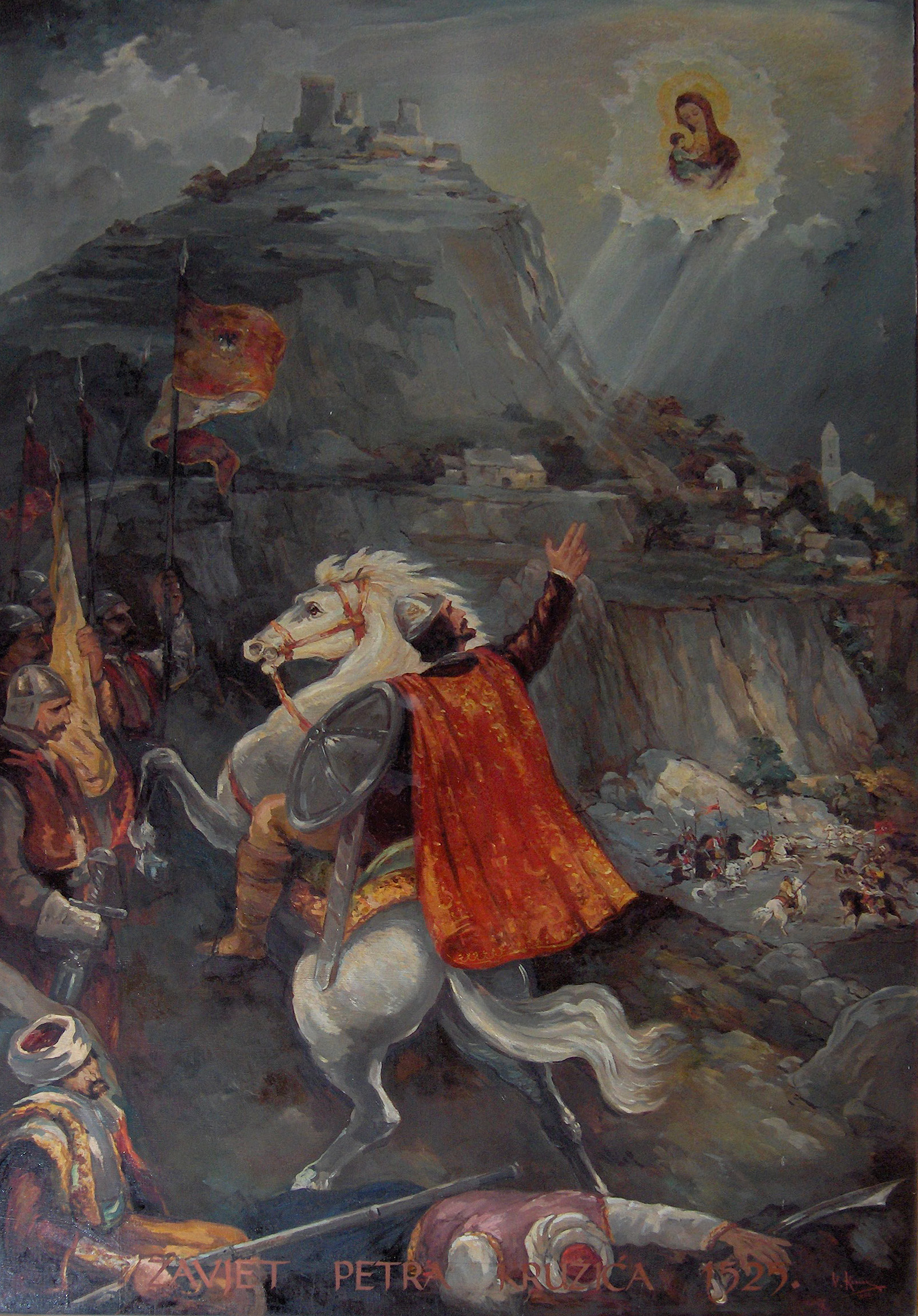
- Petar Kružić fighting the Ottomans, painted by Josip Horvat Međimurec

Personal details
- Born: cca. 1490
- Died: 12 March 1537 (aged 46–47) Klis, Kingdom of Croatia, Habsburg monarchy
- Resting place: Church of Our Lady, Trsat, Croatia
- Spouse: Jerolima Kružić (nee. Vragović)
- Children: Franjo; Ivan

Military service
- Allegiance: Kingdom of Croatia; Habsburg Kingdom of Croatia
- Battles/wars: Siege of Klis

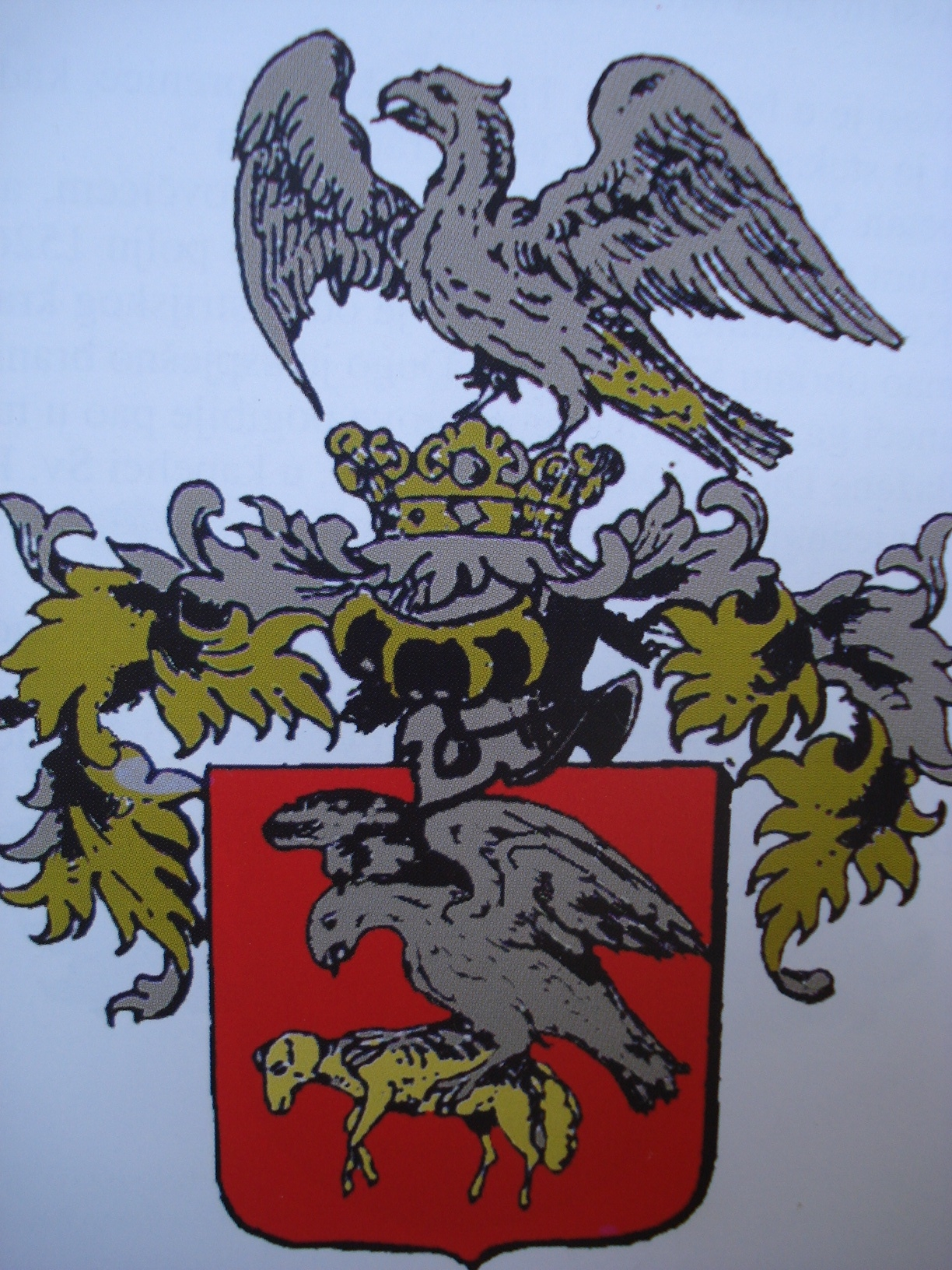
Kružić family coat of arms

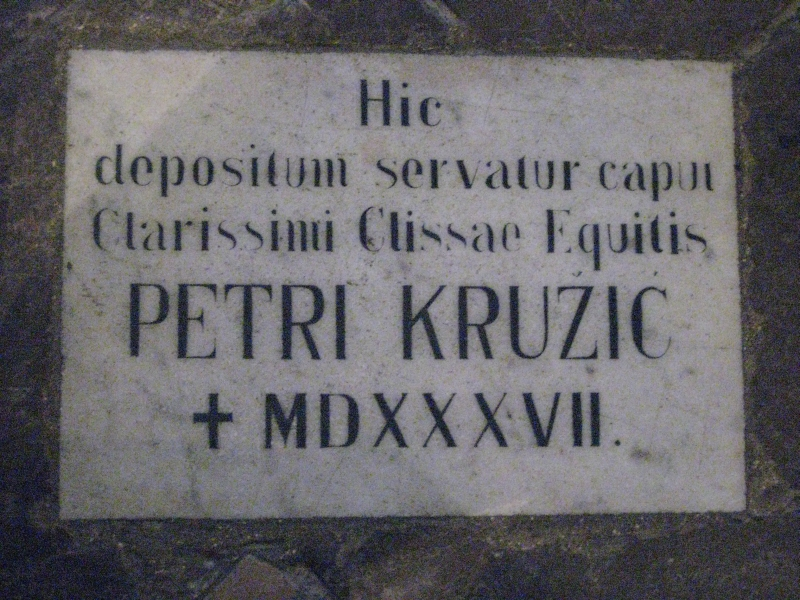
Petar Kružić's grave plaque in Trsat

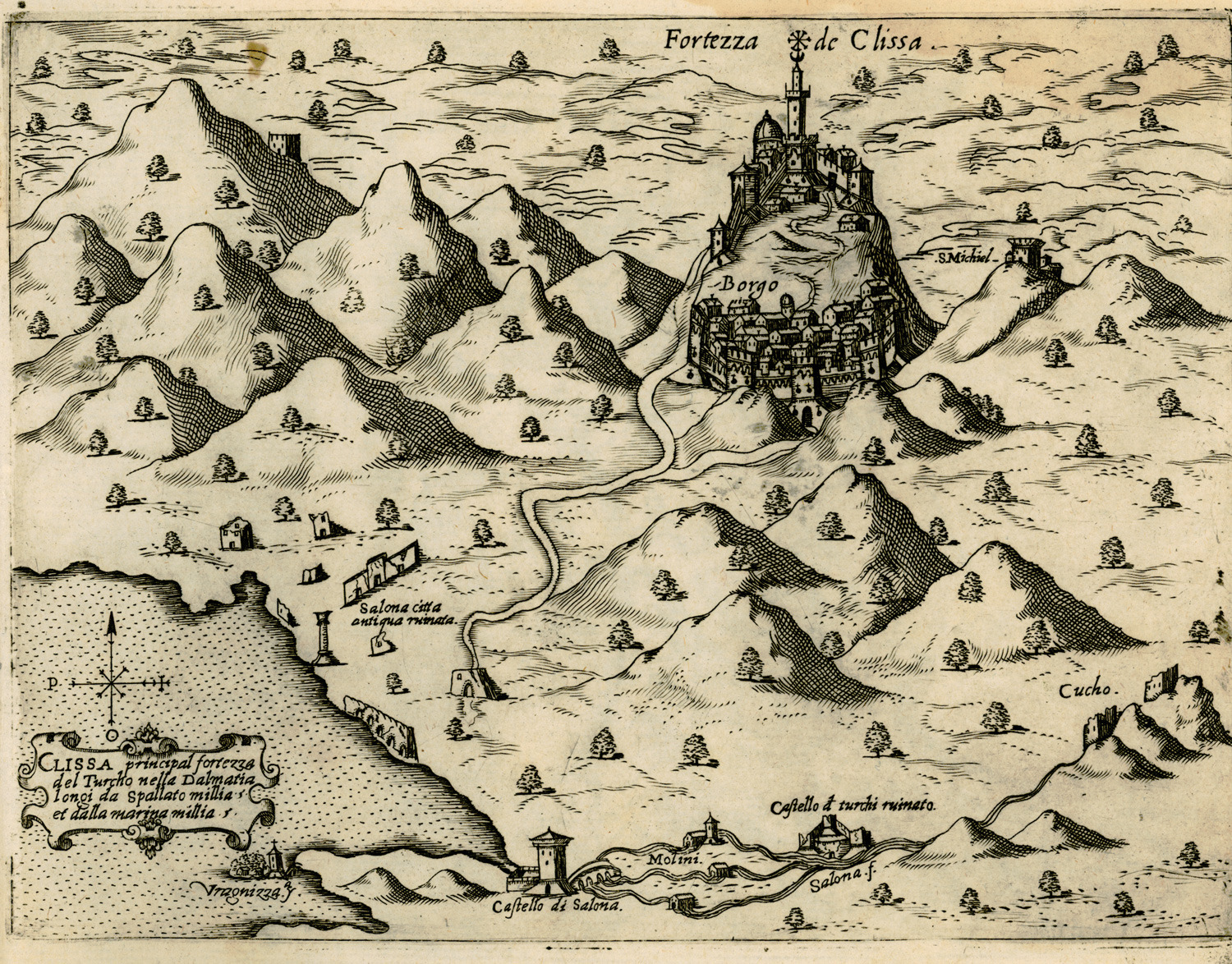
Klis Fortress (16th century)

Petar Kružić (cca. 1490 – 12 March 1537) was a Croatian captain and knez of Klis, captain of Senj, and knez of Lupoglav.

In the early 16th century, Kružić defended the Fortress of Klis against Ottoman invasion. He died in 1537 trying to break yet another siege by the Ottomans. After his death, the Klis defenders moved to Senj, continuing to act as Uskoks. In this way, the Ottomans finally conquered the Klis Fortress after almost two and a half decades of its successful defense.

== Origin ==
His birth date is unknown, usually considered to have been born around 1490. He was of lower nobility origin from Krug in Nebljuh, a district of the same-titled tribe in the župa of Lapac in Lika. However, later chroniclers, and historians, mostly for local patriotic reasons, tried to appropriate and present him as one of their countrymen because he enjoyed incredible popularity as an anti-Ottoman fighter, especially in the areas from which Klis defenders came (Poljica).

== Military career ==
His early activity is unknown. He joined the defending forces of Klis Fortress in 1513. For some time he was in captivity in Bosnia.

By 1520 he was promoted to captain of the Klis Fortress. He participated in a winning battle against Ottoman forces at Plješivica, but his decision not to aid the Croatian ban Petar Berislavić resulted in ban's death. Soon, king Louis II of Hungary proclaimed Kružić as comes of Klis. In 1522 he was named the Captain of Senj together with Grgur Orlovčić who was named co-captain of Klis. They were active at those duties together until the Battle of Mohács (1526) when Orlovčić died in battle.

In July 1523, he went on a military excursion from Klis, but was defeated and injured. In February 1524, Ottoman captain Mustafa laid a siege on Klis Fortress with around 3000 men. The fort managed to hold off the invasion for over two months, while Kružić went to Senj just days before the siege and gathered an army of 1500 foot soldiers, 60 cavalry, and 40 ships to flank the Ottoman army. He arrived at the town of Solin the night of 10 April from where they launched an attack on the Ottoman forces, destroying their army. For this achievement, he was rewarded with the castle Brezovica by the king Louis II. In the next year, he helped Christoph Frankopan bring aid to the Walled city of Jajce.

King Ferdinand I's lack of measures and financial help for the soldiers (aside gifted Lupoglav Castle in Istria in 1527) resulted in protest of Kružić, resigning from the position of the captain of Senj in 1529, and became dedicated to the protection of Klis, using Lupoglav as his headquarters, and Lovran as naval base, proclaiming himself as comes Clissii et Lupoglavi. During his time arrived new Croatian settlers in Lupoglav. In 1530 went to pilgrimage to Basilica della Santa Casa in Loreto.

From then on, Klis was under constant threat from the Turkish armies, but Kružić also regularly raided the hinterland. On 4 June 1532, while Kružić was seeking help from potential ally cities and states, a large Turkish army led by Venetian Nicola Querini took control of Klis with the help of traitors. However, soon afterward, Kružić returned with 2000 men from the city of Ancona and took control of the fort. On 18 September, he managed to take over a Turkish fort in Solin and destroyed it.

By the end of August 1536, the Ottomans had gathered a large army and repaired the fortress in Solin that Kružić had conquered in 1532 (and was subsequently forced to abandon), and had built two new forts to surround Klis. Since that time, Klis was under constant attack by the Ottomans, but the Uskok defenders managed to hold them off. Help arrived in March 1537 when 3000 soldiers sent by Ferdinand I and 700 Italian soldiers sent by Pope Paul III arrived. Petar Kružić led the armies and stormed the Ottoman strongholds, managing to destroy two; while storming the third, Ottoman captain Murat-beg came with 2000 men yelling and shouting, causing the German and Italian soldiers to begin fleeing towards the coast of Solin. Kružić was amongst the last to retreat, unable to sail from the shore, and was surrounded, arrested, and killed by the Ottoman forces. His body and head were bought by his sister Jelena and buried in the Franciscan monastery in Trsat. Lupoglav was inherited by his illegitimate son Ivan, cavalry captain.

After the death of their captain and suffering a lack of water supplies, the defenders of Klis surrendered to the Ottomans in exchange for their freedom. On 12 March 1537, the city and the fortress were released to Ottoman control. Many of the citizens left the town while the Uskoci went to the city of Senj, where they continued their activity. The loss of Klis meant the loss of the whole of Southern Croatia for a long time to the Kingdom of Croatia (Habsburg).

== Family ==
Kružić had two sisters, Jelena and Katarina, and a brother, Franjo. He was married to Jerolima (nee. Vragović), and had two sons, Franjo (deceased) and illegitimate Ivan (nee. Vidašić), while there's no source for Jakov. Toma Kružić, in the service of Croatian ban Ivan Karlović, was possibly Kružić's relative.

== Legacy ==
Kružić is known for constructing the chapel of Saint Nicholas and 118 steps leading from Rijeka to Trsat in 1531, known since 1931 colloquially as the Petar Kružić staircase, along with the chapel of Saint Peter near the church of Gospa Trsatska. He is considered to have formulated the basic principle of the Uskok strategy. In his memory are named schools, streets, and squares in Croatia.

== See also ==
- Hundred Years' Croatian–Ottoman War
