= Brštanovo =

- Village
- Location within Split-Dalmatia County Location within Croatia
- Coordinates: 43.659°N 16.413°E
- Country: Croatia
- Region: Dalmatia
- County: Split-Dalmatia County
- Municipality: Klis

Area
  - Total: 20.7 km^{2} (8.0 sq mi)
- Elevation: 409 m (1,342 ft)

Population (2021)
  - Total: 265
  - Density: 12.8/km^{2} (33.2/sq mi)
- Time zone: UTC+1 (CET)
  - Summer (DST): UTC+2 (CEST)
- Postal code: 21202
- Area code: 021

Brštanovo is a village in the Split-Dalmatia County, Croatia. The settlement is administered as a part of Klis municipality. According to national census of 2011, population of the settlement was 286.

== Famous people ==
- Marija Edita Šolić, Croatian botanist
