= Konjsko, Trebinje =

Konjsko Коњско
- Village
- Location within Bosnia and Herzegovina
- Coordinates: 42°38′34″N 18°27′55″E
- Country: Bosnia and Herzegovina
- Entity: Republika Srpska
- Municipality: Trebinje
- Time zone: UTC+1 (CET)
  - Summer (DST): UTC+2 (CEST)

Konjsko (Serbian Cyrillic: Коњско) is a village in the municipality of Trebinje, Republika Srpska, Bosnia and Herzegovina.
