= Vučevica, Croatia =

Vučevica
- Village
- Interactive map of Vučevica
- Location within Split-Dalmatia County Location within Croatia
- Coordinates: 43°35′49″N 16°24′40″E
- Country: Croatia
- Region: Dalmatia
- County: Split-Dalmatia County
- Municipality: Klis

Area
  - Total: 17.5 km^{2} (6.8 sq mi)
- Elevation: 372 m (1,220 ft)

Population (2021)
  - Total: 44
  - Density: 2.5/km^{2} (6.5/sq mi)
- Time zone: UTC+1 (CET)
  - Summer (DST): UTC+2 (CEST)
- Postal code: 21202
- Area code: 021

Vučevica is a village in the Split-Dalmatia County, Croatia. The settlement is administered as a part of Klis municipality. According to national census of 2011, population of the settlement is 56.

South of the village there is an interchange of the A1 motorway. Further south is the Kozjak mountain. As of 2026 the Kozjak Tunnel is in construction, to connect the road to Kaštela near the Luko Ridge.
