= Prugovo, Croatia =

Coordinates: 43°37′14″N 16°29′30″E

- Interactive map of Prugovo, Croatia

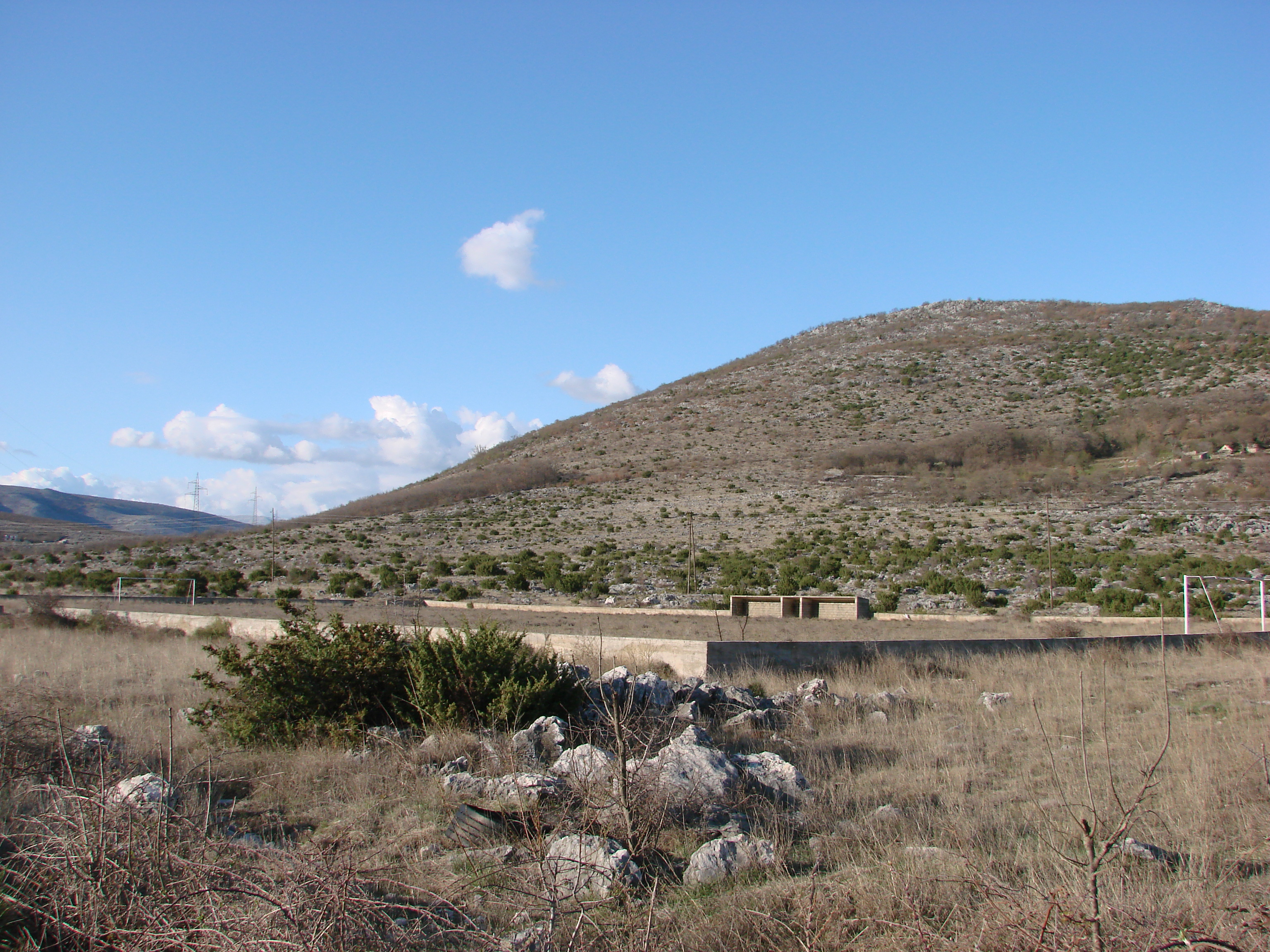

Prugovo is a village near Klis, Croatia. In the 2011 census, it had 555 inhabitants.
