= Jure Radić (priest) =

- Born: November 28, 1920; Baška Voda, Croatia
- Died: July 25, 1990; Split, Croatia
- Occupation(s): Catholic priest, scientist
- Known for: Founder of Malacological Museum in Makarska; Institute "Mountains and Sea"; journal Služba Božja

Jure Radić (28 November 1920 – 25 July 1990) was a Croatian Catholic priest and scientist.

He was born in Baška Voda. He taught as a professor of liturgy at the Faculty of Theology in Makarska. He explored the flora of Biokovo and Makarska littoral, and benthic fauna of Makarska underwater. In 1963 he founded the Malacological museum in Makarska, and in 1979 the Institute "Mountains and Sea", in which he collaborated with Edita Marija Šolić. He also founded conference proceedings series Acta Biocovica (1981). He co-founded and edited the first Croatian journal in liturgical-pastoral theology Služba Božja in 1960.

He died in Split.
