= Konjsko, Klis =

Village near Klis, Croatia

- Interactive map of Konjsko, Klis

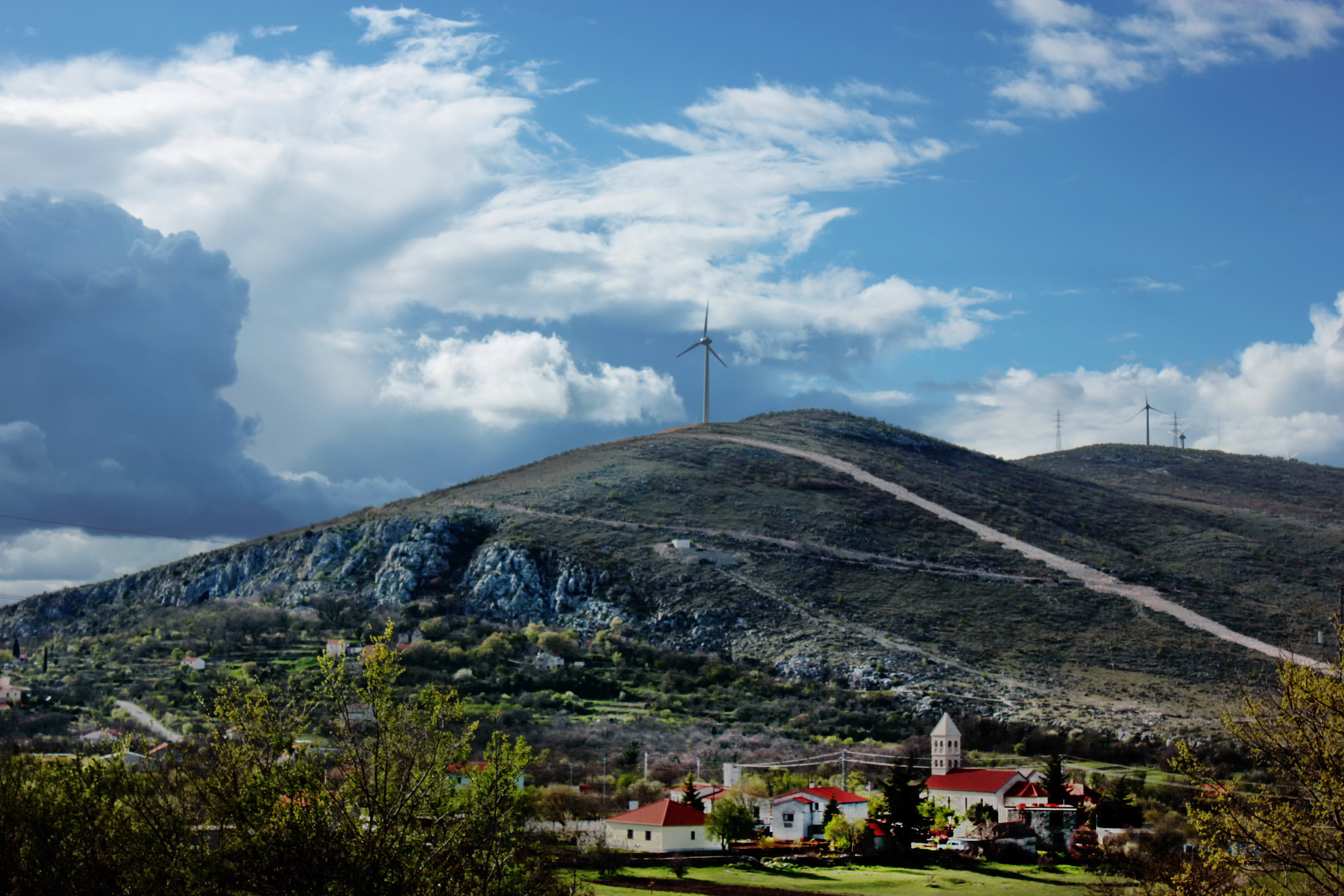
Konjsko

Konjsko is a village near Klis, Croatia. In the 2011 census, it had 283 inhabitants.
