= Klis =

- Municipality
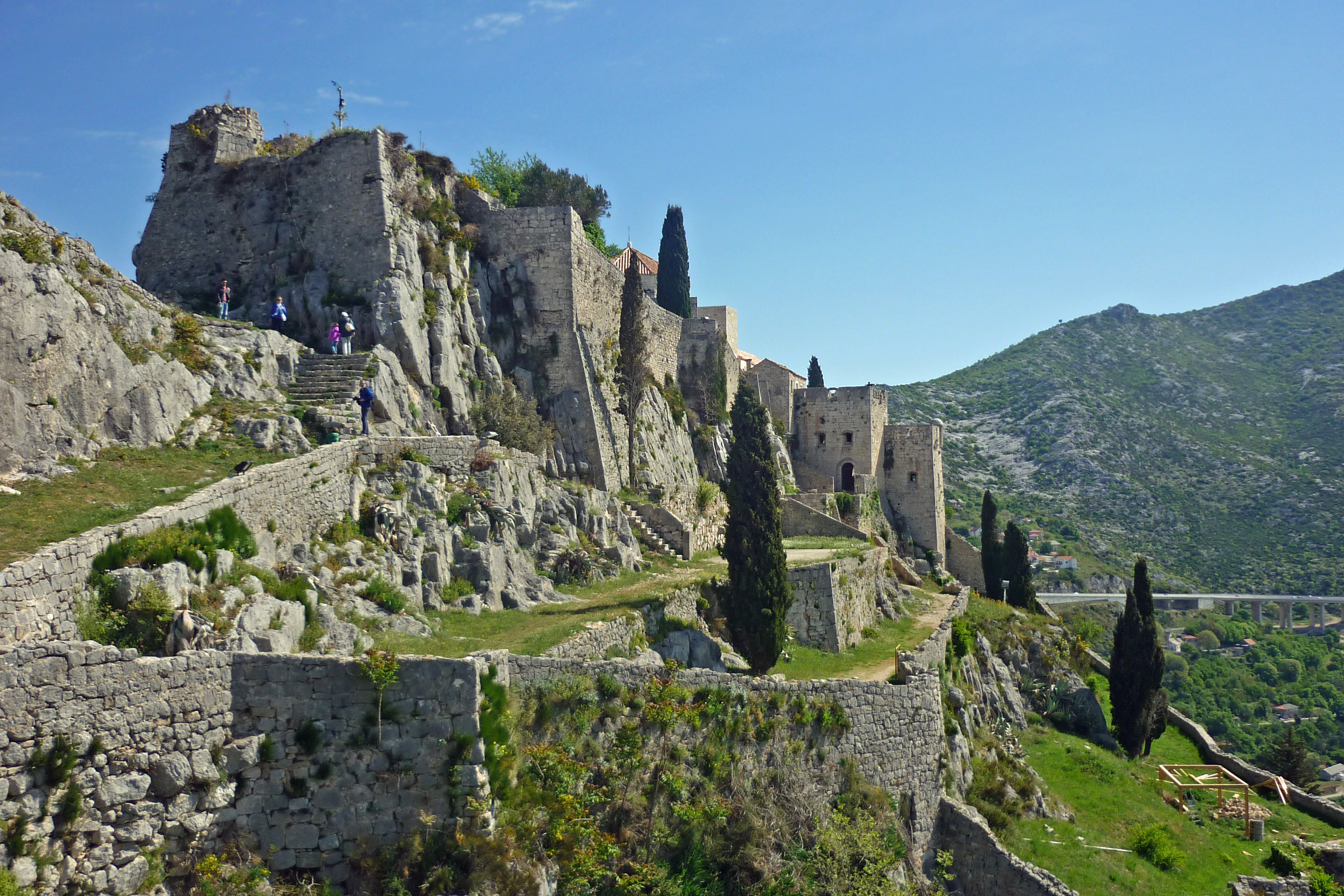

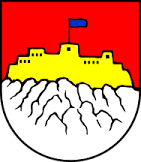
- Flag

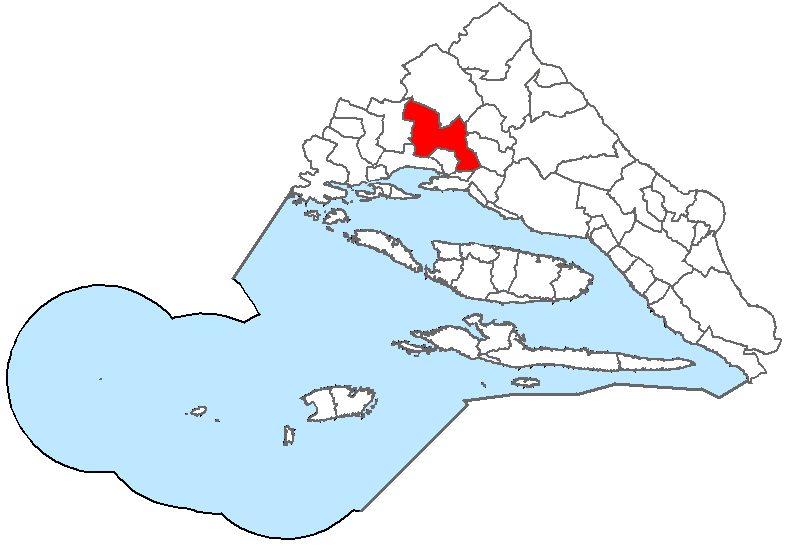
- Interactive map of Klis
- Location within Croatia
- Coordinates: 43°34′N 16°31′E
- Country: Croatia
- Region: Dalmatian Hinterland
- County: Split-Dalmatia County

Area
  - Municipality: 149.1 km^{2} (57.6 sq mi)
  - Urban: 24.1 km^{2} (9.3 sq mi)

Population (2021)
  - Municipality: 5,226
  - Density: 35.05/km^{2} (90.78/sq mi)
  - Urban: 3,496
  - Urban density: 145/km^{2} (376/sq mi)
- Time zone: UTC+1 (CET)
  - Summer (DST): UTC+2 (CEST)
- Postal code: 21 231
- Website: klis.hr

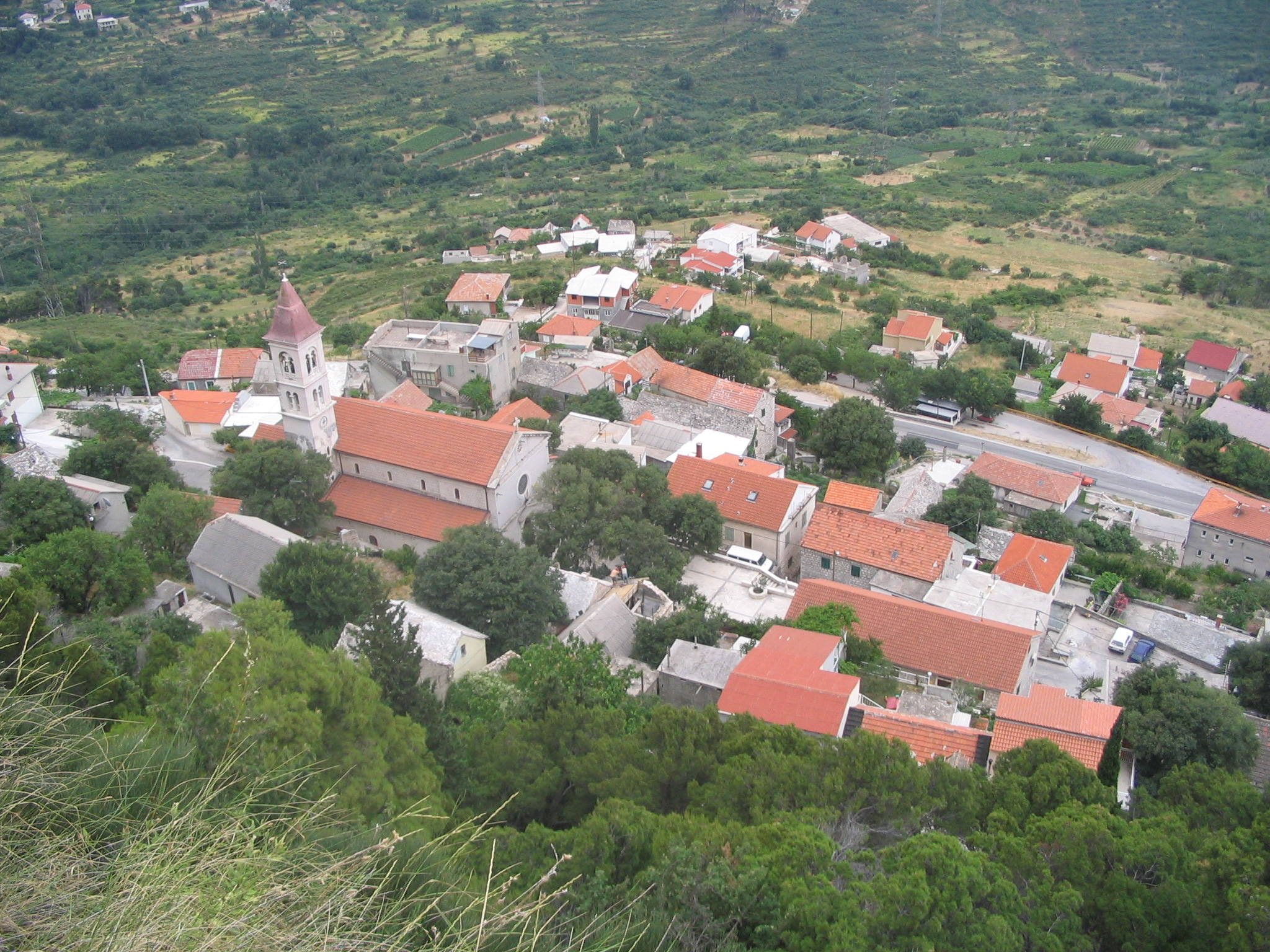
Klis seen from the Klis Fortress

Klis is a Croatian village and a municipality located around a mountain fortress bearing the same name.

== Population ==
In the 2011 census, the municipality of Klis had a total population of 4,801, consisting of the following settlements:

- Brštanovo, population 286
- Dugobabe, population 137
- Klis, population 3,001
- Konjsko, population 283
- Korušce, population 80
- Nisko, population 244
- Prugovo, population 555
- Veliki Bročanac, population 159
- Vučevica, population 56
Klis: Population trends 1857–2021
v

population	3890	4266	4392	4939	5668	6228	7334	7299	6324	6360	6010	5113	4063	4241	4367	4801	5226
	1857	1869	1880	1890	1900	1910	1921	1931	1948	1953	1961	1971	1981	1991	2001	2011	2021

Sources: Croatian Bureau of Statistics publications

== Geography ==
Klis is a suburb of the city of Split located in the region of Dalmatia, just northeast of Solin and Split proper near the eponymous mountain pass.

The Klis mountain pass separates the mountains Mosor and Kozjak at an altitude of 360m. It has had major strategic value throughout history because any inland force passing through Klis would have been able to easily reach the entire region of Split and Kaštela.

Due to its geographical position, Klis is also susceptible to a rather strong bura wind.

== History ==
During the Ottoman wars in Europe, an already existing Roman fortress on a nearby hill was expanded into Klis Fortress. It was the centre of a sanjak within the Province of Bosnia during Ottoman rule. Klis was also ruled by the Kingdom of Bosnia, the Venetian Republic, and Austria-Hungary.

In Klis area was first mentioned name of "Uskoks"

== Notable objects ==
- One of only three preserved Ottoman mosques on the territory of Croatia exists in the Klis fortress. The mosque was built shortly after the Ottoman conquest of Klis in year 1537. It was converted into a Catholic church after the Venetian conquest of Klis in year 1648, and it has been used for that purpose ever since.
- An old Turkish public water faucet exists in the town.
- Fortress of Klis

== Transportation ==
The village is served by local bus from Split city centre.

== See also ==
- Petar Kružić
- NK Uskok
