= Rječina =

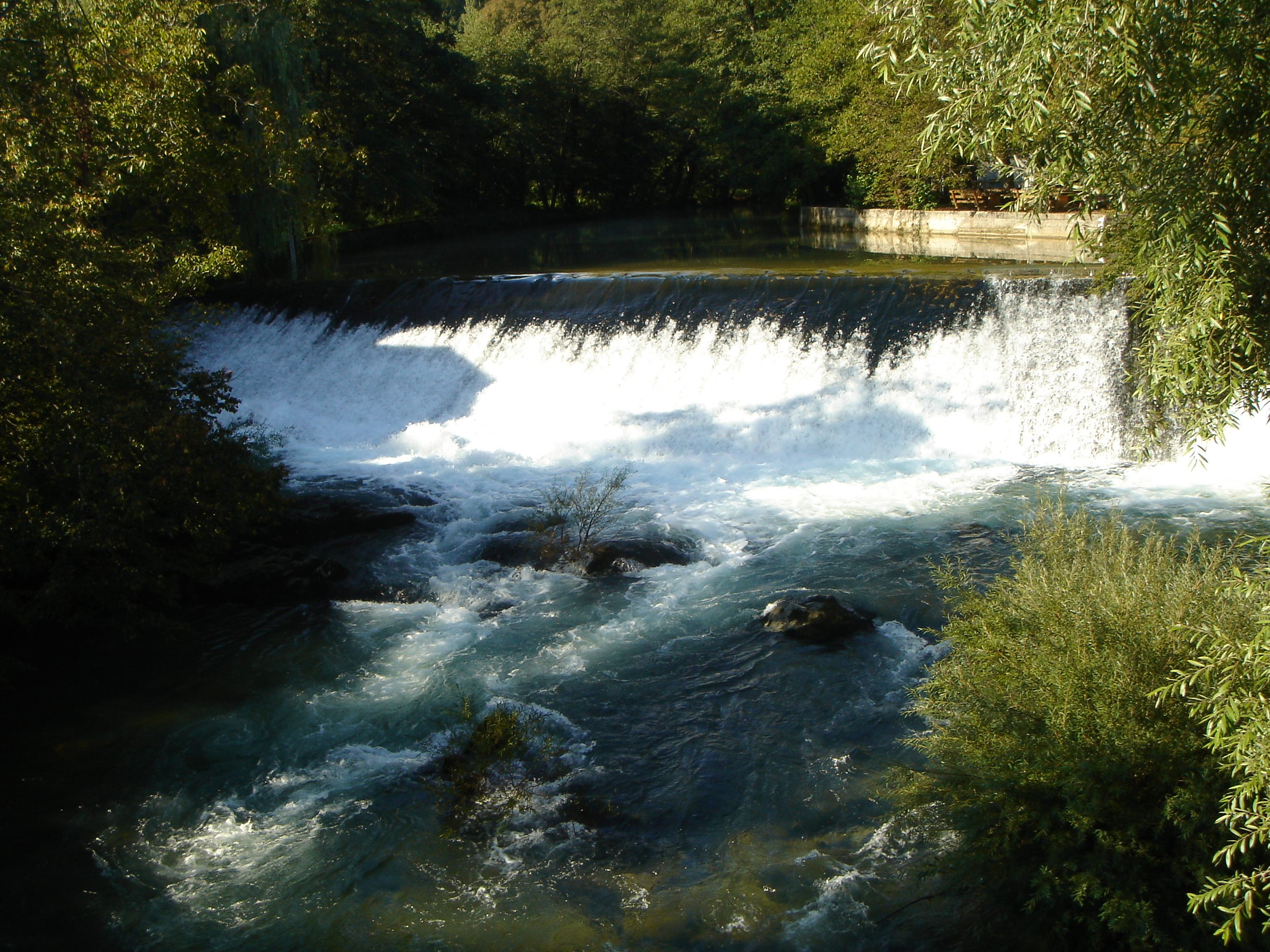
- Waterfall in Martinovo Selo

Location
- Country: Croatia

Physical characteristics
- Mouth
  - location: Adriatic Sea
  - coordinates: 45.3220°N 14.4495°E
- Length: 18 km (11 mi)

The Rječina (Italian: Eneo; German: Flaum or Pflaum), also known as the Fiumara, is a river in Croatia that flows into the Adriatic Sea at the city of Rijeka (Italian: Fiume).

It is about 18 kilometers (11 mi) long, with an average width of 9 to 16 meters (30 to 52 ft). It springs from a cave at an elevation of 325 meters (1,066 ft) above sea level, below the high cliff of Kičej Hill (elevation 606 meters or 1,988 feet). Until 1870 the river's spring was below the next hill, Podjavorje, but it collapsed in an earthquake near the village of Klana. The most significant confluents are the Sušica, Lužac, Zala, Zahumčica, Golubinka, Ričinica, and Borovšćica, but they are dry for most of the year. In 1968 a dam Valići was built, creating Lake Valići to facilitate a hydroelectric power plant, HE Rijeka, but destroying the village of the same name in the process. The Rječina flows through a canyon for almost half of its length. In Rijeka, the river branches into two parts: Dead Channel (Mrtvi kanal, the old basin), and the new channel, which was created in the 19th century, when Dead Channel was used as a harbor. The best-known sight is the Gaspar Mill (Gašparov mlin) in Martinovo Selo, which was restored in the 1990s. Notable fauna are trout and river crabs.

== Border ==
This river has often been the border between different states. The first time this happened was from the 13th to 16th centuries, when it formed the border between the Lands of the Crown of Saint Stephen and the Habsburgs. A similar thing happened in 1868, when the Rječina became the border between the Croatian and Hungarian parts of Austria-Hungary. After World War I it became for a very short time the border between the Free State of Fiume and the Kingdom of the Serbs, Croats and Slovenes. After the Free State of Fiume was annexed by Italy, the Rječina became the border river of that country. Since World War II, the Rječina has no longer been a border between states.

== Fauna ==
Among invertebrates, following were documented in the river so far: Elmis bosnica, Gammarus fossarum, Austropotamobius pallipes, Ecdyonurus venosus, Perla pallida, Perla marginata, Rhyacophila dorsalis persimilis, Aquarius najas, Notonecta glauca, Aeshna cyanea, Crocothemis erythraea and Ancylus fluviatilis.
