= Stolac (disambiguation) =

Stolac is a town and municipality in Bosnia and Herzegovina, located in Herzegovina.

Stolac may also refer to:

- Stolac (Bugojno), a village in Bosnia and Herzegovina
- Stolac (Gacko), a village in Bosnia and Herzegovina
- Stolac (Višegrad), a village in Bosnia and Herzegovina
- Stolac, Croatia, a village near Senj
