= Klada =

Klada may refer to:

- Klada, Croatia, a village near Senj
- Klada, Škofljica, a village above Želimlje, Slovenia
- Mustafina Klada, a village near Velika Ludina, Croatia

== See also ==
- Crna Klada, an uninhabited settlement in Croatia
- Kladas (disambiguation)
