= Sveta Jelena =

Sveta Jelena (lit. 'Saint Helen') may refer to:

- Sveta Jelena, Međimurje, a historic site near Šenkovec, Croatia
- Sveta Jelena, Istria, a village near Mošćenička Draga, Croatia
- Sveta Jelena, Vinodol, a village near Crikvenica, Croatia now known as Dramalj
- Sveta Jelena, Lika-Senj County, a village near Senj, Croatia
