= Bunica =

Bunica may refer to:

- Bunica (river), a tributary to the Buna in Bosnia and Herzegovina
- Bunica, Croatia, a village near Senj
