= Crni Kal =

Crni Kal may refer to:

- Črni Kal, a village near Koper, Slovenia
- Crni Kal, Croatia, a village near Senj
