= Vratnik =

Vratnik may refer to:

- Vratnik (Sarajevo), a neighbourhood of Stari Grad, Sarajevo, Bosnia and Herzegovina
- Vratnik Pass (Bulgaria), a mountain pass over the Balkan Mountain
- Vratnik pass (Croatia), a mountain pass over the Velebit
- Vratnik Samoborski, a village near Samobor, Croatia
- Vratnik, Lika-Senj County, a village near Senj, Croatia
