= Pijavica =

Settlement in Lika-Senj County, Croatia

- Settlement
- Interactive map of Pijavica
- Location of Pijavica in Croatia
- Coordinates: 45°00′44″N 14°53′28″E
- Country: Croatia
- County: Lika-Senj
- City: Senj

Area
  - Total: 1.2 km^{2} (0.46 sq mi)

Population (2021)
  - Total: 23
  - Density: 19/km^{2} (50/sq mi)
- Time zone: UTC+1 (CET)
  - Summer (DST): UTC+2 (CEST)
- Postal code: 53270 Senj
- Area code: +385 (0)53

Pijavica is a settlement in the City of Senj in Croatia. In 2021, its population was 23.

== Demographics ==
Pijavica: Population trends 2011–2021
v

population	262	23
	2011	2021

Sources: Croatian Bureau of Statistics publications
