= Vrataruša =

Settlement in Lika-Senj County, Croatia

- Settlement
- Interactive map of Vrataruša
- Location of Vrataruša in Croatia
- Coordinates: 45°02′09″N 14°54′54″E
- Country: Croatia
- County: Lika-Senj
- City: Senj

Area
  - Total: 23.7 km^{2} (9.2 sq mi)

Population (2021)
  - Total: 5
  - Density: 0.21/km^{2} (0.55/sq mi)
- Time zone: UTC+1 (CET)
  - Summer (DST): UTC+2 (CEST)
- Postal code: 53270 Senj
- Area code: +385 (0)53

Vrataruša is a settlement in the City of Senj in Croatia. In 2021, its population was 5.

== Demographics ==
Vrataruša: Population trends 1857–2021
v

population	338			546	480	509	411	323	463	377	271	173	135	180	262	11	5
	1857	1869	1880	1890	1900	1910	1921	1931	1948	1953	1961	1971	1981	1991	2001	2011	2021

Sources: Croatian Bureau of Statistics publications
