= Ivan Paskvić =

Ivan Paskvić (German: Johann Pasquich, Hungarian: János Pasquich; 3 January 1754 – 15 December 1829) was a Croatian astronomer, physicist and mathematician.

== Biography ==
Paskvić was born in Senj. He was educated in Zagreb, from 1778 in Graz and from 1782 in Buda. In Buda he was an adjunct professor of physics, professor of mathematics, Dean of the Faculty of Arts, and director of Buda Observatory. His Slovak colleague Daniel M. Kmeth accused him in several scientific journals of forging observational data of Buda Observatory. After examining the data many prominent scientists in Europe stood in Paskvić's defense, such as Carl Friedrich Gauss, Friedrich Bessel, Johann Franz Encke, Heinrich Wilhelm Matthias Olbers, Heinrich Christian Schumacher. From 1824 he worked in Vienna where he died.

== Research and work ==
Paskvić dealt with astronomy, higher geodesy, mathematics, mechanics and theory of machines. His scientific work is divided into two periods. The first period deals with mechanics, higher mathematics and with its applications to theory of machines. The second period deals with astronomy and higher geodesy. He derives the formula for the length of a mathematical seconds pendulum at any place on the Earth, compares it with that of Laplace and corrects de Prony's formula for the length of physical seconds pendulum. He determined the flattening of the Earth by finding formula's for 1) radius of the circle that passes through a point on Earth's surface and is parallel to the equator, 2) distance of the center of this circle from the center of the Earth, 3) meridian radius curvature at any point on Earth's surface, 4) size of one meridian degree, 5) the angle between the radius of the Earth at the equator and at some other point on Earth's surface, 6) the length of the quarter meridian, 7) the length of the meridian arc, 8) surface of Earth's zone between any two parallels.

== See also ==
- 11191 Paskvić

== Sources ==
- Stipe Kutleša (1988). "O Senjaninu Ivanu Paskviću i njegovim radovima iz mehanike". Senjski zbornik. 15 (1): 149–155.
- Patkós, Laszló (1988). "The Pasquich affair". Acta Historica Astronomiae. 24 (1): 182–187. Bibcode:2004AcHA...24..182P.
