= Ivo Senjanin =

Croatian outlaw

- Born: Ivan Vlatković; Senj (now Croatia)
- Died: 1612
- Other name: Ivo Senjanin
- Military career
- Allegiance: Habsburg Empire
- Unit: Uskoks in Senj
- Conflicts: Ottoman–Venetian War (1570–1573); Long Turkish War (1593–1606)

Ivan Vlatković (fl. 1571 – 1612), known in folklore as Ivo Senjanin ("Ivo of Senj"), was a Habsburg Croatian uskok who led numerous military exploits against the Ottoman Empire. Due to few historical sources, much of what is known about him today is mainly attributed to legend and folklore detailing his life and accomplishments with a medieval romanticism.

== Life ==
=== Background ===
Ivan Vlatković was born sometime in the 16th century. According to Yugoslav historian Vaso Čubrilović, he was the son of Novak, and belonged to a notable family of Senj, from where his family originated. According to Serbian writer Stojan Berber, his ancestors were originally from Herzegovina, while according to Bosnian Croat writer Ivo Sivrić, Senjanin was born in Senj or somewhere nearby into a family of immigrants from Herzegovina, the son of a Vlatko Jurjević. According to Sivrić he had three siblings, brothers George and Nicholas, and sister Matija.

=== Military exploits ===
During the Long Turkish War (1593–1606), he led the uskoks during the liberation of Petrinja (1594) and Klis (1596). He was subsequently named as the commander of an uskok regiment in border forts of Otočac and Brinje. Following an uskok revolt, he returned to Senj and became the main uskok leader, and from this point he began to make a name for himself by defeating Ahmet-aga Cukarinović in a duel, and by launching a series of expeditions to the territories under Ottoman rule primarily in the Dalmatian hinterland, namely Šibenik area (1598), Solin (1604), Skradin (1605), Trebinje and Herceg Novi. Archduke Ferdidand promised him a regular monetary compensation and also to pay all the debts to him under the condition that he stops plundering and attacking subjects of states that are not at war with the Habsburg monarchy. Given that this promise was not fulfilled, Ivo's subordinates (such as Juriša Senjanin) became disobedient, attacking and robbing Venetian and Ottoman subjects.

In spite of his attempts to maintain peace on the border towards the Ottoman Empire, he was arrested in 1611 under the accusations of stealing the supplies of the Senj garrison. Despite being defended by the Senj nobility, citizens, bishopric and vice-captains, he was sentenced to death on 3 July 1612. He subsequently filed a request for pardon, in which he described himself as a "miserable captured Croatian warrior" (armer gefangener Crawatischer Kriegsdienstmann) and laid out his military accomplishments. He was eventually executed in Karlovac sometime before 25 July 1612.

== Legend ==
Senjanin is hero of several epic poems found in Erlangen Manuscript dated between 1716 and 1733. Today there are many folk-songs and gusle poems (ballads) written in honour of Ivo due to his heroic legacy as a hajduk and uskok. The name Ivo Senjanin was adopted from epic poetry. Another name used for him was Senković.

== Death Ballad ==
Another ballad recalls how on one occasion he was said to have vanquished fifty thousand Turks with only eight hundred men. His mother envisioned his death in a dream which she relayed to the local priest: while at church, Ivo rode up on his bloodied horse to the door, his severed right hand in his left, and severely wounded in seventeen places. She assisted him off the horse and tended to his injuries, where Ivo recounted how he and his men had been journeying home from Italy with a hoard of treasure when they were assailed by the Turks multiple times. Although they escaped unharmed the first two times, the third proved fatal for all his men. While finishing his tale he was blessed by the priest and soon died in his mother's arms.

The Death of Ivo (A Croat Ballad)

A Dream Has Dreamt the Mother of Ivo.
Darkness she saw fall upon Senj,
The clear heavens burst asunder,
The shimmering moon fell down to earth,
On the church of St. Rose in the midst of Senj.

And the stars were swept across the sky,
And the dawn rose up all red with blood,
And the cuckoo bird she heard a-calling,
In the midst of Senj, on Senj's white church.

When from her dream the dame awakened,
Her staff she took in her right hand,
And went forthwith to St. Rose's church;
And there she told the Archpriest Nedeljko,
Told him all that she had dreamed.

And when the old man had heard her out,
'Twas thus he did expound the dream:

Hear me, O hear me, aged mother!
'Twas an evil dream, and worse shall befall.
That darkness fell on the town of Senj,
Is that desolate it shall remain.
That the clear heavens burst asunder
And the shimmering moon fell down to earth,
It is that Ivo is to die.

That the stars were swept across the sky,
It is that many a widow shall be.
That the dawn rose up all red with blood,
It is that thou shalt be left to weep:
That the cuckoo bird by St. Rose sang,
It is that the Turks shall plunder it,
And me in my old age they shall slay.

(Prof. Seton-Watson)

== Sources ==
- Sivric, Ivo (1982). The peasant culture of Bosnia and Herzegovina. Franciscan Herald Press. ISBN 978-0-8199-0850-6.
- Medenica, Radosav (1987). Erlangenski rukopis: zbornik starih srpskohrvatskih narodnih pesama. Univerzitetska riječ.
- Čubrilović, Vasa (1983). Odabrani istorijski radovi. Narodna knjiga.
- Бербер, Стојан (1997). Српске јуначке песме Крајине: Антологија. Глас српски. ISBN 9788671191142.
