= Volarice =

Settlement in Lika-Senj County, Croatia

- Settlement
- Interactive map of Volarice
- Location of Volarice in Croatia
- Coordinates: 44°53′34″N 14°57′28″E
- Country: Croatia
- County: Lika-Senj
- City: Senj

Area
  - Total: 42.6 km^{2} (16.4 sq mi)

Population (2021)
  - Total: 66
  - Density: 1.5/km^{2} (4.0/sq mi)
- Time zone: UTC+1 (CET)
  - Summer (DST): UTC+2 (CEST)
- Postal code: 53270 Senj
- Area code: +385 (0)53

Volarice is a settlement in the City of Senj in Croatia. In 2021, its population was 66.

== Demographics ==
Volarice: Population trends 1857–2021
v

population	824	877	798	965	1022	1072	879	768	767	785	701	360	224	194	112	86	66
	1857	1869	1880	1890	1900	1910	1921	1931	1948	1953	1961	1971	1981	1991	2001	2011	2021

Sources: Croatian Bureau of Statistics publications
