= Biljevine =

Settlement in Lika-Senj County, Croatia

- Settlement
- Interactive map of Biljevine
- Location of Biljevine in Croatia
- Coordinates: 44°54′24″N 14°56′52″E
- Country: Croatia
- County: Lika-Senj
- City: Senj

Area
  - Total: 44.0 km^{2} (17.0 sq mi)

Population (2021)
  - Total: 42
  - Density: 0.95/km^{2} (2.5/sq mi)
- Time zone: UTC+1 (CET)
  - Summer (DST): UTC+2 (CEST)
- Postal code: 53270 Senj
- Area code: +385 (0)53

Biljevine is a settlement in the City of Senj in Croatia. In 2021, its population was 42.

== Demographics ==
Biljevine: Population trends 1857–2021
v

population	340	299	372	352	438	464	371	403	396	389	343	228	142	75	55	51	42
	1857	1869	1880	1890	1900	1910	1921	1931	1948	1953	1961	1971	1981	1991	2001	2011	2021

Sources: Croatian Bureau of Statistics publications
