= Senj =

- Town
- Grad Senj; Town of Senj
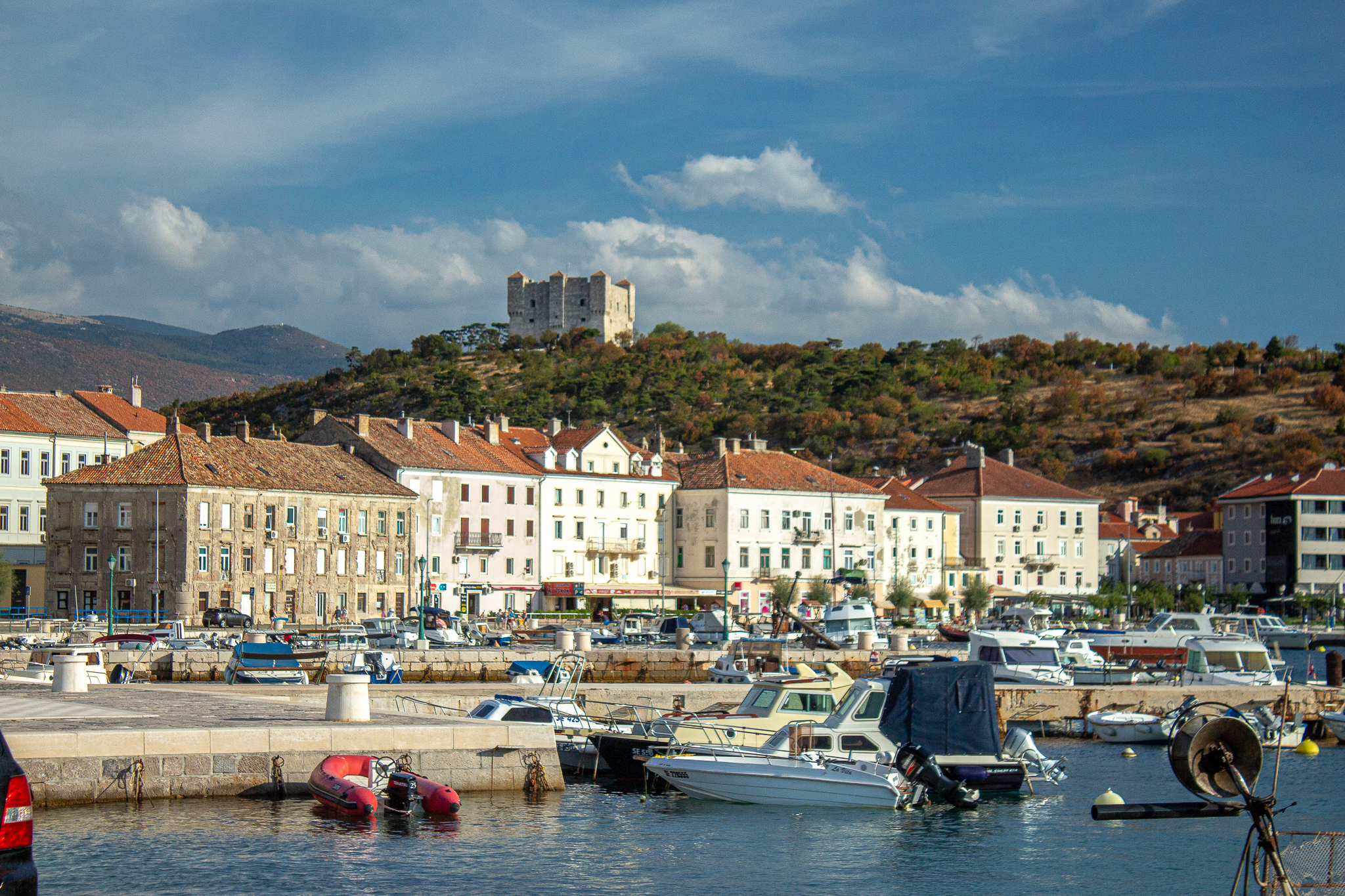
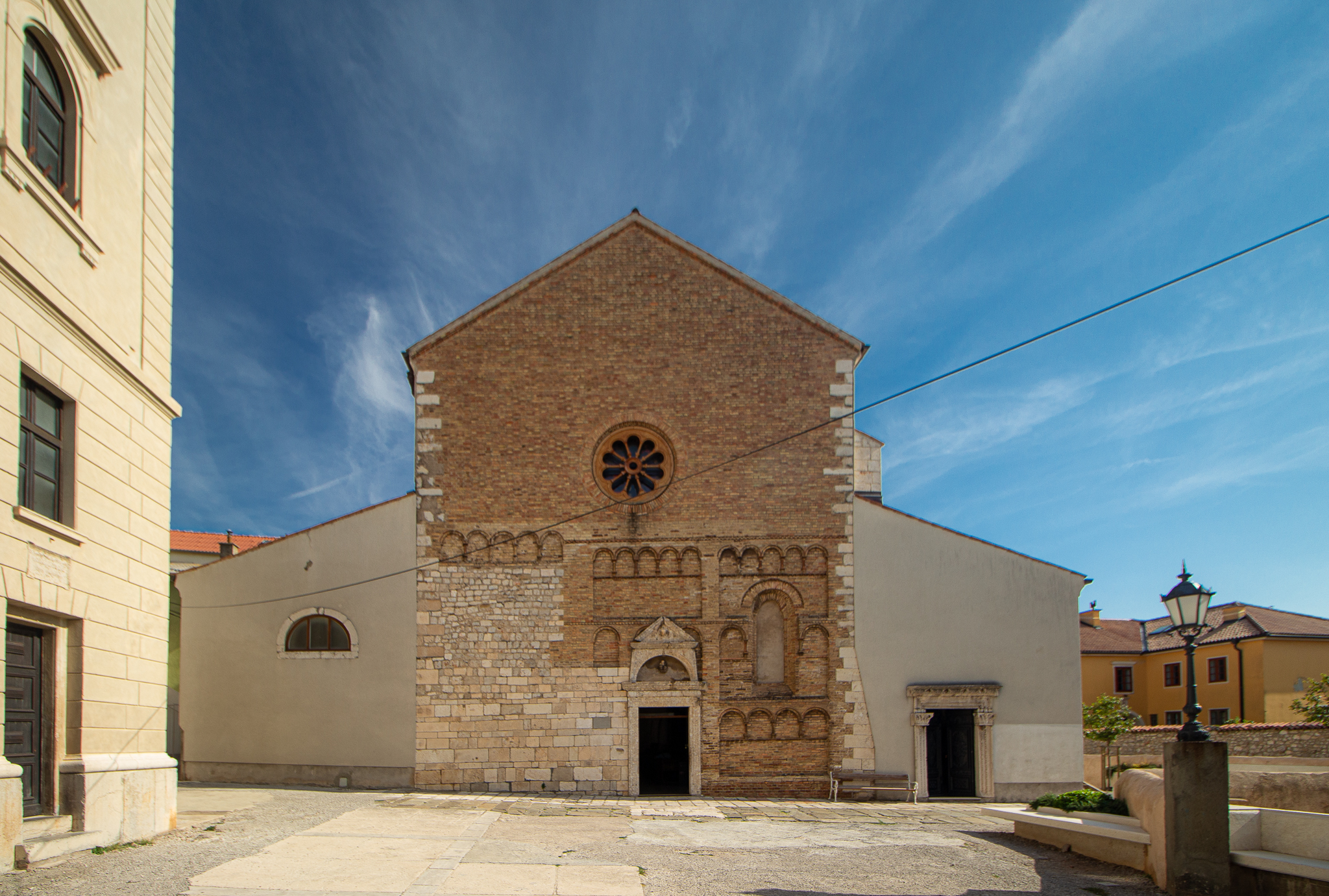
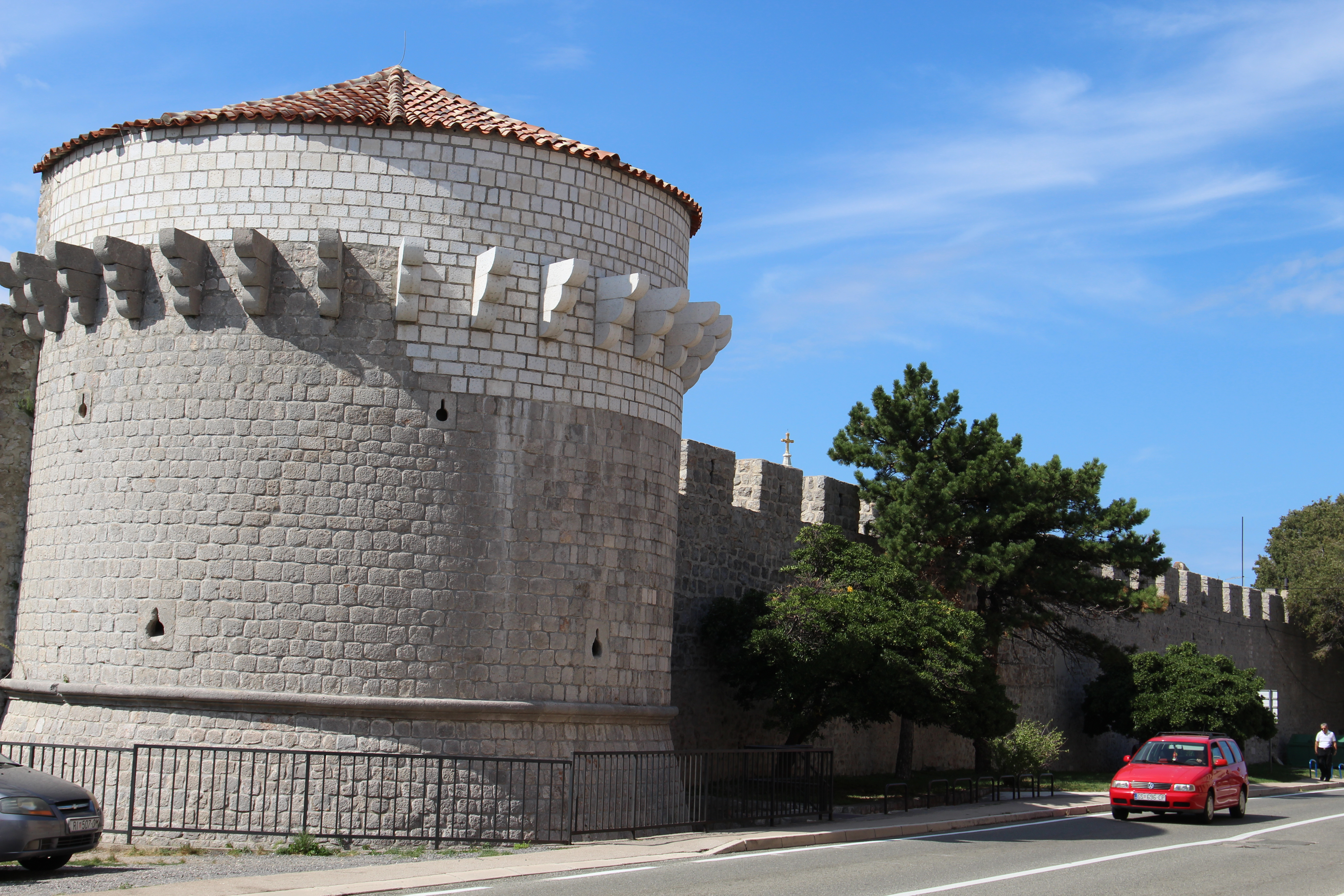
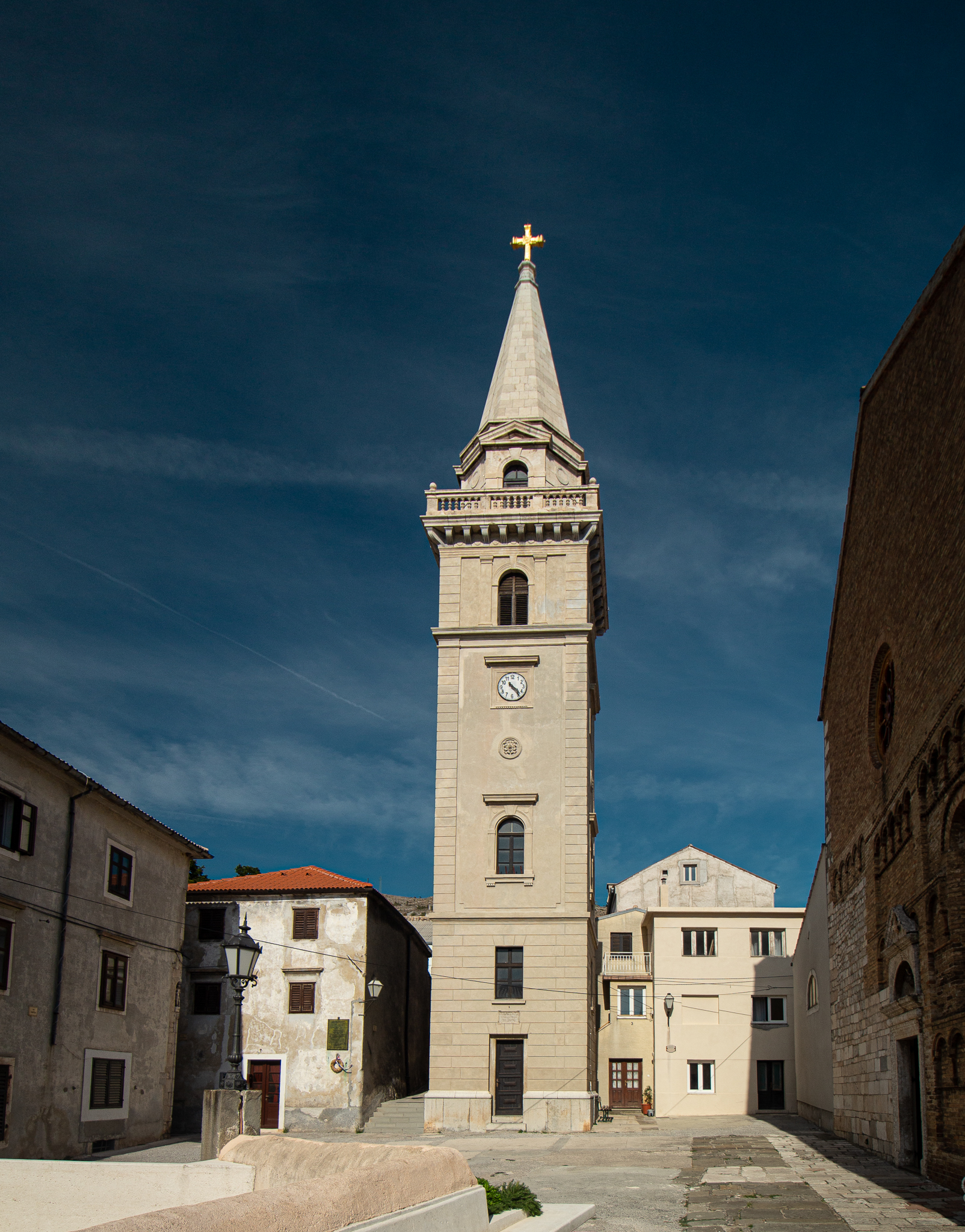
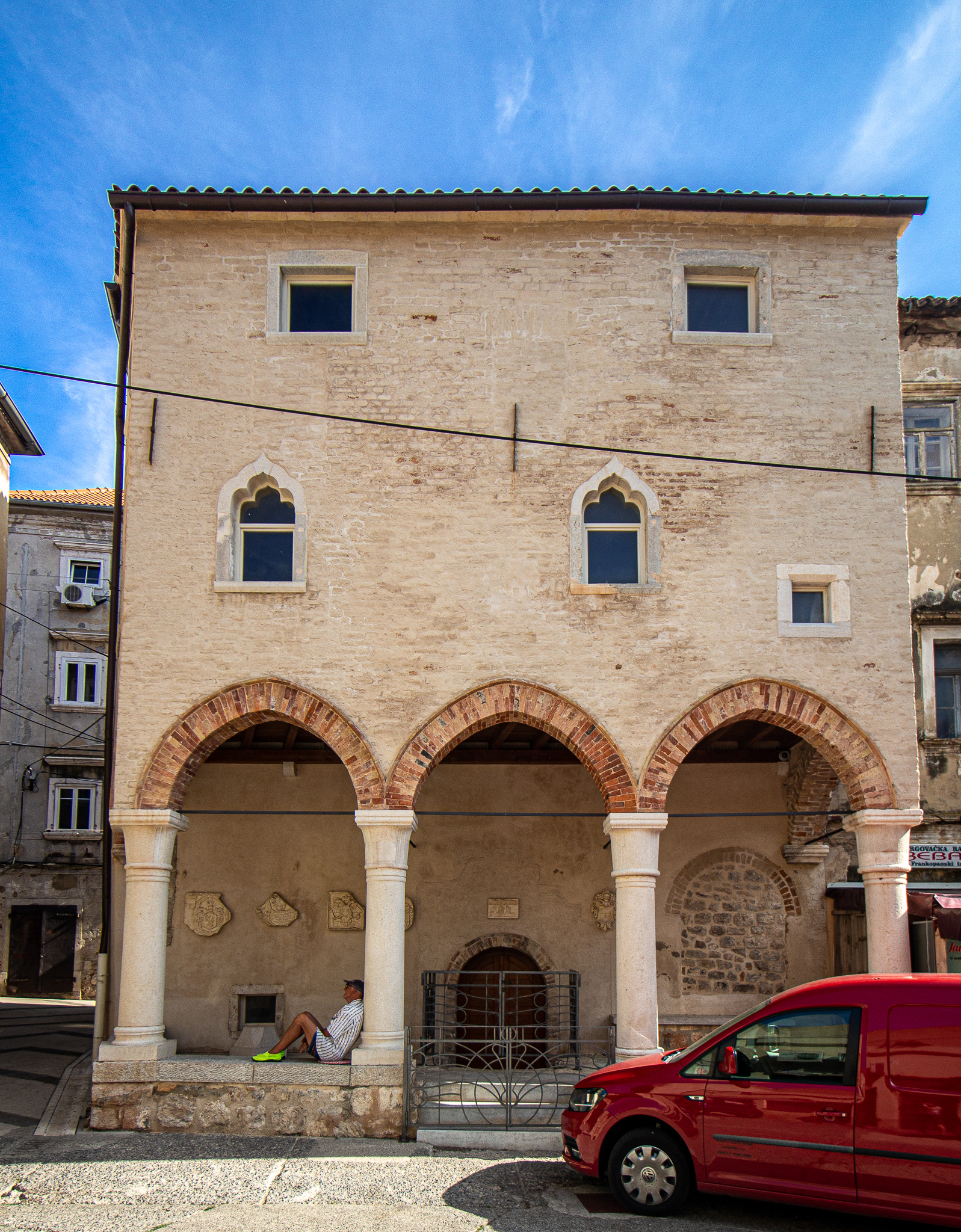
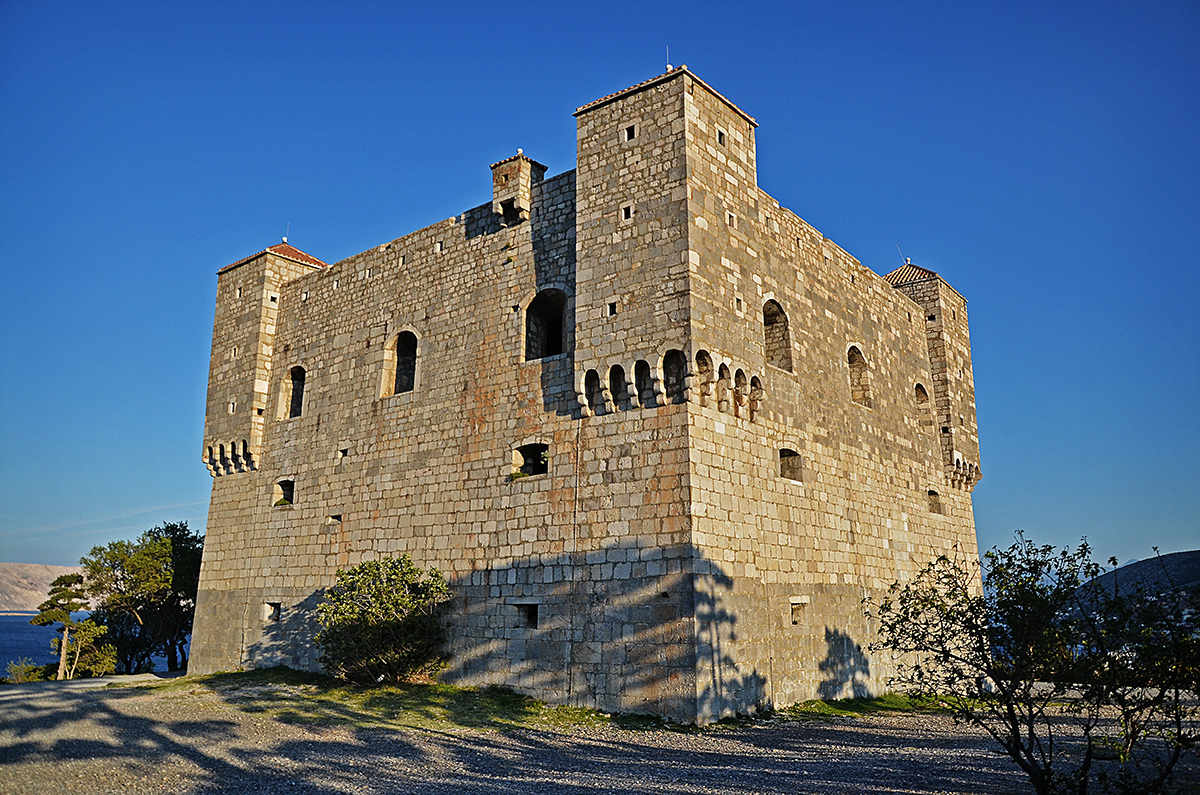
- Clockwise, from top: Senj harbour, City walls, medieval city hall, Nehaj, Co-Cathedral of the Assumption of Mary, Senj, Bell tower of the Co-Cathedral

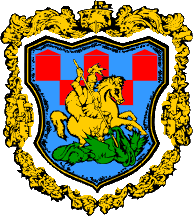
- Seal
- Interactive map of Senj
- Location of Senj within Croatia
- Coordinates: 44°59′24.52″N 14°54′10.96″E
- Country: Croatia
- Region: Central Croatia (Croatian Littoral)
- County: Lika-Senj County

Government
  - Mayor: Željko Tomljanović (HDZ)
  - Town Council: 13 members: • HDZ, HBS (8); • Lipo Party (3); • SDP (1); • Independent (1)

Area
  - Town: 657.9 km^{2} (254.0 sq mi)
  - Urban: 3.2 km^{2} (1.2 sq mi)
- Elevation: 0 m (0 ft)

Population (2021)
  - Town: 5,973
  - Density: 9.079/km^{2} (23.51/sq mi)
  - Urban: 4,164
  - Urban density: 1,300/km^{2} (3,400/sq mi)
- Time zone: UTC+1 (CET)
  - Summer (DST): UTC+2 (CEST)
- Postal code: 53 270
- Area code: 053
- Website: senj.hr

Senj (Note: Croatian: [sêɲ]; Italian: Segna; Latin: Senia; Hungarian and German: Zengg) is a town on the upper Adriatic coast in Croatia, in the foothills of the Mala Kapela and Velebit mountains.

The symbol of the town is the Nehaj Fortress (Croatian: Tvrđava Nehaj) which was completed in 1558. For a time this was the seat of the Uskoks, who were Christian refugees from Ottoman Bosnia resettled here to protect the Habsburg borderlands. The Republic of Venice accused the Uskoks of piracy and declared war on them, which led to their expulsion following a truce in 1617.

Senj is to be found in the Lika-Senj County of Croatia, the Roman Catholic Diocese of Gospić-Senj and the Roman Catholic Archdiocese of Rijeka.

== History ==
=== Prehistory and antiquity ===
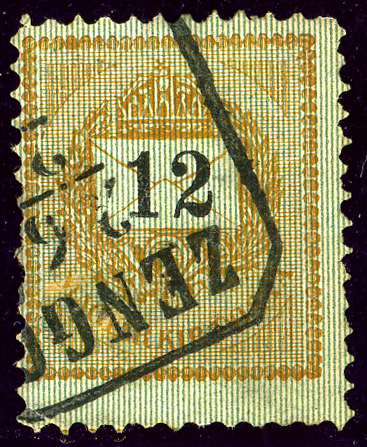
Kingdom of Hungary postage stamp, 1888, cancelled in Senj (Zengg).

Senj has apparently been inhabited since prehistoric times. Senj is an old settlement founded more than 3000 years ago on Kuk hill, which is east of today's Senj. A settlement called Athyinites or Athuinites (Αθυινιτες) in today's Senj was mentioned in Greek documents dated to the 4th century BC. The Illyrian tribes Iapodes and Liburnians inhabited the area as it was located in Illyria.

Senia was a thriving town in the Roman province of Dalmatia, used by the Romans as a stronghold against the Illyrians in the 2nd century BC. The town's importance is attested by Pliny's Natural History, Ptolemy's Geography, and the Tabula Peutingeriana, which identifies it as a port on a major road from Aquileia. The establishment of the colony at Aquileia in 181 BC attracted traders from northern Italy who settled in Senia. In 35 BC, Octavian used Senia as a base for campaigns against the Iapodes, and the city soon attained the legal status of a Roman municipality (municipium).

Senia had a characteristic Roman grid plan. Its main roads, the cardo and decumanus, likely intersected near the location of today's cathedral. This area formed the centre of town, and probably housed the forum, the city's political and religious hub. Archaeological evidence points to multiple religious cults present in the city. They include a shrine to the Great Mother (Magnae Matris), a temple dedicated to Diana. There is also evidence of cults for Liber, Serapis, and Mithras. The city hosted a customs office for Illyricum (publicum portorium Illyrici), which managed the circulation of goods and services. A public bath (balneum) was found near the Štela area.

The city's necropolises were located outside the walls along major roads, as was customary in Roman urban planning. The most significant burial ground was situated between the modern Sv. Ambroz area and Francikovac. It contained both cremation and inhumation graves with tombstones for veterans and local citizens. Another necropolis was discovered in Stolačko Naselje along the road leading to Vratnik; it provides evidence for a small Jewish community in Roman Senia. Their presence is confirmed by the tombstone of Aurelius Dionysius, who, according to the inscription, was originally from Tiberias in the Galilee region of northern Israel. From the 4th to the 6th centuries AD, Senia also had large burial grounds in the areas now occupied by the town's Health Center and Čopićevo Naselje. Notable finds include a glass bottle decorated with a child's head and an inscription by a person named Lucius Gavius Optatus regarding the restoration of a sanctuary for the god Liber. Another large late-antique cemetery was situated near the modern highway and the Šabac fortress, where children were buried within amphorae and adults were placed in pits lined with mortar, gravel, or brick.

Following the legalization of Christianity in the Roman Empire, legalized by the Edict of Milan in 313 AD, a stable Christian community emerged in Senia, establishing a religious center near the ruins of the temple of Magna Mater, where the Cathedral of the Blessed Virgin Mary stands today. One of its bishops, Laurentius, received a papal letter in the early 5th century concerning heresies. Another one, named Maximus, represented the diocese at the Council of Chalcedon in 451 AD.

Senia's status declined in later antiquity. Older accounts claimed that barbarian invasions in the 5th century burned the city to the ground, but recent archaeological excavations have not found layers of soot or destruction to confirm a total conflagration. It is known, however, that the Roman urban grid was largely abandoned or altered during this era, and the city entered a long period of stagnation and poverty.

After the fall of the Roman Empire, the Avars and the Croats eventually settled here in the 7th century AD.

=== Middle Ages ===
The Catholic diocese of Senj was established in 1169. King of Hungary Béla III gave the town to the Knights Templar in 1184, and in 1271 it became the property of the Frankopan counts of Krk.

In 1248 the bishop of Senj was allowed by Pope Innocent IV to use the Glagolitic alphabet and the vernacular in liturgy. A Glagolitic printing press was set up in 1494 and produced the incunabula The Glagolic Missal and Spovid općena.

=== Early Modern period ===
The military captaincy of Senj was established in 1469 in order to defend against the invading Ottoman and Venetian armies. The town sheltered thousands of refugees from nearby occupied areas. The Nehaj Fortress was completed in 1558 on the hill Nehaj, which at the time was outside of town (today it is wholly within the town's borders.) Some of the Senj's towers; names were listed as Radomerić (east); Lipica and Pope Leo's (north); Ladarska, Gatska, and Šabac (west); and Zvancić, and Tulac (south). The wars with the Ottomans lasted well into the 17th century. During this time the Uskoks lived in Senj and occupied its fortress. One of the most significant Uskoks was Ivo Senjanin (Ivo of Senj), who frequently launched expeditions against the Ottomans until his execution in 1612. They served an important purpose during the wars since they had small units of men rowing swift boats that proved to be very effective guerrilla forces. However, after the Uskok War with Venice, which ended in 1617, they were forbidden to settle in the area. Prince Radic was appointed Prince of Senj by King Rudolf, emperor of Austria (1 December 1600). (Radic family) Native noble family from Lika region; members of the family were Uskok military leaders at the headquarters in Senj.

Notable polymath and writer Pavao Ritter Vitezović was born within the city walls in 1652, whose work later inspired the Illyrian movement.

The 18th century brought some prosperity, especially with the construction of the Josephina (named after Emperor Joseph II) linking the Adriatic coast via Senj to Karlovac. The railway line built in 1873 between Fiume (Rijeka) and Karlovac did not pass by Senj which held back further development.

=== Modern history ===
In March 1873, a savings bank opened in Senj.

Apart from a brief period as part of the Illyrian Provinces during the Napoleonic Wars, the town was part of the Croatian Military Frontier (District II, Ottochaner Regiment, right on the border with District III, Oguliner Regiment) within the Habsburg monarchy (from 1804 the Austrian Empire, after the compromise of 1867 Austria-Hungary). When the frontier was dissolved in 1881 it became part of the Kingdom of Croatia-Slavonia (itself within Transleithania and Austria-Hungary) where it was briefly part of the Lika-Otočac District (a transitional merger of Military Frontier districts I and II) before becoming part of Lika-Krbava County in 1886.

In 1929, an HKD Napredak branch was founded in Senj.

In the fall of 1943, during World War II, when Fascist Italy capitulated, the Partisans took control of Senj and used it as a supply port. Subsequently, the Luftwaffe started bombarding the town. By the end of the year they had demolished over half of the buildings in town and inflicted heavy civilian casualties.

== Climate ==
Senj has a temperate climate which is usually described as temperate Oceanic or Marine west coast, with mild, windy winters and relatively dry and warm summers. According to the Köppen (and Trewartha) climate classification it falls within a subtropical zone (Köppen Cfa/Trewartha Cf), with Mediterranean characteristics such as its slightly drier summers.

Since records began in 1949, the highest temperature recorded at the local weather station at an elevation of 26 metres (85 ft) was 39.7 °C (103.5 °F), on 22 July 2015. The coldest temperature was −16.6 °C (2.1 °F), on 10 February 1956.

Climate data for Senj
Month	Jan	Feb	Mar	Apr	May	Jun	Jul	Aug	Sep	Oct	Nov	Dec	Year
Record high °C (°F)	20.5 (68.9)	22.2 (72.0)	25.9 (78.6)	29.5 (85.1)	33.6 (92.5)	36.3 (97.3)	39.7 (103.5)	38.6 (101.5)	35.6 (96.1)	29.9 (85.8)	26.9 (80.4)	20.9 (69.6)	39.7 (103.5)
Daily mean °C (°F)	6.1 (43.0)	6.6 (43.9)	9.5 (49.1)	13.3 (55.9)	17.9 (64.2)	21.9 (71.4)	24.5 (76.1)	24.2 (75.6)	20.2 (68.4)	15.6 (60.1)	11.1 (52.0)	7.5 (45.5)	14.9 (58.8)
Record low °C (°F)	−11.8 (10.8)	−16.6 (2.1)	−9.3 (15.3)	−0.8 (30.6)	3.4 (38.1)	7.6 (45.7)	10.5 (50.9)	8.2 (46.8)	6.7 (44.1)	1.6 (34.9)	−4.9 (23.2)	−10.4 (13.3)	−16.6 (2.1)
Average precipitation mm (inches)	94.2 (3.71)	90.4 (3.56)	86.7 (3.41)	96.1 (3.78)	91.7 (3.61)	84.9 (3.34)	64.5 (2.54)	94.6 (3.72)	137.9 (5.43)	143.4 (5.65)	165.3 (6.51)	124.5 (4.90)	1,274.2 (50.16)
Average rainy days	10	9	10	12	11	10	8	8	9	10	13	12	122
Average snowy days	2	3	2	0	0	0	0	0	0	0	1	2	10
Mean monthly sunshine hours	100.9	123.2	158.1	187.7	242.7	265.8	310.2	287.2	214.7	167.6	101.8	90.2	2,250.1
Source: Croatian Meteorological and Hydrological Service

== Economy ==
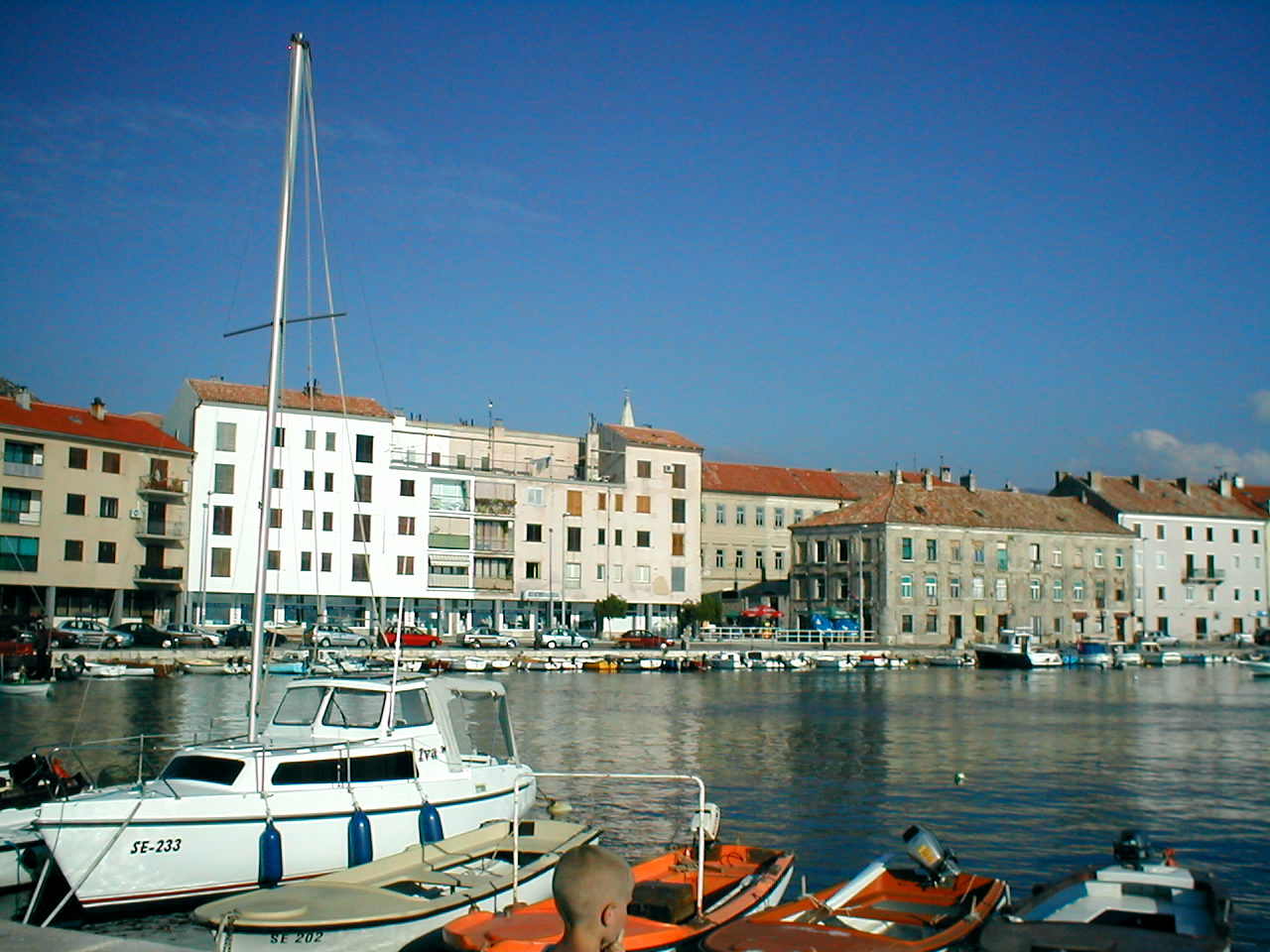
View of the town

Modern Senj is a seaside tourist town. Primary industries are fishing, boating, and tourism.

== Population ==
As of the 2021 census, Senj had a population of 5,973, with 97.30% being ethnic Croats. The largest minorities are Serbs with a population of 43 (0.72%) and Albanians with a population of 27 (0.45%)

Town of Senj: Population trends 1857–2021
v

population	13268	15295	14782	14852	15857	16713	14963	14572	13289	12953	12235	10399	9582	9205	8132	7182	5973
	1857	1869	1880	1890	1900	1910	1921	1931	1948	1953	1961	1971	1981	1991	2001	2011	2021

Sources: Croatian Bureau of Statistics publications

There are 27 settlements in the Town of Senj and they include (population as of 2021):

- Alan, population 11 ▼
- Biljevine, population 42 ▼
- Bunica, population 66 ▼
- Crni Kal, population 61 ▼
- Jablanac, population 53 ▼
- Klada, population 35 ▼
- Krasno, population 385 ▼
- Krivi Put, population 39 ▲
- Lukovo, population 26 ▼
- Melnice, population 41 ▼
- Mrzli Dol, population 23 ▼
- Pijavica, population 23 ▼
- Podbilo, population 20 ▼
- Prizna, population 27 ▼
- Senj, population 4164 ▼
- Senjska Draga, population 78 ▼
- Starigrad, population 21 ▲
- Stinica, population 61 ▼
- Stolac, population 43 ▲
- Sveta Jelena, population 22 ▲
- Sveti Juraj, population 542 ▼
- Velike Brisnice, population 0
- Veljun Primorski, population 57 ▼
- Volarice, population 66 ▼
- Vrataruša, population 5 ▼
- Vratnik, population 56 ▼
- Vrzići, population 6 ▼

== Sports ==
The local HPS chapter was called HPD "Senjsko Bilo".

== Notable people ==
- Blaž Baromić (c. 1450 – 1505)
- Nikola Jurišić (1490 – 1545)
- Ivo Senjanin (c. 1571 – 1612)
- Pavao Ritter Vitezović (1652 – 1713)
- Ivan Paskvić (1754 – 1829)
- Vjenceslav Novak (1859 – 1905)
- Silvije Strahimir Kranjčević (1865 – 1908)
- Milan Ogrizović (1877 – 1923)
- Eugen Kvaternik (1825 – 1871)
- Milan Moguš
- Vladimir Ćopić
- Sandra Šarić
- Edi Karić
- Domagoj Krajina
- Milan Ćopić

== Twin towns – sister cities ==
Senj is twinned with:

- Kőszeg, Hungary
- Parndorf, Austria
- Senec, Slovakia
- Sorbiers, France
- Vratimov, Czech Republic

== Gallery ==
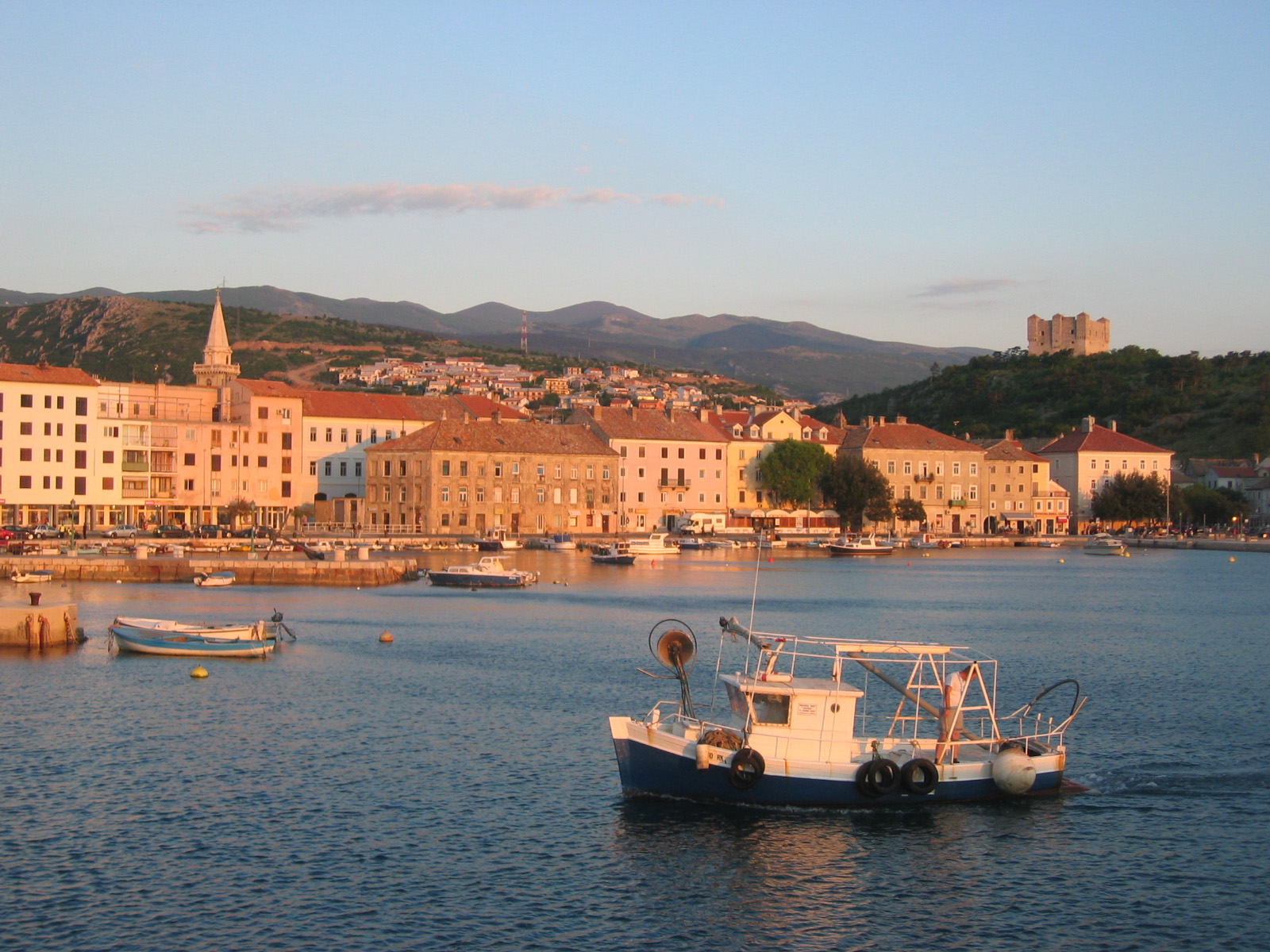
Senj waterfront

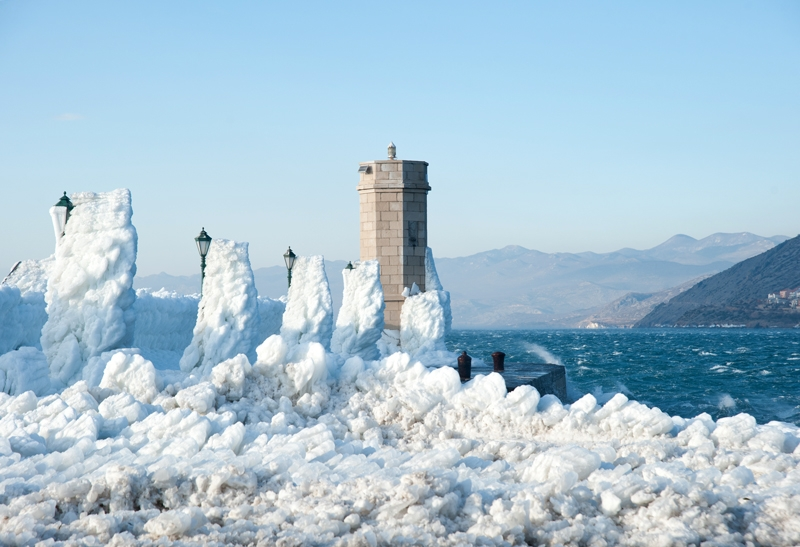
Senj harbor chained with snow after a cold front

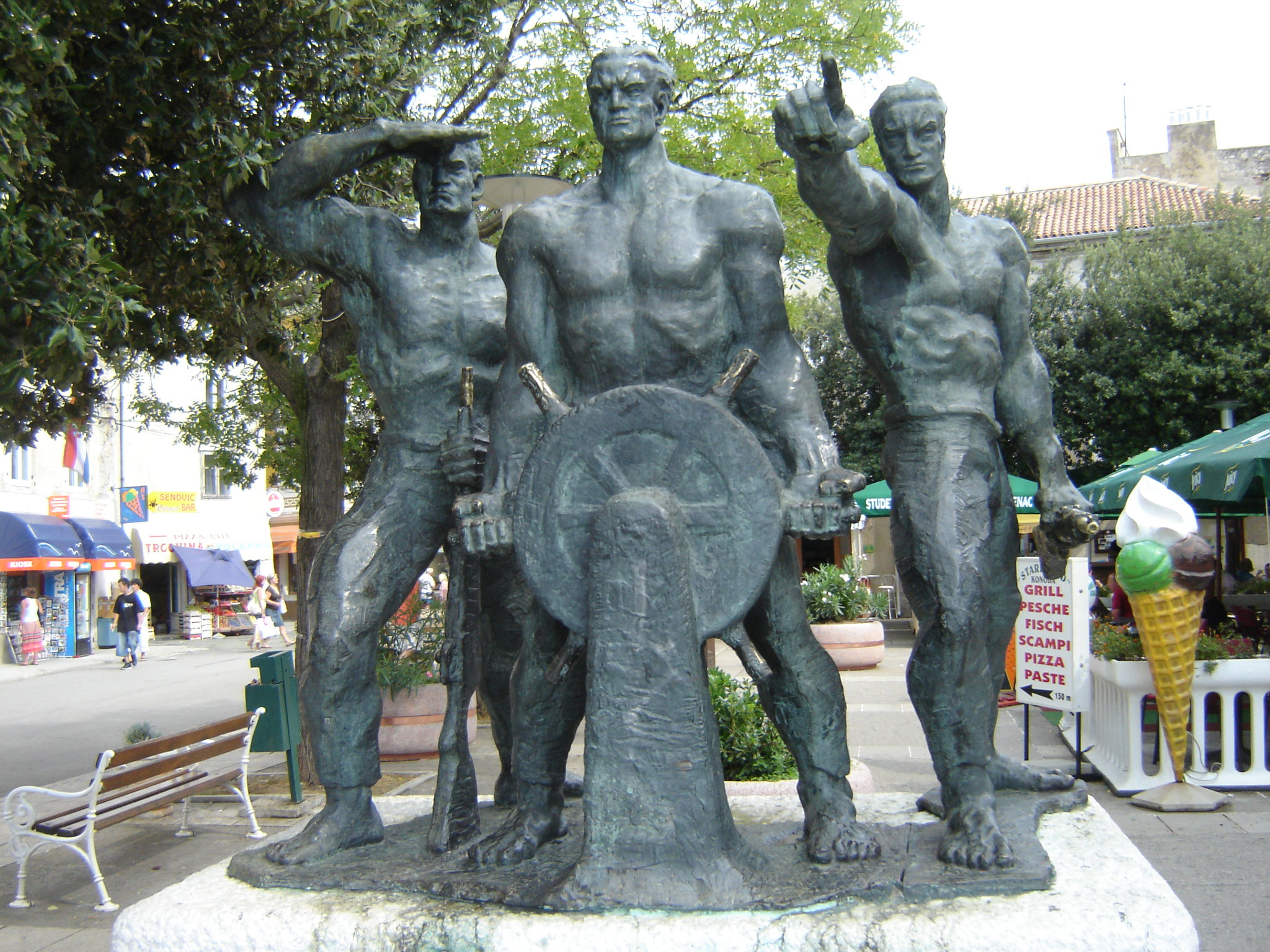
The Three Seamen statue

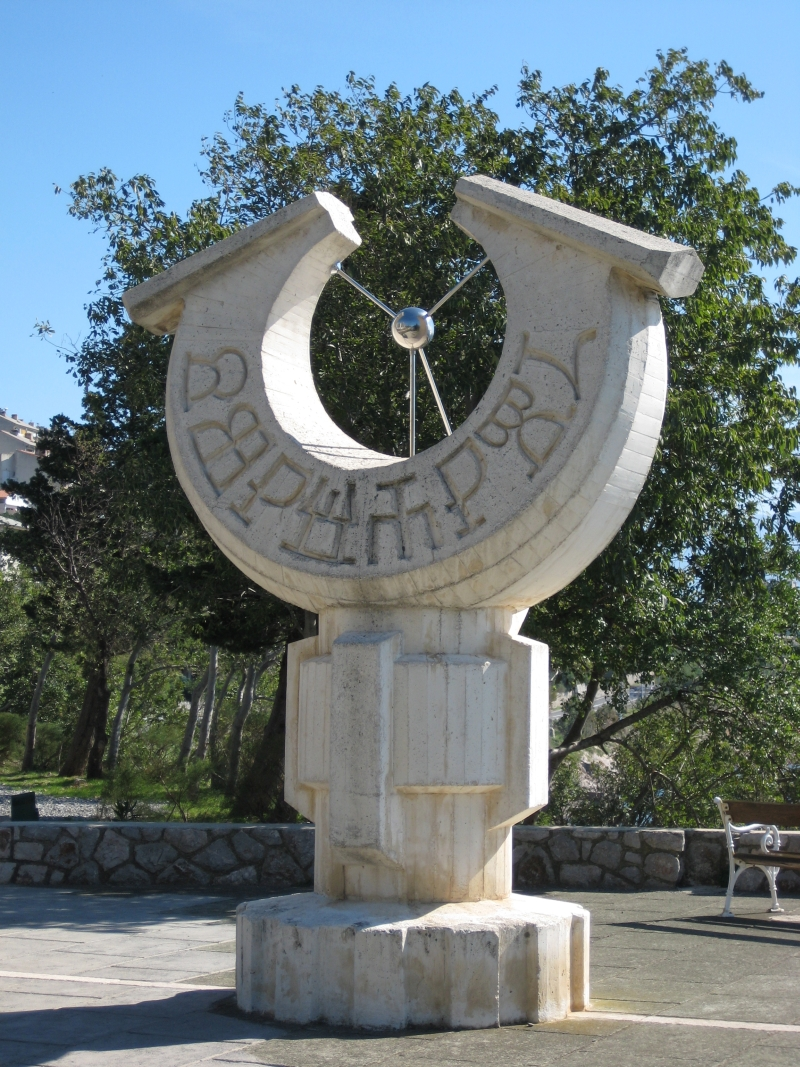
The Sundial in the town that lies on the north 45th parallel

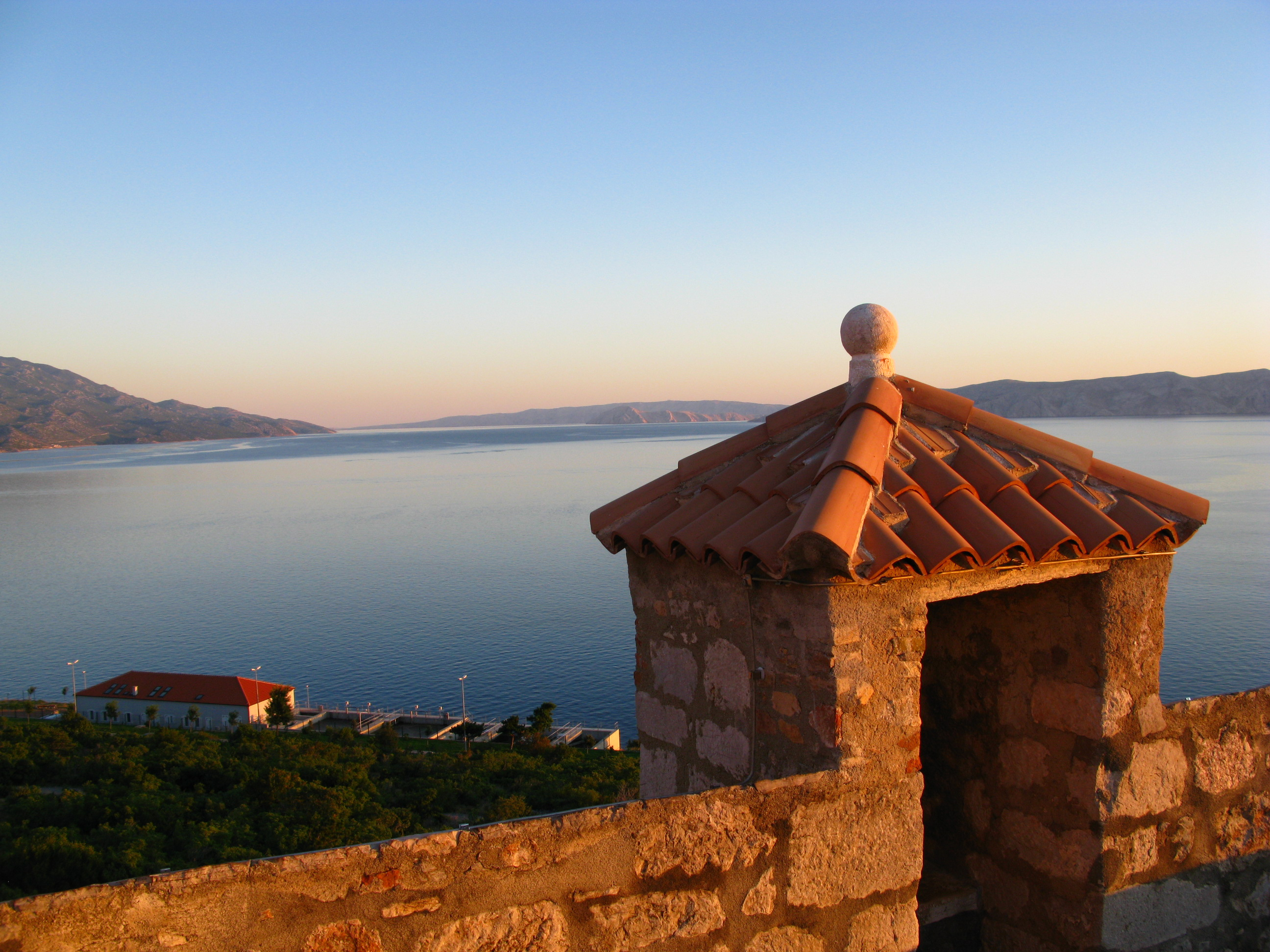
View of the Adriatic Sea

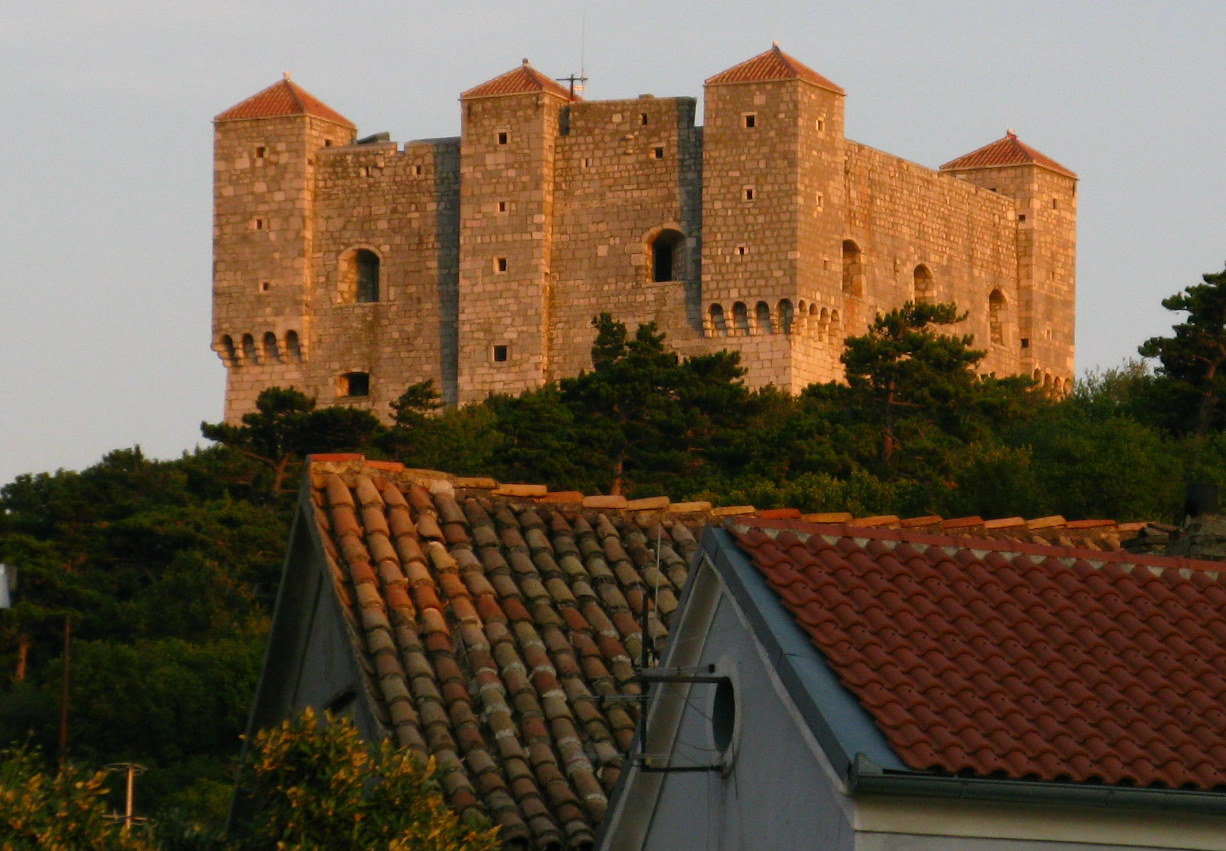
The fortress Nehaj is the most famous monument and symbol of Senj

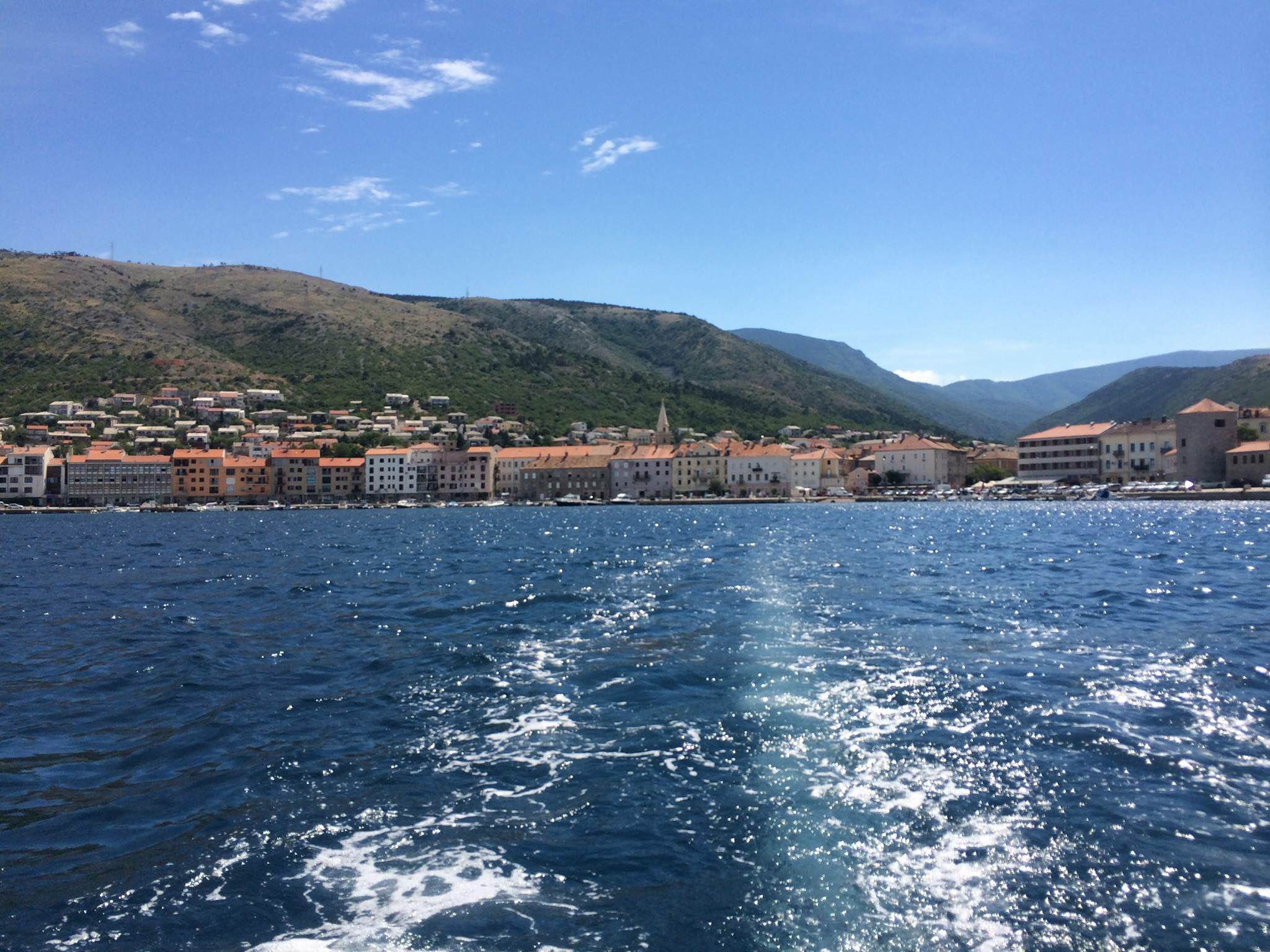
A view of Senj from the sea.

== Bibliography ==
=== General ===
- Leksikografski zavod Miroslav Krleža (2013–2024). "Senj". Hrvatska enciklopedija (online ed.). Archived from the original on December 26, 2023.

=== Biology ===
- Šašić, Martina; Nahirnić, Ana; Tarmann, Gerhard M. (December 31, 2016). "Zygaenidae (Lepidoptera) in the Lepidoptera collections of the Croatian Natural History Museum". Natura Croatica: Periodicum Musei Historiae Naturalis Croatici. 25 (2): 233–248. doi:10.20302/NC.2016.25.19. eISSN 1848-7386.

=== History ===
- Bracewell, Catherine Wendy (1992). The Uskoks of Senj: Piracy, Banditry, and Holy War in the Sixteenth-Century Adriatic. Cornell University Press. ISBN 978-0-801-42674-2.
- Matić, Zdravko (December 22, 2004). "Osnivanje i rad "Napretkovih" organizacija na području Hrvatskog primorja i Gorskog kotara (1928. - 1950.)" [The Foundation and Work of "Napredak" Organisations on the Territory of Hrvatsko Primorje and Gorski Kotar]. Časopis za suvremenu povijest (in Croatian). 36 (3): 1183–1204. ISSN 1848-9079.
