= Starigrad, Lika-Senj County =

Coordinates: 44°47′48″N 14°52′55″E

Starigrad
- Village
- Interactive map of Starigrad
- Country: Croatia
- County: Lika-Senj County
- Municipality: Senj

Area
  - Total: 15.7 km^{2} (6.1 sq mi)

Population (2021)
  - Total: 21
  - Density: 1.3/km^{2} (3.5/sq mi)
- Time zone: UTC+1 (CET)
  - Summer (DST): UTC+2 (CEST)

Starigrad is a small village near Senj, Croatia. It is connected by the D8 highway.
