= Alan, Croatia =

Settlement in Lika-Senj County, Croatia

Alan
- settlement
- Interactive map of Alan
- Location within Croatia
- Coordinates: 45°04′25″N 14°55′53″E
- Country: Croatia
- County: Lika-Senj
- City: Senj

Area
  - Total: 4.0 km^{2} (1.5 sq mi)

Population (2021)
  - Total: 11
  - Density: 2.8/km^{2} (7.1/sq mi)
- Time zone: UTC+1 (CET)
  - Summer (DST): UTC+2 (CEST)
- Postal code: 53270 Senj
- Area code: +385 (0)53

Alan is a settlement in the City of Senj in Croatia. In 2021, its population was 11.

== Demographics ==
Alan: Population trends 1857–2021
v

population	112		445	477	396	451	391	370	282	321	260	91	9	11	11	17	11
	1857	1869	1880	1890	1900	1910	1921	1931	1948	1953	1961	1971	1981	1991	2001	2011	2021

Sources: Croatian Bureau of Statistics publications
