= Senjska Draga =

Settlement in Lika-Senj County, Croatia

- Settlement
- Interactive map of Senjska Draga
- Location of Senjska Draga in Croatia
- Coordinates: 44°58′24″N 14°58′07″E
- Country: Croatia
- County: Lika-Senj
- City: Senj

Area
  - Total: 7.0 km^{2} (2.7 sq mi)

Population (2021)
  - Total: 78
  - Density: 11/km^{2} (29/sq mi)
- Time zone: UTC+1 (CET)
  - Summer (DST): UTC+2 (CEST)
- Postal code: 53270 Senj
- Area code: +385 (0)53

Senjska Draga is a settlement in the City of Senj in Croatia. In 2021, its population was 78.

== Demographics ==
Senjska Draga: Population trends 1857–2021
v

population	152	181	212	231	260	202	214	198	202	182	149	120	128	118	100	85	78
	1857	1869	1880	1890	1900	1910	1921	1931	1948	1953	1961	1971	1981	1991	2001	2011	2021

Sources: Croatian Bureau of Statistics publications
