= Melnice =

Settlement in Lika-Senj County, Croatia

- Settlement
- Interactive map of Melnice
- Location of Melnice in Croatia
- Coordinates: 44°57′57″N 15°01′03″E
- Country: Croatia
- County: Lika-Senj
- City: Senj

Area
  - Total: 15.7 km^{2} (6.1 sq mi)

Population (2021)
  - Total: 41
  - Density: 2.6/km^{2} (6.8/sq mi)
- Time zone: UTC+1 (CET)
  - Summer (DST): UTC+2 (CEST)
- Postal code: 53260 Brinje
- Area code: +385 (0)53

Melnice is a settlement in the City of Senj in Croatia. In 2021, its population was 41.

== Demographics ==
Melnice: Population trends 1857–2021
v

population	357	830	975	293	376	429	355	417	349	320	317	241	172	129	79	57	41
	1857	1869	1880	1890	1900	1910	1921	1931	1948	1953	1961	1971	1981	1991	2001	2011	2021

Sources: Croatian Bureau of Statistics publications
