= Lukovo, Lika-Senj County =

Settlement in Lika-Senj County, Croatia

Lukovo
- Settlement
- Interactive map of Lukovo
- Location of Lukovo in Croatia
- Coordinates: 44°51′22″N 14°53′36″E
- Country: Croatia
- County: Lika-Senj
- City: Senj

Area
  - Total: 24.0 km^{2} (9.3 sq mi)

Population (2021)
  - Total: 26
  - Density: 1.1/km^{2} (2.8/sq mi)
- Time zone: UTC+1 (CET)
  - Summer (DST): UTC+2 (CEST)
- Postal code: 53270 Senj
- Area code: +385 (0)53

Lukovo is a settlement in the City of Senj in Croatia. In 2021, its population was 26.

== Demographics ==
Lukovo: Population trends 1857–2021
v

population	590	632	586	568	562	448	383	433	422	445	336	153	90	57	36	36	26
	1857	1869	1880	1890	1900	1910	1921	1931	1948	1953	1961	1971	1981	1991	2001	2011	2021

Sources: Croatian Bureau of Statistics publications
