= Vjenceslav Novak =

Croatian writer

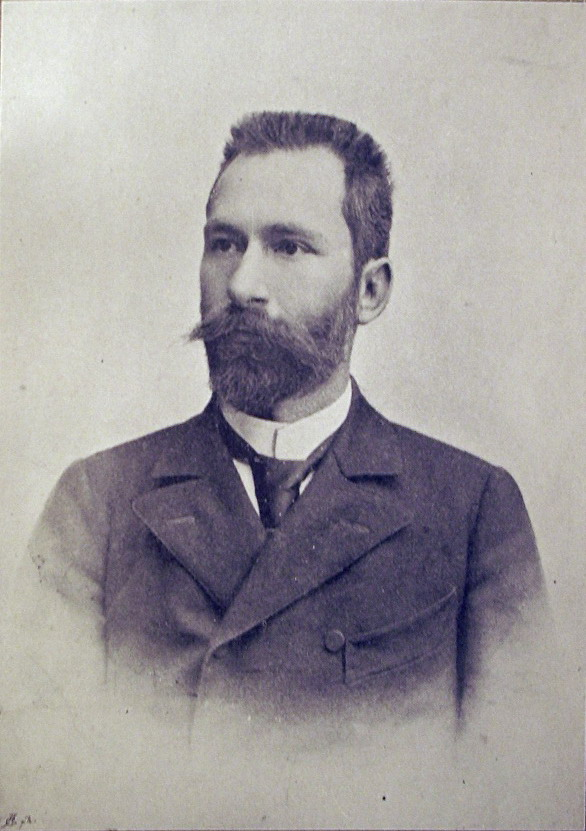
- Born: 11 September 1859; Senj, Kingdom of Croatia, Austria-Hungary (now Senj, Croatia)
- Died: 20 September 1905 (aged 46); Zagreb, Kingdom of Croatia-Slavonia, Austrian Empire (now Zagreb, Croatia)
- Occupations: playwright, poet

Vjenceslav Novak (11 September 1859 – 20 September 1905) was a Croatian Realist writer, dramatist, and music historian.

== Biography ==
Vjenceslav Novak grew up in Senj, where he graduated from elementary school and first two grades of gymnasium, from which he would graduate in Gospić. His father was of Czech origin. He moved to Senj before Vjenceslav was born to work as a merchant. He wanted this son to follow his footsteps, but business was of little interest to Vjenceslav.

Vjenceslav moved to Zagreb after graduating where he studied education in order to become a teacher. After finishing his studies, he moved back to Senj where he would spend the next two years working as a teacher. He later moved to Prague to study music, graduating in 1897. He returned to Zagreb that same year, where he taught musicology. Soon afterwards, he got a position as the main teacher at a gymnasium in Senj. Around this time, he experienced first symptoms of tuberculosis.

His literary career began in 1881. with a short story titled Maca ("The Cat"). He wrote about many subjects, including: musical symposia, dramas, critiques, poems, short stories and novels. In 1888, he published a Croatian musicology textbook.

Vjenceslav died on 20 September 1905 while preparing his manuscript for printing.

== Literary style ==
There are certain tropes inhibiting all of Vjenceslav's works. In his novels, he frequently portrays the existence and struggle of a working class who find themselves in all sorts of struggles. His prose was written during the realism literary movement in Croatia, depicting the people and society as it was in his time.

== Works ==
- Novels:
  - Pavao Šegota
  - Pod Nehajem
  - Posljednji Stipančići (Matica hrvatska, 1899, Agram)
  - Dva svijeta
  - Tito Dorčić
  - Nikola Baretić
