= Kladas =

Kladas may refer to:

- John Kladas, Greek composer
- Krokodeilos Kladas, Greek military leader
- Nikolaos Kladas, Greek officer and general
- Kladas, Greece, a village near Sparta

== See also ==
- Klada (disambiguation)
