= Vrzići =

Settlement in Lika-Senj County, Croatia

- Settlement
- Interactive map of Vrzići
- Location of Vrzići in Croatia
- Coordinates: 44°55′46″N 15°03′16″E
- Country: Croatia
- County: Lika-Senj
- City: Senj

Area
  - Total: 8.6 km^{2} (3.3 sq mi)

Population (2021)
  - Total: 6
  - Density: 0.70/km^{2} (1.8/sq mi)
- Time zone: UTC+1 (CET)
  - Summer (DST): UTC+2 (CEST)
- Postal code: 53260 Brinje
- Area code: +385 (0)53

Vrzići is a settlement in the City of Senj in Croatia. In 2021, its population was 6.

== Demographics ==
Vrzići: Population trends 1857–2021
v

population				144	166	191	187	176	123	137	100	74	54	39	8	8	6
	1857	1869	1880	1890	1900	1910	1921	1931	1948	1953	1961	1971	1981	1991	2001	2011	2021

Sources: Croatian Bureau of Statistics publications
