= Velike Brisnice =

Settlement in Lika-Senj County, Croatia

- Settlement
- Interactive map of Velike Brisnice
- Location of Velike Brisnice in Croatia
- Coordinates: 44°46′49″N 14°55′30″E
- Country: Croatia
- County: Lika-Senj
- City: Senj

Area
  - Total: 18.8 km^{2} (7.3 sq mi)

Population (2021)
  - Total: 0
  - Density: 0.0/km^{2} (0.0/sq mi)
- Time zone: UTC+1 (CET)
  - Summer (DST): UTC+2 (CEST)
- Postal code: 53270 Senj
- Area code: +385 (0)53

Velike Brisnice is a settlement in the City of Senj in Croatia. In 2021, its population was 0.

== Demographics ==
Velike Brisnice: Population trends 1857–2021
v

population	280			229	161	219	181	168	155	143	77	23	4	1	1
	1857	1869	1880	1890	1900	1910	1921	1931	1948	1953	1961	1971	1981	1991	2001	2011	2021

Sources: Croatian Bureau of Statistics publications
