= Veljun Primorski =

Settlement in Lika-Senj County, Croatia

- Settlement
- Interactive map of Veljun Primorski
- Location of Veljun Primorski in Croatia
- Coordinates: 44°59′45″N 14°57′10″E
- Country: Croatia
- County: Lika-Senj
- City: Senj

Area
  - Total: 21.7 km^{2} (8.4 sq mi)

Population (2021)
  - Total: 57
  - Density: 2.6/km^{2} (6.8/sq mi)
- Time zone: UTC+1 (CET)
  - Summer (DST): UTC+2 (CEST)
- Postal code: 53270 Senj
- Area code: +385 (0)53

Veljun Primorski is a settlement in the City of Senj in Croatia. In 2021, its population was 57.

== History ==
On 26 March 2022 at 13:21 the JVP Grada Senja received a call about a wildfire in the area. 6 hectares (15 acres) burned by the time it was put out at 15:36.

== Demographics ==
Veljun Primorski: Population trends 1857–2021
v

population	300			494	509	573	625	611	599	480	403	307	217	112	91	70	57
	1857	1869	1880	1890	1900	1910	1921	1931	1948	1953	1961	1971	1981	1991	2001	2011	2021

Sources: Croatian Bureau of Statistics publications
