= Vratnik, Lika-Senj County =

Settlement in Lika-Senj County, Croatia

Vratnik
- Settlement
- Interactive map of Vratnik
- Location of Vratnik in Croatia
- Coordinates: 44°58′40″N 15°00′23″E
- Country: Croatia
- County: Lika-Senj
- City: Senj

Area
  - Total: 6.0 km^{2} (2.3 sq mi)

Population (2021)
  - Total: 56
  - Density: 9.3/km^{2} (24/sq mi)
- Time zone: UTC+1 (CET)
  - Summer (DST): UTC+2 (CEST)
- Postal code: 53260 Brinje
- Area code: +385 (0)53

Vratnik is a settlement in the City of Senj in Croatia. In 2021, its population was 56.

== Demographics ==
Vratnik: Population trends 1857–2021
v

population	361			411	289	354	306	230	298	261	191	173	155	100	75	59	56
	1857	1869	1880	1890	1900	1910	1921	1931	1948	1953	1961	1971	1981	1991	2001	2011	2021

Sources: Croatian Bureau of Statistics publications
