= Bunica, Croatia =

Bunica
- Village
- Interactive map of Bunica
- Location within Croatia
- Coordinates: 45.025861°N 14.888082°E
- Country: Croatia
- County: Lika-Senj County
- Municipality: Senj

Population (2021)
  - Total: 66

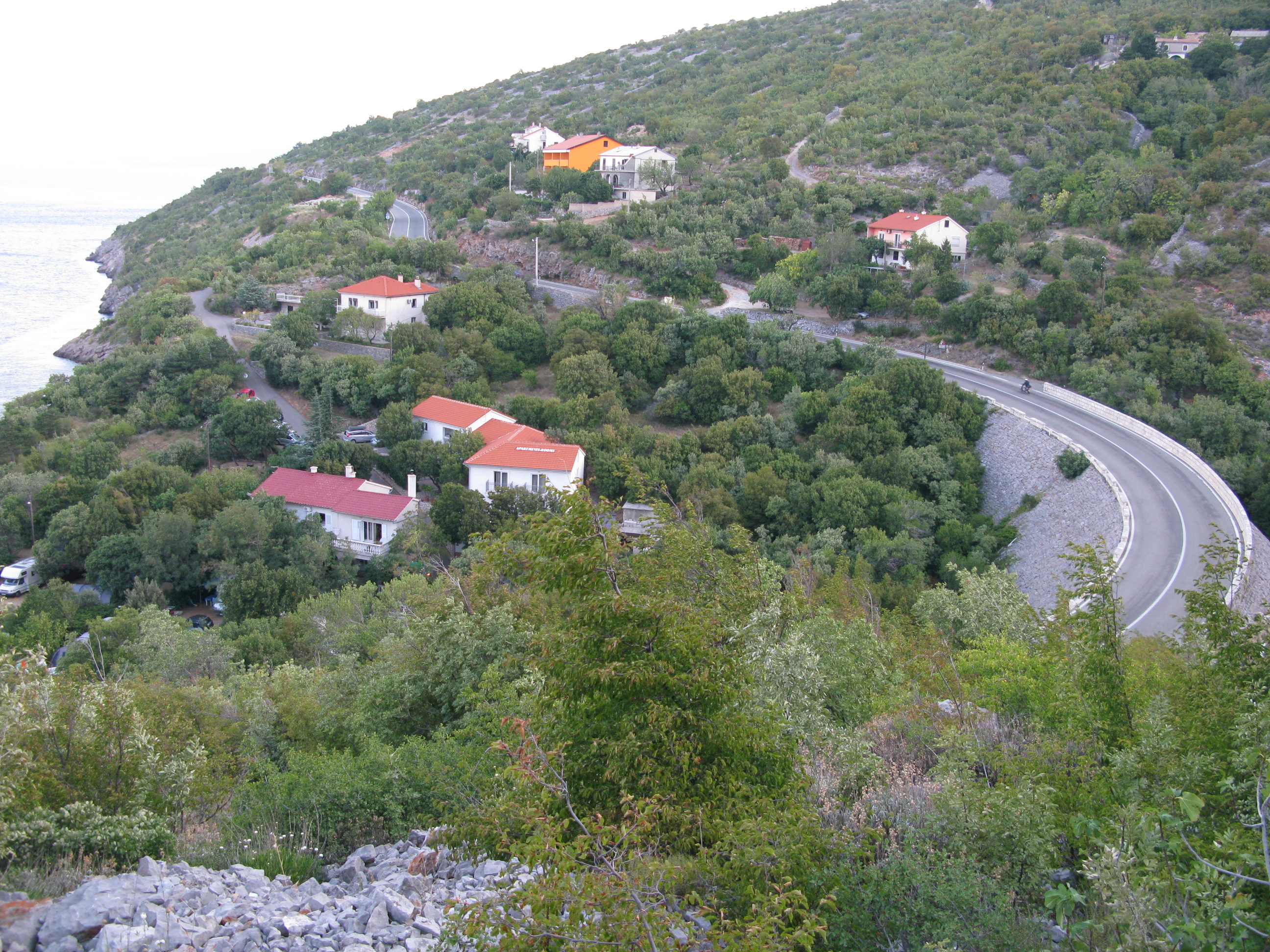
Bunica

Bunica is a tourist resort located in a cove just northwest of the town of Senj, Croatia.

It was not registered as a standalone settlement by census 2001, but was registered with a population of 85 in the 2011 census.

It is located by the D8 highway.
