= Sveta Jelena, Lika-Senj County =

Settlement in Lika-Senj County, Croatia

Sveta Jelena
- Settlement
- Interactive map of Sveta Jelena
- Location of Sveta Jelena in Croatia
- Coordinates: 45°00′53″N 14°53′30″E
- Country: Croatia
- County: Lika-Senj
- City: Senj

Area
  - Total: 0.8 km^{2} (0.31 sq mi)

Population (2021)
  - Total: 22
  - Density: 28/km^{2} (71/sq mi)
- Time zone: UTC+1 (CET)
  - Summer (DST): UTC+2 (CEST)
- Postal code: 53270 Senj
- Area code: +385 (0)53

Sveta Jelena is a settlement in the City of Senj in Croatia. In 2021, its population was 22.
