= Stolac, Croatia =

Settlement in Lika-Senj County, Croatia

Stolac
- Settlement
- Interactive map of Stolac
- Location of Stolac in Croatia
- Coordinates: 44°56′28″N 14°58′59″E
- Country: Croatia
- County: Lika-Senj
- City: Senj

Area
  - Total: 22.3 km^{2} (8.6 sq mi)

Population (2021)
  - Total: 43
  - Density: 1.9/km^{2} (5.0/sq mi)
- Time zone: UTC+1 (CET)
  - Summer (DST): UTC+2 (CEST)
- Postal code: 53270 Senj
- Area code: +385 (0)53

Stolac is a settlement in the City of Senj in Croatia. In 2021, its population was 43.

== Demographics ==
Stolac: Population trends 1857–2021
v

population	266	535	467	367	321	342	394	416	430	359	349	267	177	87	55	41	43
	1857	1869	1880	1890	1900	1910	1921	1931	1948	1953	1961	1971	1981	1991	2001	2011	2021

Sources: Croatian Bureau of Statistics publications
