= Klada, Croatia =

Settlement in Lika-Senj County, Croatia

Klada
- Settlement
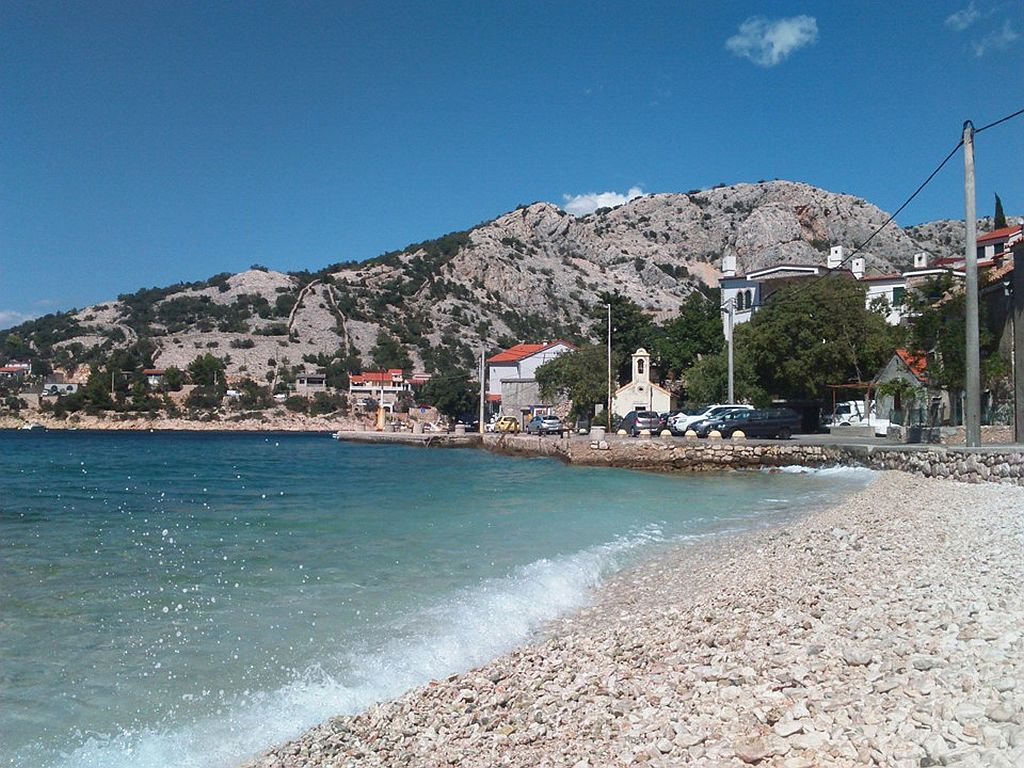
- Beach in Klada
- Interactive map of Klada
- Location of Klada in Croatia
- Coordinates: 44°48′49″N 14°54′23″E
- Country: Croatia
- County: Lika-Senj
- City: Senj

Area
  - Total: 21.5 km^{2} (8.3 sq mi)

Population (2021)
  - Total: 35
  - Density: 1.6/km^{2} (4.2/sq mi)
- Time zone: UTC+1 (CET)
  - Summer (DST): UTC+2 (CEST)
- Postal code: 53270 Senj
- Area code: +385 (0)53

Klada is a settlement in the City of Senj in Croatia. In 2021, its population was 35.

== Demographics ==
Klada: Population trends 1857–2021
v

population	418	527	473	453	500	477	419	381	307	200	141	79	44	49	33	39	35
	1857	1869	1880	1890	1900	1910	1921	1931	1948	1953	1961	1971	1981	1991	2001	2011	2021

Sources: Croatian Bureau of Statistics publications
