= Crni Kal, Croatia =

Settlement in Lika-Senj County, Croatia

Crni Kal
- Settlement
- Interactive map of Crni Kal
- Location of Crni Kal in Croatia
- Coordinates: 44°55′08″N 15°03′58″E
- Country: Croatia
- County: Lika-Senj
- City: Senj

Area
  - Total: 21.5 km^{2} (8.3 sq mi)

Population (2021)
  - Total: 61
  - Density: 2.8/km^{2} (7.3/sq mi)
- Time zone: UTC+1 (CET)
  - Summer (DST): UTC+2 (CEST)
- Postal code: 53260 Brinje
- Area code: +385 (0)53

Crni Kal is a settlement in the City of Senj in Croatia. In 2021, its population was 61.

== Demographics ==
Crni Kal: Population trends 1857–2021
v

population				110	155	137	230	246	185	183	163	133	144	99	75	72	61
	1857	1869	1880	1890	1900	1910	1921	1931	1948	1953	1961	1971	1981	1991	2001	2011	2021

Sources: Croatian Bureau of Statistics publications
